= Tis Castle =

Castle in Sistan and Baluchestan province, Iran

Tis Fortress
- قلعه تیس
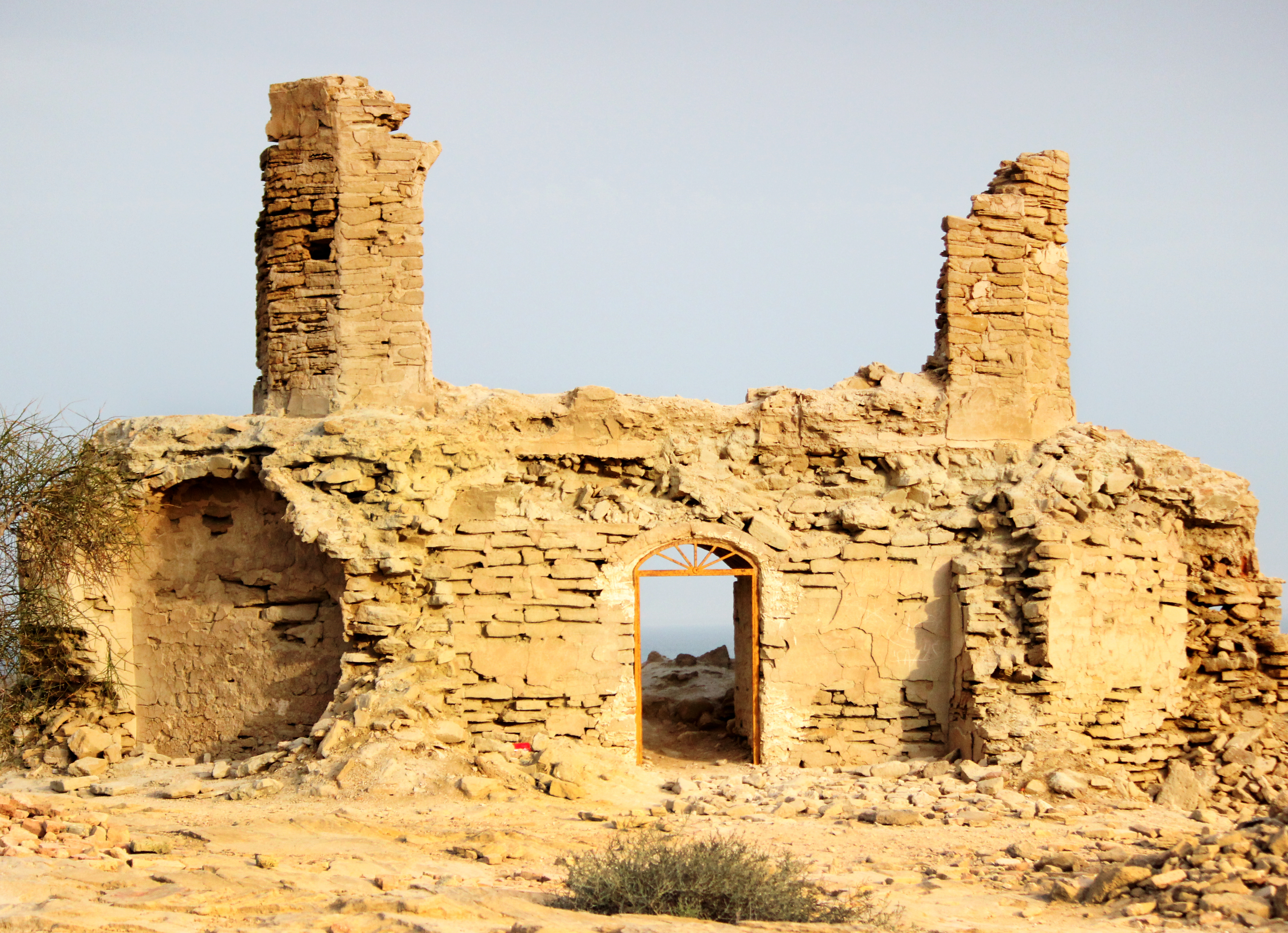

General information
- Type: Castle
- Architectural style: Safavid style

Iran National Heritage List
- Official name: Tis Fortress
- Type: Fortress
- Designated: 1966
- Reference no.: 555
- Conservation organization: Cultural Heritage, Handicrafts and Tourism Organization of Iran
- Location: Chabahar County, Sistan and Baluchestan province, Iran
- Coordinates: 25.3543°N 60.6070°E

Tis Fortress (Persian: قلعه تیس) is a Safavid era historic castle located in Chabahar County, Sistan and Baluchestan province, Iran.
