= Ahmad Sultan Afshar =

Qizilbash officer from the Afshar tribe

Ahmad Sultan Afshar was a Qizilbash officer from the Afshar tribe, who served as the governor of several provinces and districts in Khorasan.

He is first mentioned as serving the governor of Herat, Amir Khan Mawsillu, and later in 1516 fought against the Timurid prince Muhammad Zaman Mirza, who had captured Balkh. In 1520/1, Ahmad Sultan was appointed as the governor of Tus and Mashhad, but was after some time replaced by Burun Sultan.

In 1522, the new governor of Herat, Durmish Khan Shamlu, appointed Ahmad Sultan as the governor of several districts. Ahmad Sultan later took part in the battle of Jam in 1528, in which the Safavids defeated the Uzbeks. Ahmad Sultan thereafter disappears from sources, his fate remaining unknown.

== Sources ==
- Savory, R. M. (1984). "AḤMAD SOLṬĀN AFŠĀR". Encyclopaedia Iranica, Vol. I, Fasc. 6. p. 661.

Unknown	Governor of Tus; 1520/1	Succeeded by Burun Sultan
Unknown	Governor of Mashhad; 1520/1	Succeeded by Burun Sultan
