= Fakhri Heravi =

Soltan-Mohammad Fakhri Heravi (Persian: فخری هروی; c. 1497–after 1566) was a poet and scholar who served in the courts of the Safavid, Arghunid and Mughal dynasties. A native of Herat, he was the son of the poet Amiri.

Haft keshvar, a historical chronicle following parts of the "mirror for princes" genre, was dedicated to the Safavid Shah Ismail I (r. 1501–1524) by Fakhri Heravi, who acted as a panegyrist for both Ismail I and his successor Shah Tahmasp I (r. 1524–1576). The governor of Herat, Durmish Khan Shamlu and his vizier Karim al-Din Khvajeh Habibollah Savaji supported Fakhri Heravi. In 1524, Fakhri Heravi translated Ali-Shir Nava'i's Chagatai Turkic text, Majalis al-Nafais, into Persian under the title Lata'ef-nama.

Fakhri Heravi later moved to Sindh, then ruled by the Arghunid Mirza Shah Hasan (r. 1524–1555).

== Sources ==
- Qasemi, Sharif Husain (1999). "Faḵrī Heravī, Solṭān-Moḥammad". In Yarshater, Ehsan (ed.). Encyclopædia Iranica (Online ed.). Encyclopædia Iranica Foundation. ISBN 978-0933273351.
