= Safavid art =

Art in Iran during the Safavid dynasty (1501–1722)

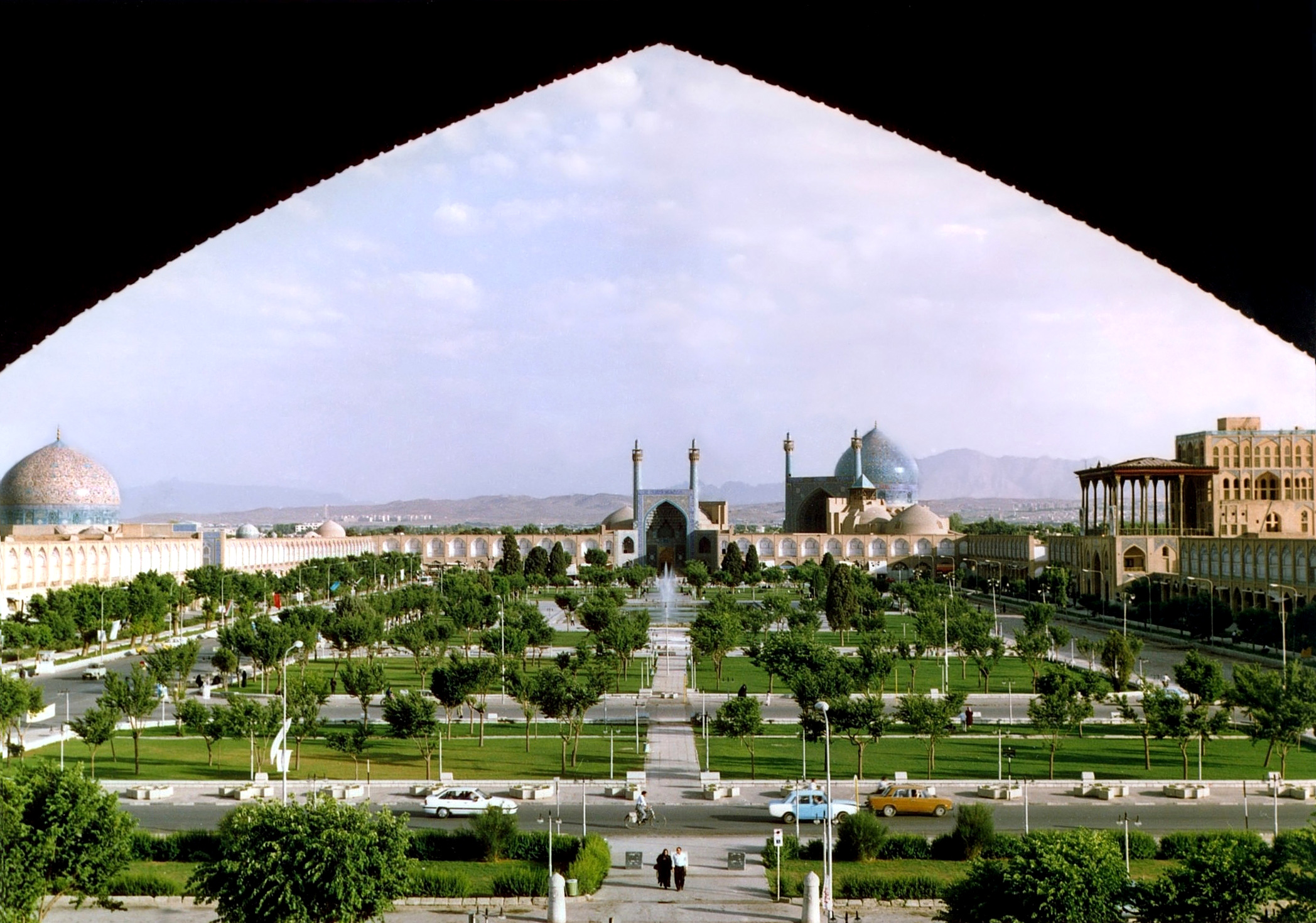
Naqsh-e Jahan Square, Isfahan

Safavid art is the art of the Iranian Safavid dynasty from 1501 to 1722, encompassing Iran and parts of the Caucasus and Central Asia. It was a high point for Persian miniatures, architecture and also included ceramics, metal, glass, and gardens. The arts of the Safavid period show a far more unitary development than in any other period of Iranian art. The Safavid Empire was one of the most significant ruling dynasties of Iran. They ruled one of the greatest Persian empires since the Muslim conquest of Persia, and with this, the empire produced numerous artistic accomplishments.

== Historical context ==
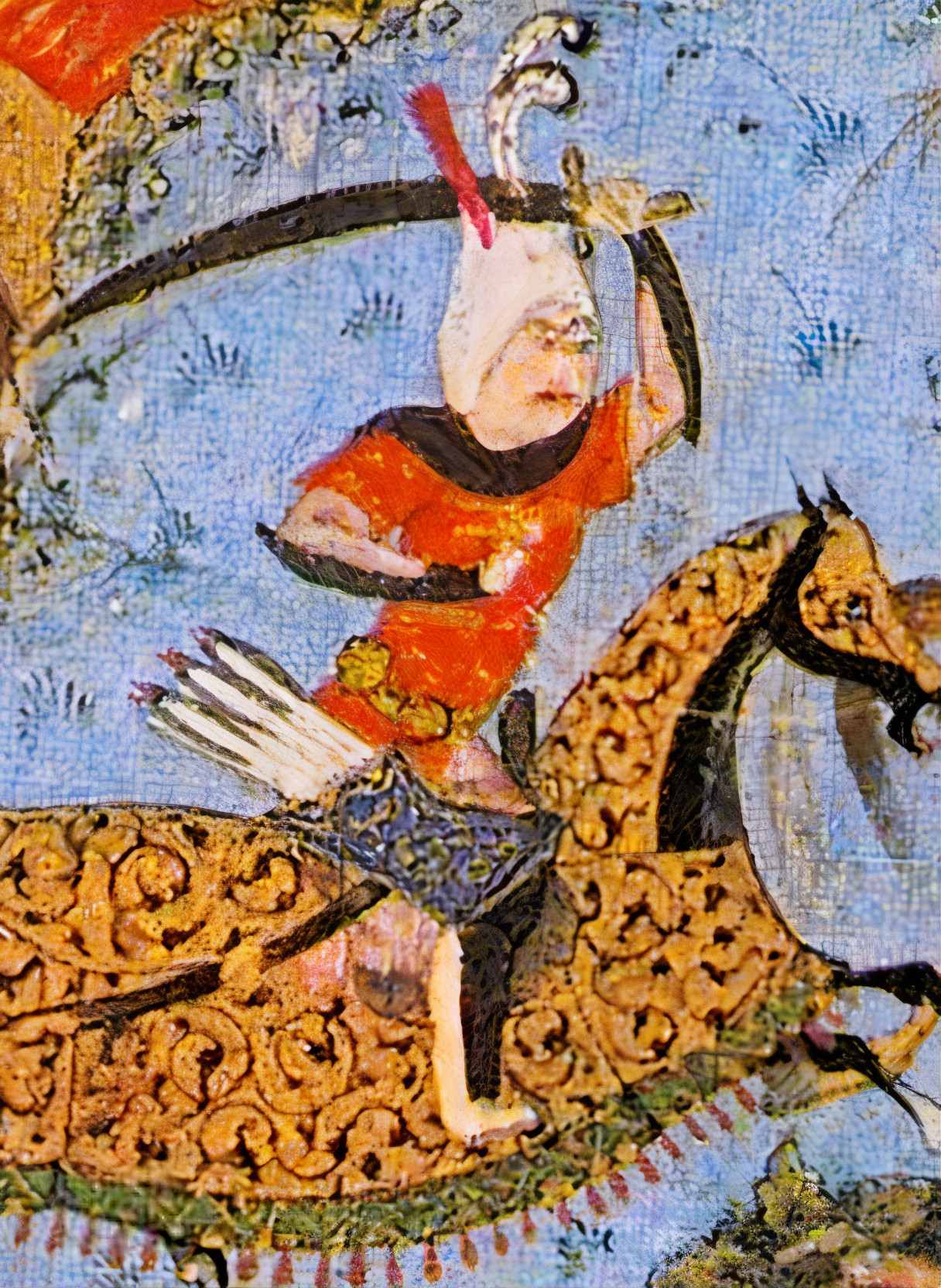
Shāh Ismaʿīl in battle. Folio 107v. Shāhnāmah Shāh Ismaʿīl, 1541, Tabriz (British Library, Add. 7784).

The Safavid dynasty had its roots in a brotherhood called Safaviyeh which appeared in Azerbaijan around 1301, with Sheikh Safi-ad-din Ardabili who gave it his name. The Safavids have greatly contributed to the spread of the Twelvers branch of Shia Islam, those who consider the twelfth imam hidden like his leader.

It was however not until 1447 that the Safavid dynasty began to show its political ambitions, with the seizing of power by Sheikh Djunayd. A system of battles and alliances with the Turkmen tribes began, leading to the extinction of the dynasty of the Kara Koyunlu who reigned up to that time over the region of Tabriz, across from those of the Ak Koyunlu installed in Anatolia. Haydari, the successor of Djunayd, was quickly killed, and Shah Ismail, then 12 years of age, took his place as leader of the movement in 1499. A vigorous propaganda was soon put in place, allowing an army to be recruited. In 1500, his 7000 soldiers defied the Turkmen troops, 30,000 men strong, and in 1501, Shah Ismail entered Tabriz in the north-west of Iran, proclaimed the rite of imamism (Twelvers) to be the religion of state and had the first coins struck in his name.

The territorial expansion accelerated towards Baghdad, deeper into the Caucasus and the Ottoman Empire, but the arrival of Selim I at the head of the Ottoman empire, which forbade the Shia religion, and the battle of Chaldiran (August 22, 1514), marked a stopping point. The Safavid army, unfamiliar with firearms, suffered a painful defeat. Selim I entered Tabriz—from which he withdrew several months later because of internal quarrels—and annexed a large part of the Safavid territory. Shah Ismail, whose divine ascendance had been definitely set aside, withdrew from political life, while relations with the Qizilbash Turkmen deteriorated. The settlement of the Portuguese at the Strait of Hormuz sparked a flourishing commerce with Europe.

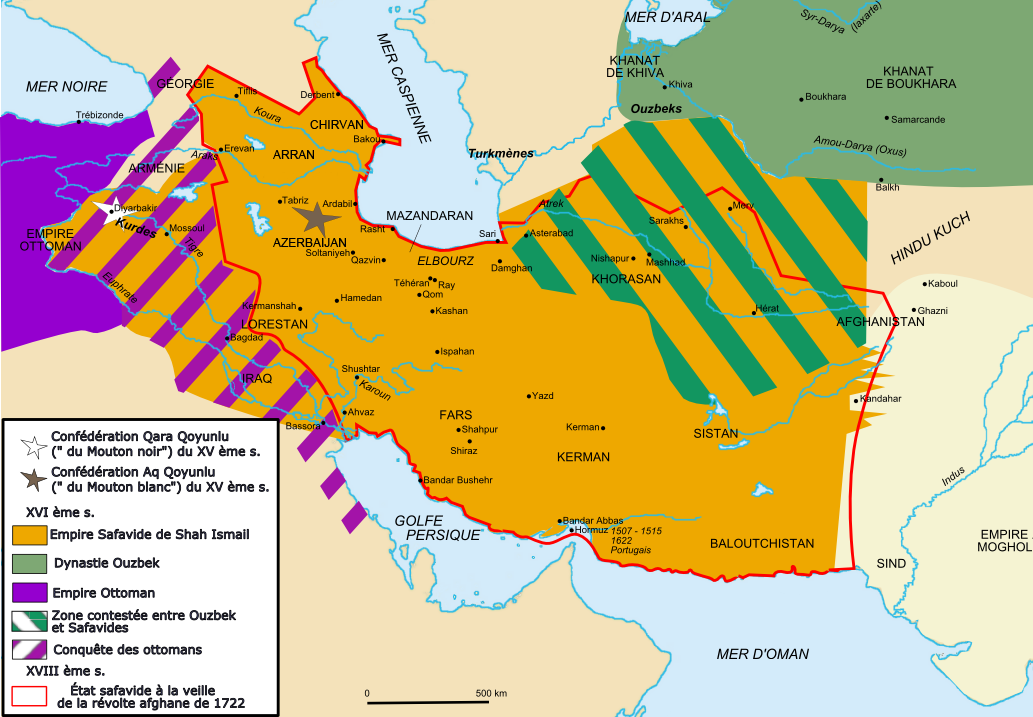
Map of the Safavid empire

After the death of Shah Ismail, his 10-year-old son Shah Tahmasp came into power. In 1534, Suleiman invaded Iran with a force numbering 200,000 men and 300 pieces of artillery. Tahmasp could only field 7,000 men (of dubious loyalty) and a few cannons. The Ottomans seized the Safavid capital Tabriz, and captured Baghdad. Tahmasp avoided direct confrontation with the Ottoman army, preferring to harass it then retreat, leaving scorched earth behind him. This scorched earth policy led to the loss of 30,000 Ottoman troops as they made their way through the Zagros Mountains and Suleiman decided to abandon his campaign.

Twelve years of confusion followed the death of Tahmasp in 1576, and it was not until the arrival of Shah Abbas the Great that calm was restored. He quickly signed an unfavourable peace with the Ottomans, to give himself time to establish an army of ghulams. These fully loyal converted slave soldiers of ethnic Circassian, Georgian and Armenian origin had been deported to Persia en masse since the time of Tahmasp I. Trained with the best training and equipped with the best weapons, these soldiers would replace the Qizilbash from virtually all their positions in the royal household, the civil administration and the army, and be fully loyal to the Shah. These measures, including the heavy European reforms of the army, thanks to the British brothers Shirley, allowed the Shah to easily defeat the Uzbeks and to retake Herat in 1598, then Baghdad in 1624, and the whole Caucasus, and beyond. This reign, the highlight of the dynasty, supported flourishing commerce and art, notably with the construction of the new capital of Isfahan.

The period after the death of Shah Abbas was a long decline, partly due to the harem system, which encouraged intrigue and manipulation, often by the same new Caucasian layers in the Persian society. The reign of Shah Safi (reigned 1629–1642) was notable for its arbitrary violence and territorial retreats; that of Shah Abbas II marked the beginning of religious intolerance towards the Dhimmis and particularly the Jews, a situation which continued under Shah Suleiman and Shah Husayn. Disintegrated by feuds, civil strife, and foreign interference of most notably the Russians, Dutch, and Portuguese, a rebellion of Afghans would be enough in 1709 to lead the dynasty eventually to a fall in 1722.

== Architecture and urbanism ==
=== Under Shah Ismail ===
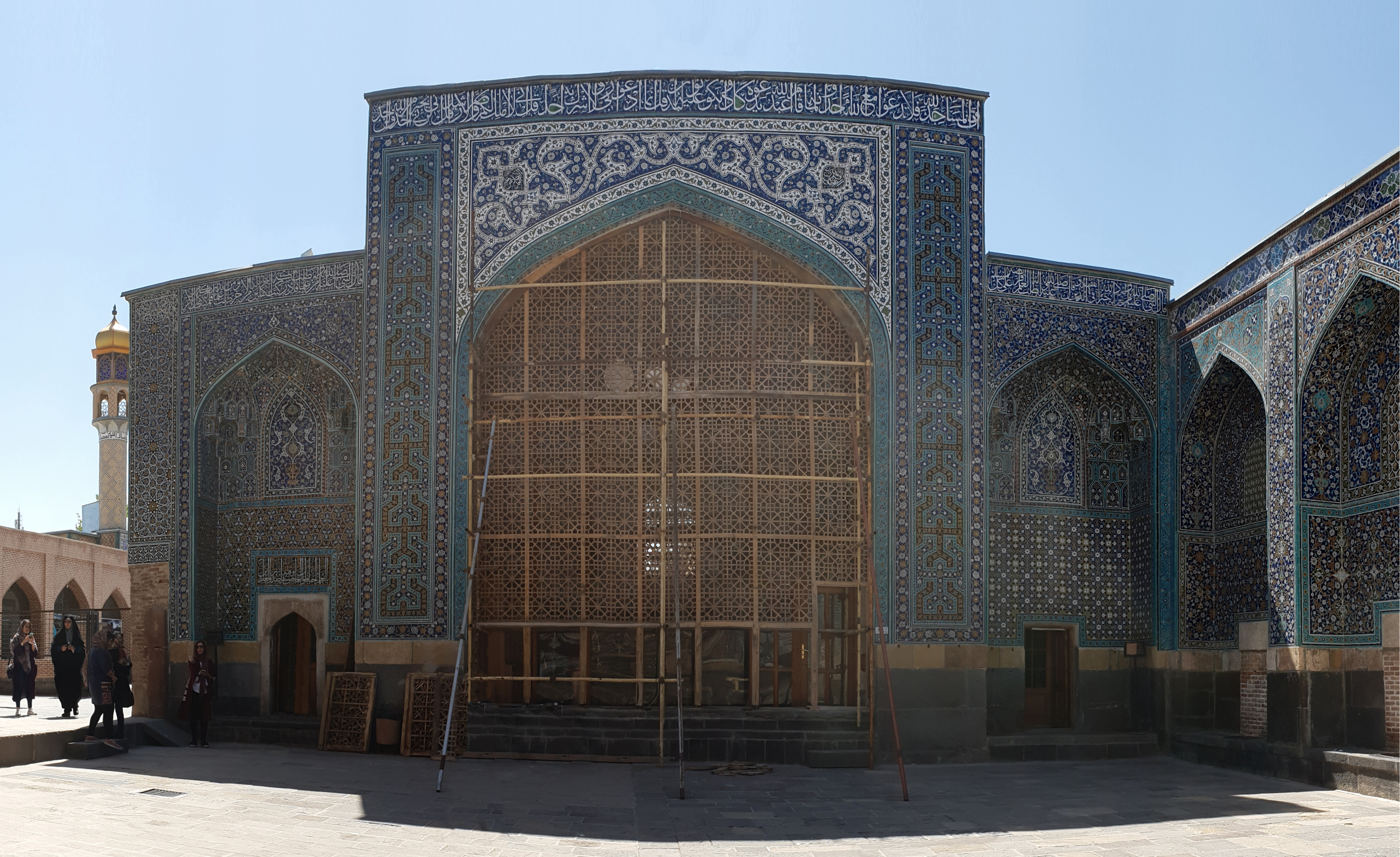
Dar al-Hadith in the Sheikh Safi al-Din Khānegāh and Shrine Ensemble in Ardabil.

While the first Safavid Shah followed a rather intensive policy of restoration and conservation of the great Shiah places, such as Karbala (1508), Najaf (1508) and Samarra in Iraq and Mashhad in the east of Iran, etc., thus perpetuating the Timurid traditions, on the other hand his participation in architectural construction was almost nonexistent, no doubt because the Safavid conquest was carried out without major destruction. Thus, at Tabriz, the new capital, all the surviving Ilkhanid, Jalayirid, Aq Qoyunlu and Timurid monuments largely satisfied the needs of the Shah and his administration. It was nevertheless Ismail who made the city of Ardabil (northern Iran) into a dynastic centre and place of pilgrimage, embellishing the complex surrounding the tomb of Shaykh Safi and interring there the remains of his father in 1509. He is responsible in particular for the construction of Dar al-Hadith, a hall dedicated to the study of the Hadiths, similar to the old Dar al-Huffaz, which served for reciting the Quran. (Note: Researchers are divided about the attribution of Dar al-Hadith to Shah Ismail, but Sussan Babai notes the mention, in 1570, of an inscription with the titles of Shah Ismail on the facade. Babaie 2003, p. 32) It was no doubt also he himself who designed his own tomb, even though it was created shortly after his death. Ismail is also credited with the restoration of the Masjed-e Jameh de Saveh, in 1520, of which the exterior decoration has disappeared, but of which the mihrab combines a use of ancient stucco and a delicate decor of arabesques in ceramic mosaic. Another mosque of Saveh, the Masjed-e meydan, received a similar mihrab, dated by inscriptions to between 1510 and 1518.

Dormish Khan Shamlu, brother-in-law of Ismail, partially compensated for this lack of construction beginning in 1503. This governor of Isfahan, who lived more often at the court of Tabriz than in his city, left the reins to Mirza Shah Hussein Isfahani, the greatest architect of the period, whom he commissioned and funded to build in Isfahan the Mausoleum of Harun-e Vilayat (1512–1513), and the Ali Mosque (1522), the only mosque built in Iran in the first half of the 16th century. Described by a western traveller as a great place of "Persian pilgrimage" (as much for Muslims as for Jews and Christians), the Mausoleum of Harun-e Vilayat is composed of a square chamber under a cupola, a completely traditional design. The cupola rests on a high drum, the muqarnas filling the octagonal passageway. Two minarets, now gone, magnified the great porch, while the decor of hazerbaf and the ceramic mosaic, concentrated on the facade, stayed in the Timurid tradition. The facade, punctuated by blind arches, is thus unified by basic decor, as was already the case at the mosque of Yazd. The nearby mosque masjed-e Ali was completed in 1522 under the order of the same commander.

=== Under Shah Tahmasp ===
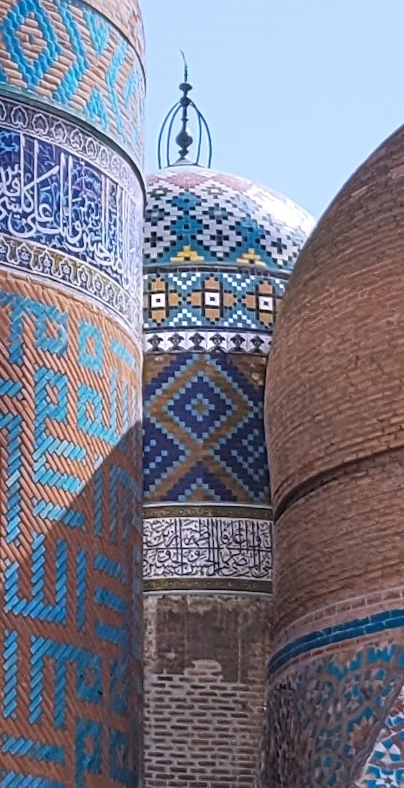
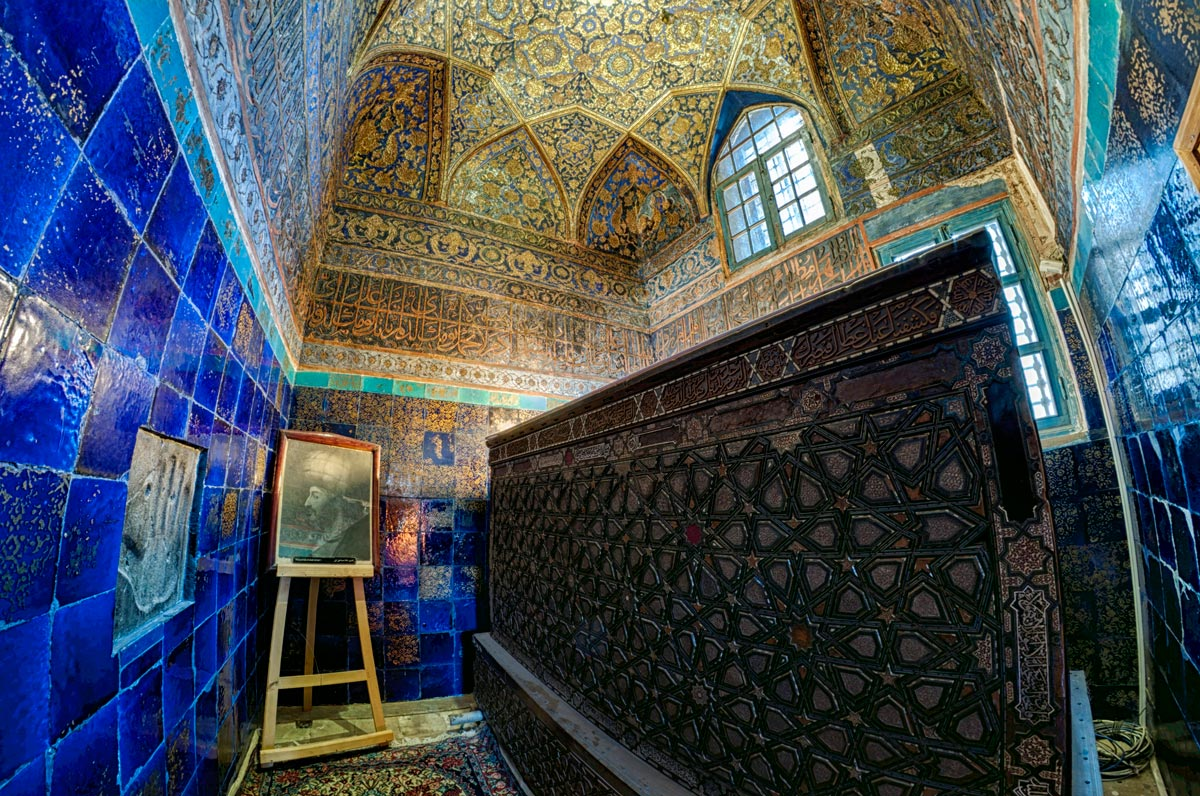
The Tomb of Shah Ismail was built by his wife Tajlu Khanum in 1524, during the reign of Shah Tahmasp, in the Sheikh Safi al-Din Khānegāh and Shrine Ensemble in Ardabil.

Like his predecessor, Shah Tahmasp, at the beginning of his reign (1524–1555) stayed rather inactive in architectural matters, contenting himself with restorations and embellishments, always along the lines of the dynasties which preceded him. In particular, the great mosques of Kerman, Shiraz and Isfahan, and the sanctuaries of Mashhad and Ardabil benefited from his attention. In the latter place, one can cite the funeral tower of Shah Ismail, which was commissioned by Shah Ismail's wife Tajlu Khanum in 1524, at the beginning of Shah Tahmasp's reign. It is situated right next to the funeral tower of the founder of the dynasty and, because of this proximity, has a restrained diameter. It looks therefore a little diminished by its neighbouring monument. Tall in measurement, it contains three small superposed cupolas, and flaunts a ceramic decor divided into numerous registers to avoid monotony. The yellow colour of the decorative ceramic is, however, a totally new element.

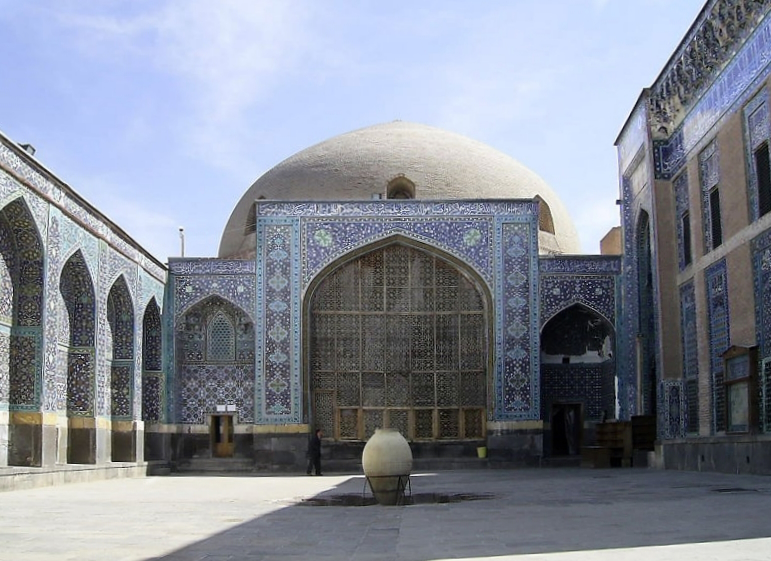
The Jannatsarā was built by Shah Tahmasp in 1537 at the Shrine of Sheikh Safi, Ardabil.

Also at Ardabil is attributed to Shah Tahmasp the Jannat Sara, an octagonal building with accessories and gardens much degraded in the 18th century (and greatly restored). Situated at the north-east of the tomb, it dates, according to Morton, to the years 1536–1540. Its main use is still debated, because it's mentioned as a mosque in European sources, but not in Persian ones, which raises certain questions. Was it planned to place here the tomb of Shah Tahmasp, actually interred at Mashhad? From this place come the famous carpets of Ardabil (see below).

Also credited to Shah Ismail is a palace at Tabriz, his capital until 1555, of which nothing survives except a description by the Italian traveller Michele Membre, who visited Tabriz in 1539. According to him, it was composed of a garden surrounded by walls of stone and earth with two gates of a great meydan at the east, and of a new mosque.

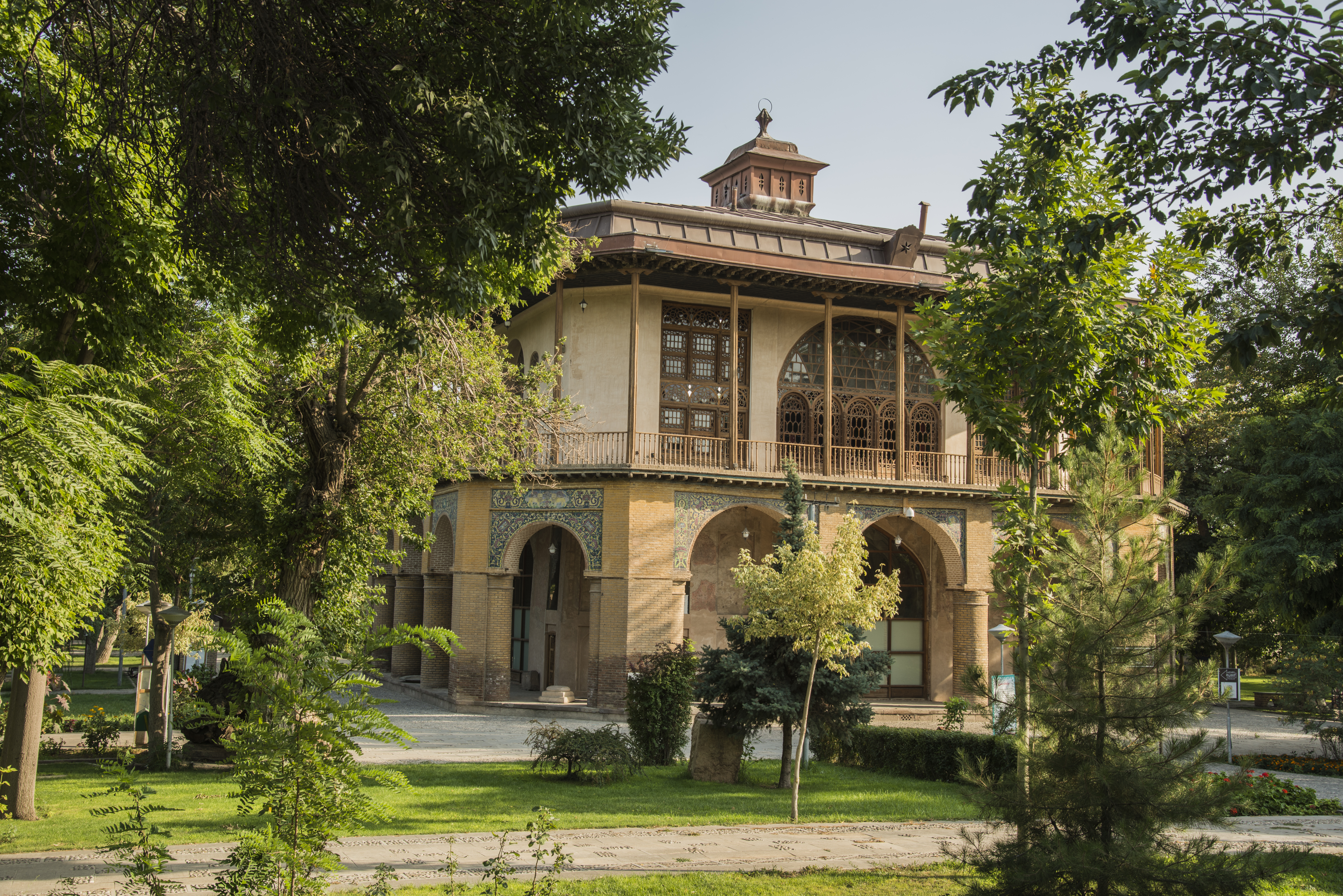
The Chehel Sutun in Qazvin is attributed to Shah Tahmasp

At the end of his reign, Tahmasp organized the gardens of Sadatabad. This, like all Persian gardens, is divided in four by two perpendicular alleys and bordered by a canal, an arrangement found particularly in the tapis-jardins (literally carpet gardens) of the same period. It contains baths, four covered walkways and three pleasure pavilions: the Gombad-e Muhabbat, the Iwan-e Bagh and the Chehel Sutun. The name of the latter, built in 1556, means "palace of forty columns", a name which is explained by the presence of twenty columns reflected in a pond. In the Persian tradition, the number forty is often used to mean a large quantity. This little construction at one point served as a place of audience, for banquets and for more private uses. It was decorated with panels painted with literary Persian scenes, such as the story of Farhad and Shirin, as well as hunting scenes, festivals and polo, etc. Floral bands surrounded these panels, based on models of Shah Tahmasp himself, to paint at his hours, or again of Muzaffar Ali or Muhammadi, thus used in the royal library.

In the city of Nain, the house of the governor, designed with four iwans, presents a décor undoubtedly elaborated between 1565 and 1575, using a rare and very sophisticated technique: over a coat of red paint, the artist placed a white coating, and then scratched to allow motifs to appear in red silhouette—motifs reminiscent of those in books and on cloth. One finds there animal fights, throned princes, literary scenes (Khosrow and Shirin, Yusuf and Zuleykha), a game of polo, hunting scenes etc. One notices that the silhouettes curve and that the taj, the headdress characteristic of the Safavids at the beginning of the empire had disappeared, following the fashion of the time. Among the scroll patterns are calligraphic representations of the quatrains of the poet Hafiz.

=== Under Shah Abbas ===
The reign of Shah Abbas marked the explosion of Safavid architecture, with the construction of a new Isfahan.

==== Isfahan ====
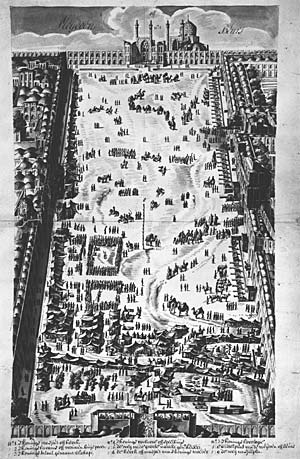
Sketch of the meydan by G. Hofsted van Essen, 1703, library of Leiden University

For the third time in the history of the Safavids, the capital of the empire changed under Shah Abbas: to Isfahan, a city in a more centralized location than Tabriz or Qazvin (which is between Tehran and Tabriz). A new capital was thus set up beside the ancient city, organized around a meydan, a large place 512 metres long by 159 wide. On one side stands the Shah's mosque, on the other the Shah's oratory, called the mosque of Sheikh Lutfallah, while the pavilion Ali Qapu opens onto a large pleasure walkway (Chahar Bagh) and the grand bazaar led to the old mosque on Fridays. Two bridges cross the Zayandeh River, leading to an Armenian section taking the name of Nea Julfa.

===== Ali Qapu =====
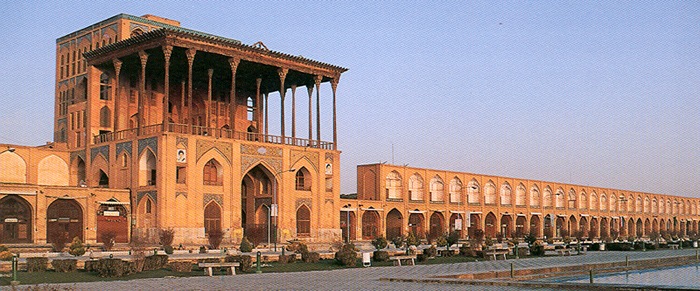
Ali Qapu and arcades of the meydān, Isfahan, beginning of 17th century

A rather tall building, opening on one side onto the meydan and on the other onto the Chahar Bagh, the Ali Qapu pavilion was no doubt built in two stages, according to Galieri, who long studied it. One finds there traits characteristic of Iranian architecture, such as the taste for proportions in two levels: one level, the portico of the upper part (talar), or again the cruciform plan. The décor is often reminiscent of the contemporary book art, with Chinese clouds, birds in flight, and flowering trees portrayed in soft colours. The upper rooms, called music rooms, present a décor of little alcoves the shape of long-necked bottles.

===== The Qaysarieh (grand bazaar) =====
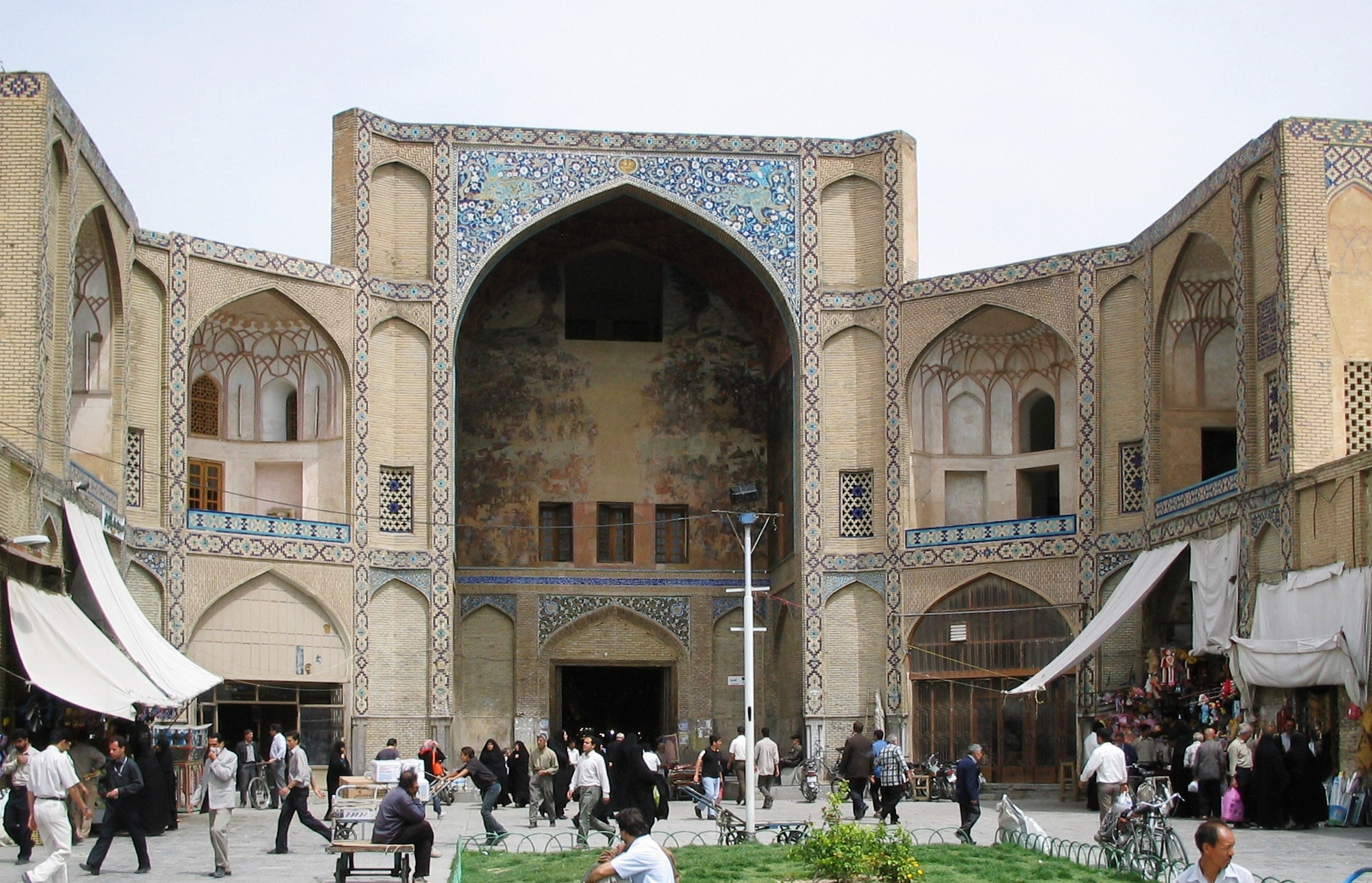
Entrance to the Qaysarieh

The grand bazaar is connected to the old market on one side and to the meydan on the other. On the side opening onto the meydan, its high vault with protruding ribs encloses a multi-story structure, of which the upper part was reserved for the Shah's orchestra while in the lower part were found shops and homes, organized by occupation. Ceramic mosaic decoration is evidence that the Shah had as much interest in architecture for civil purposes as for those of religion or pleasure.

===== The mosque of Sheikh Lutfallah, or the oratory of the Shah =====
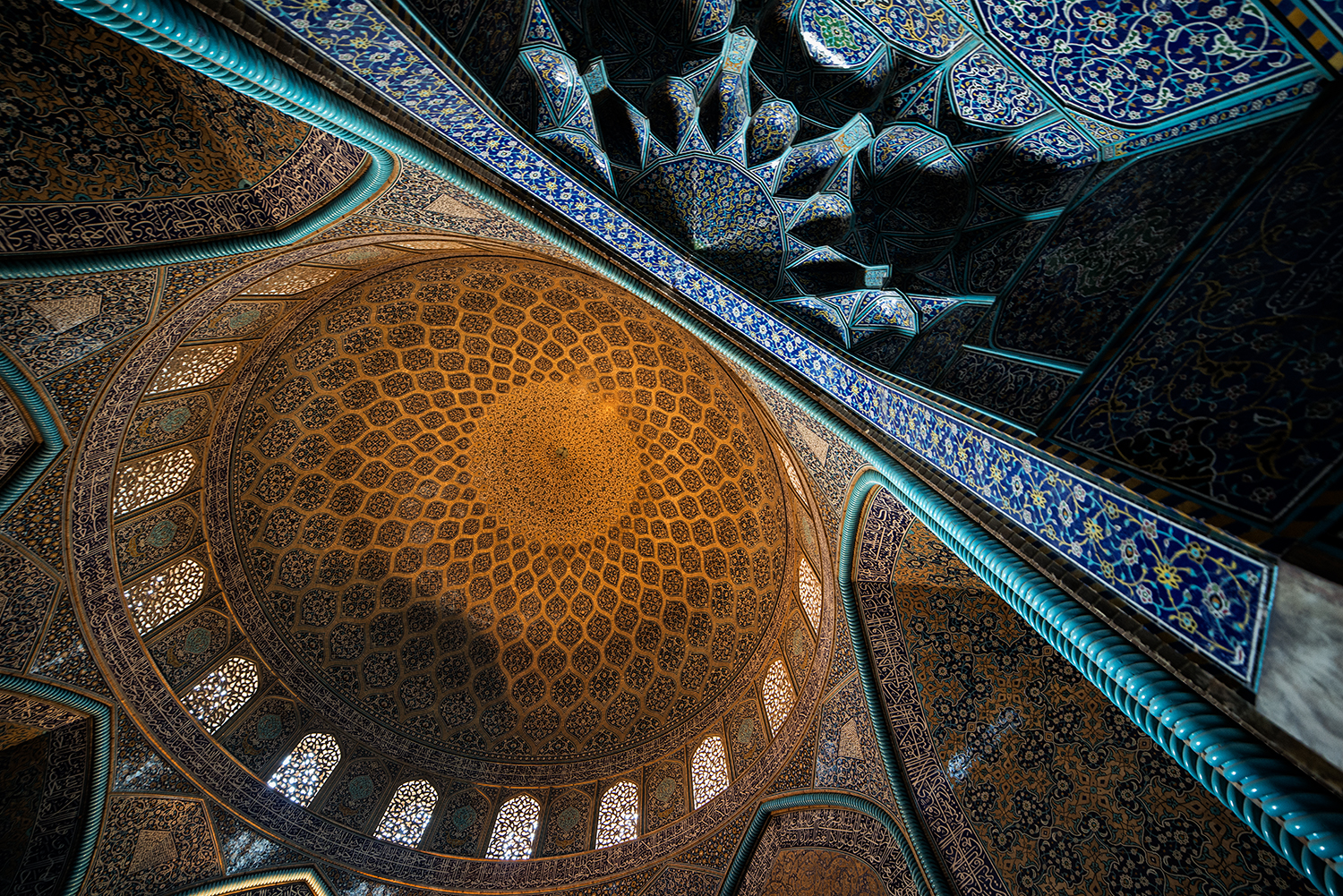
Sheikh Lotfollah Mosque, Isfahan, interior

This mosque was the first to be constructed in the new Isfahan, before the grand mosque of the Shah. Its construction stretched over sixteen long years, but two dates (1616 on the dome and 1618 in the mihrab) tend to show that it was completed around 1618. The architect was Muhammad Riza ibn Husayn, and the calligrapher possibly Reza Abbasi, a great Persian painter and calligrapher.

The plan of this mosque is rather unusual, with a winding, intentionally dim entrance which leads to a prayer room completely covered by a dome and open to a grand portal. The absence of a court is notable. The décor consists of yellow marble, with niches arranged in the sides with rich stalactites, and an outer layer of ceramic. The colouring of the exterior dome is quite unique, dominated by the colour of the earth.

===== The Shah Mosque =====
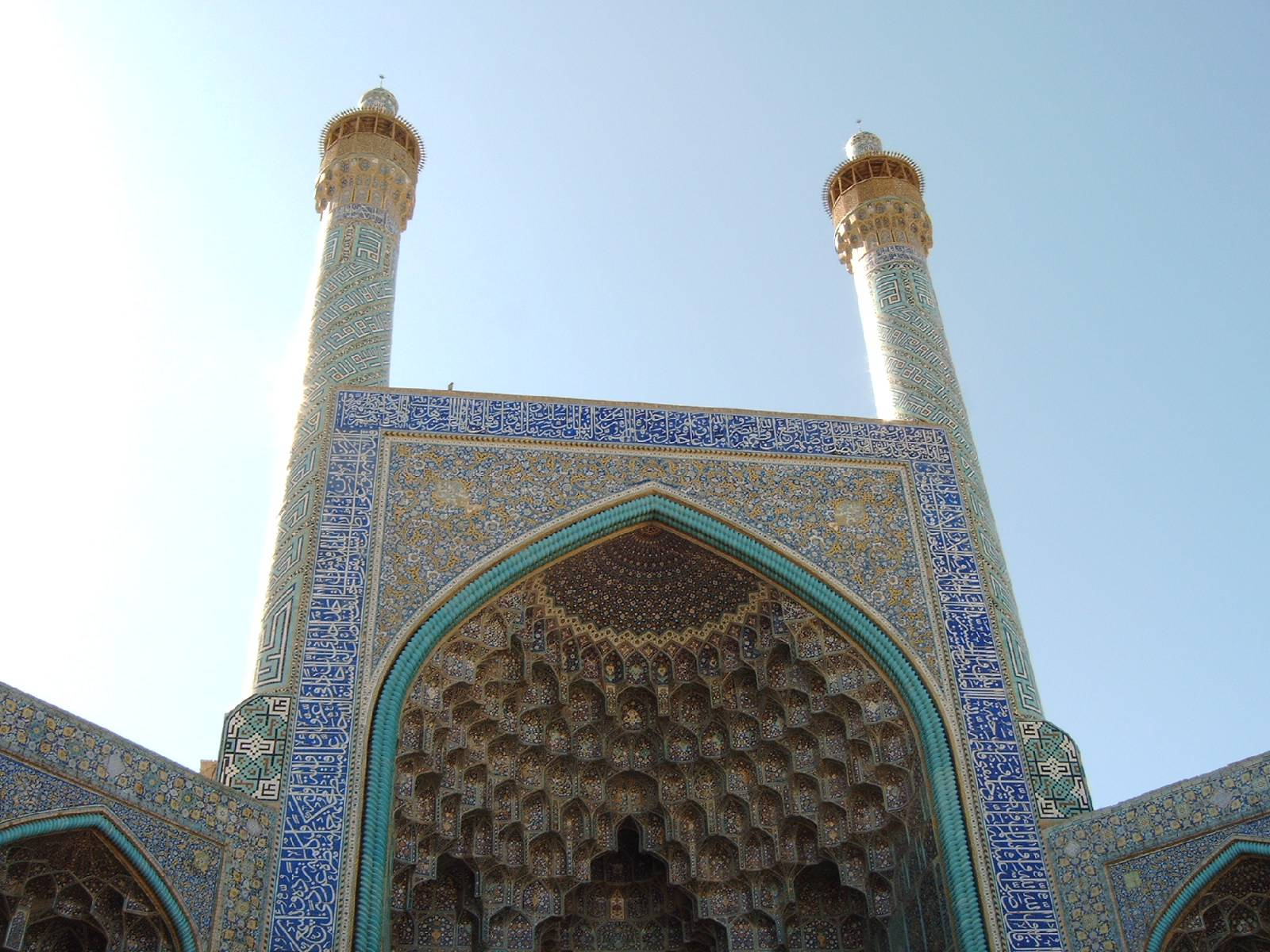
Entrance to the Shah Mosque

The Shah Mosque was built between 1612 and 1630 under the direction of the architects Muhibb al-Din Ali Kula and Ustad Ali Akbar Isfahani. Its dimensions are colossal: 140 metres by 130, equalling a surface area of 18,000 square metres, about the size of three football fields. The plan is however much more orthodox than that of the mosque of Sheikh Luffallah: the mosque is rigorously symmetric, with four iwans and two cupolas, the minarets rising in front of the prayer room. In one part and another of the building are two Madrasahs.

The plan of the building, like its décor, demonstrates a grand coherence. The veneer of ceramic covers all the surface of the walls, but the back of the iwans is often neglected in favour of the façade. The dominant colour is blue, almost giving the impression of a blue mantle, and gives a sense of unity to the ensemble.

===== The Allaverdikhan bridge =====
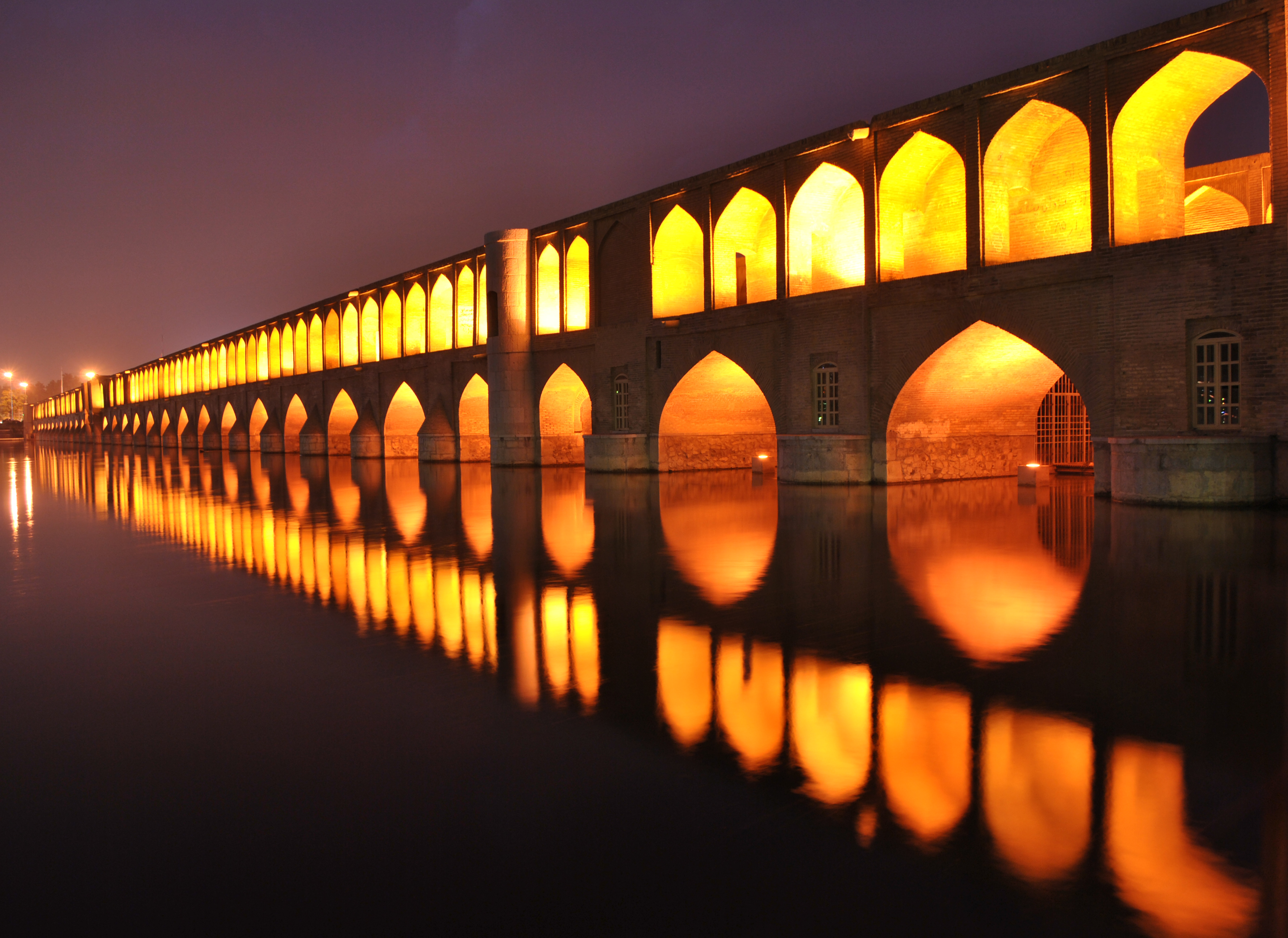
The Allaverdikhan bridge at night

Datable to 1608, this bridge was constructed by the order of Allahverdi Khan, the Georgian minister of Shah Abbas. It is contained in the continuity of Chahar Bagn. With its arcades, in the sides and in the base, it also offers the possibility of strolling on several levels, according to the height of the water. It serves, of course, as a means of passage, but also as a dam, to regulate the flow of the river. As one crosses it, the water seems like a grand fountain, thanks to the "emmarchements". At the side is a talar, the kiosk of mirrors, from which the sovereign could observe the river.

=== Under Shah Abbas II ===
==== The Chehel Sotoun ====
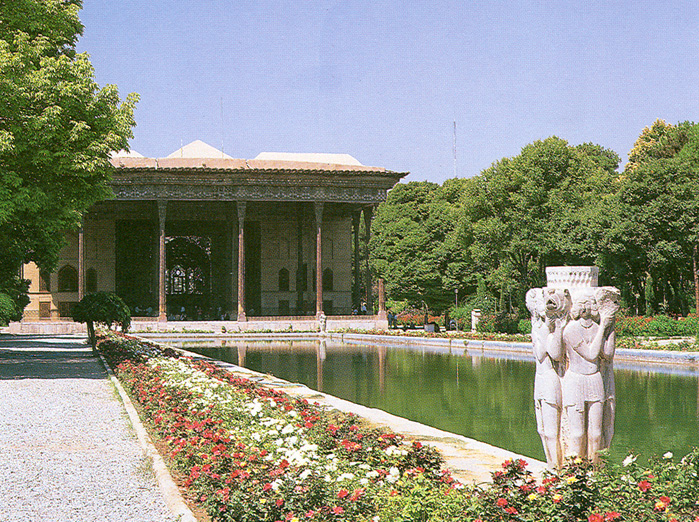
The Chehel Sotoun, 1647–48?, Isfahan

This building, of which the date is much disputed, was no doubt constructed under the reign of Shah Abbas II, then redecorated in the years 1870. According to a poem inscribed on the building and another by Muhammad Ali Sahib Tabrizi, it would have been created in 1647–48, and if some researchers believe that this building was constructed in several stages, the majority are inclined to think that it was built all at once, because it is quite coherent. It's a rectangular building, sporting columns which reflect in the ponds (chehel sotoun meaning "forty columns" in Persian).

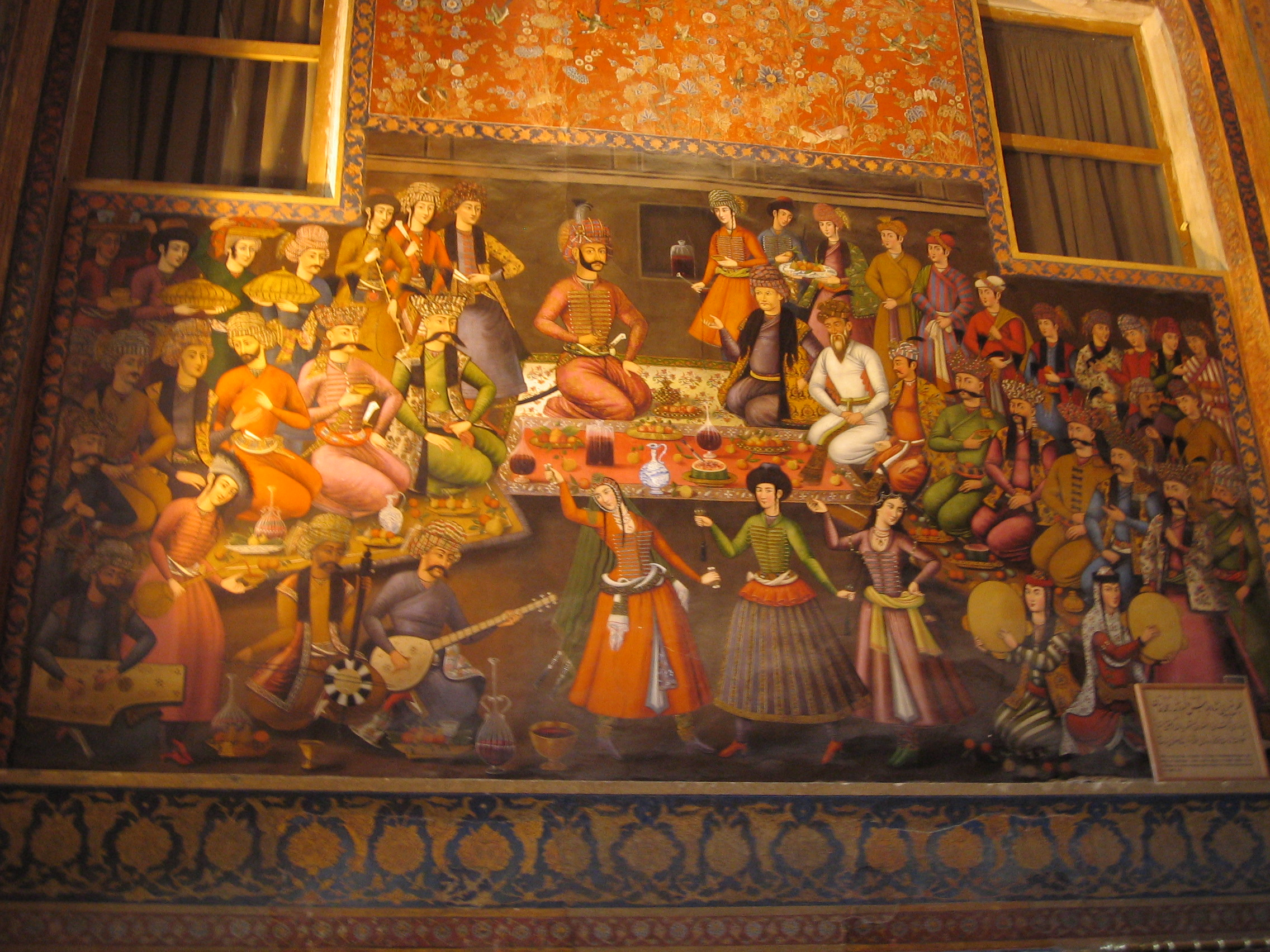
Fresco from the Chehel Sutun: Shah Abbas II and his court

The Chehel Sotoun is decorated with grand historic paintings, exalting the magnanimity or the courage in battle of various grand sovereigns of the dynasty: a battle scene with Shah Ismail; the Mughal sultan Humayun is received by Shah Tahmasp, then Vali Nadr Muhammad Khan, sovereign of Bukhara between 1605 and 1608, by Shah Abbas I, and finally, one finds an evocation of the taking of Kandahar by Shah Abbas II, which must have been added later, the city not having fallen until 1649. In the secondary rooms, too, are found numerous gallant scenes and figures on foot. One notes Western influences in the décor (the opening onto a landscape; similarities with the Armenian neighbourhood) and Indian influences (a horse represented tinted in henna; iwans covered with mirrors.)

==== Khaju Bridge ====
The second large[st] bridge of Isfahan, built 50 years after the Pol-e Allahverdikhan, the Khaju bridge presents a structure which is similar but slightly more complex, with [brise-flots] in a fan-shaped pattern, allowing for more spectacular water effects.

=== The end of the period ===
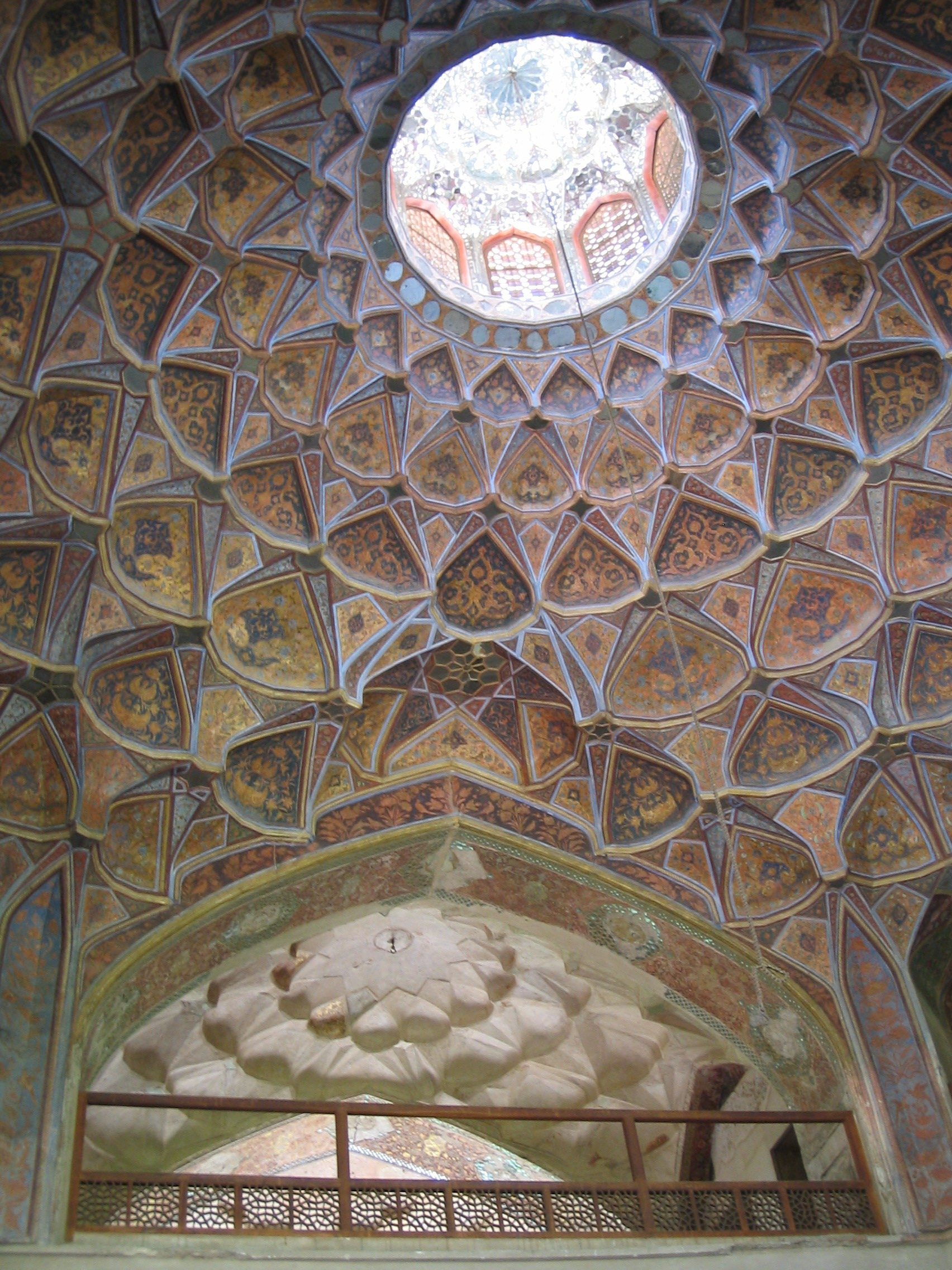
Ceiling of Hasht Behesht, Isfahan

One can still evoke two buildings of Isfahan, dating from the late Safavid period. The Hasht Behesht (the "eight paradises") is composed of a pavilion with eight little entities distributed around a large room under a cupola with four iwans. Small vaults crown the secondary rooms, decorated with mirrors which make the surfaces appear to be moving. The exterior decor, in ceramic, is remarkable for its extensive use of yellow. This building is dated to the years 1671.

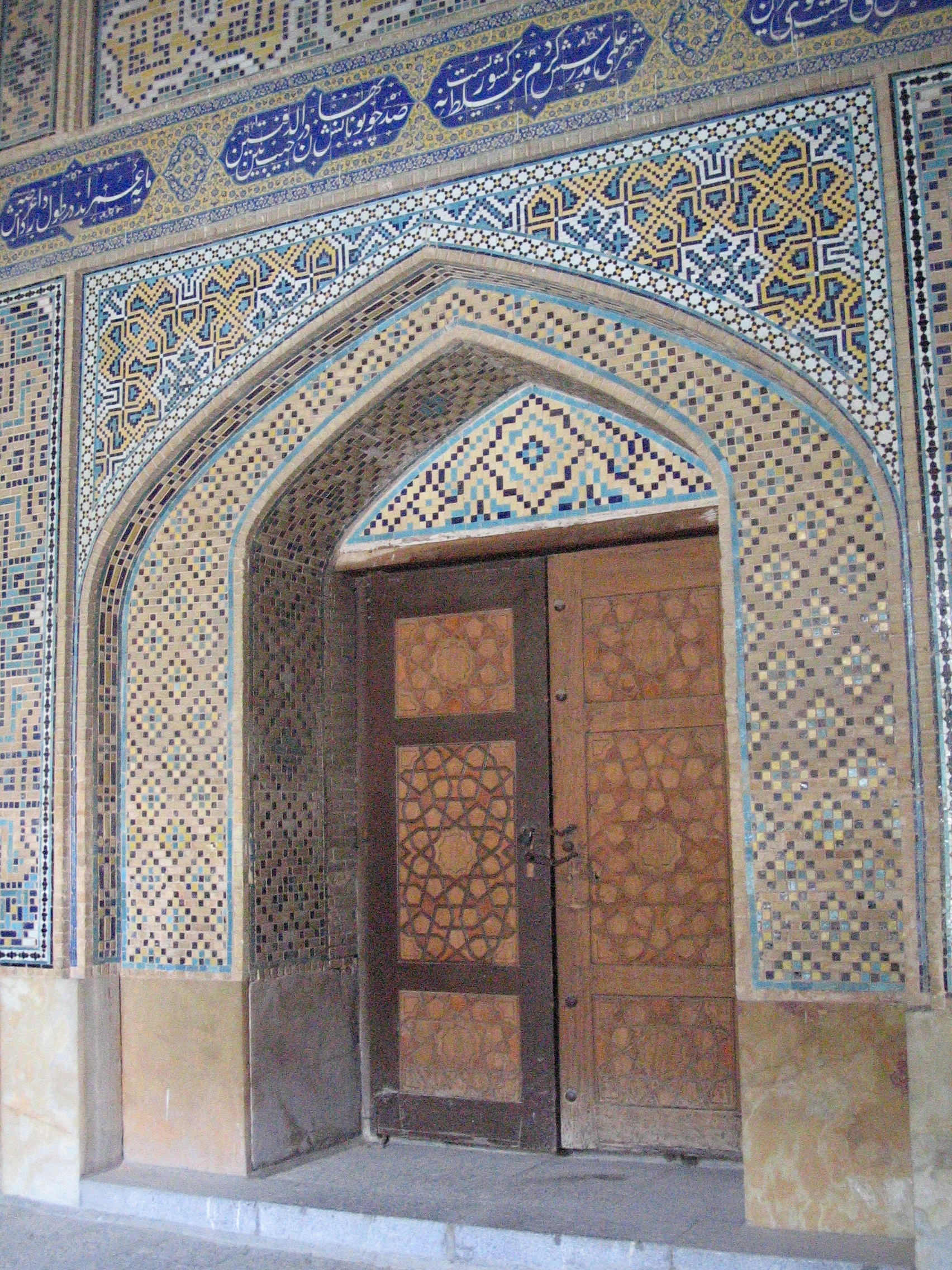
Door in the madreseh Mādar-e Shah, Isfahan

The madreseh Madar-e Shah, or madreseh of the mother of the Shah, is on the Chahar Bagh and is dated 1706–1714. It carries no architectural innovation, and therefore evokes the stagnation of architecture of this period: a plan of four iwans and a dome reminiscent of the mosque of the Shah form the major part of its architectural elements. The decor, highly geometric, is on the other hand a little different from that of the 17th century, with a palette dominated by yellow, green and gold, and a denser network of vegetation than that in the Shah's mosque.

== Art ==
=== Ceramic ===
==== Under Shah Ismail and Shah Tahmasp ====
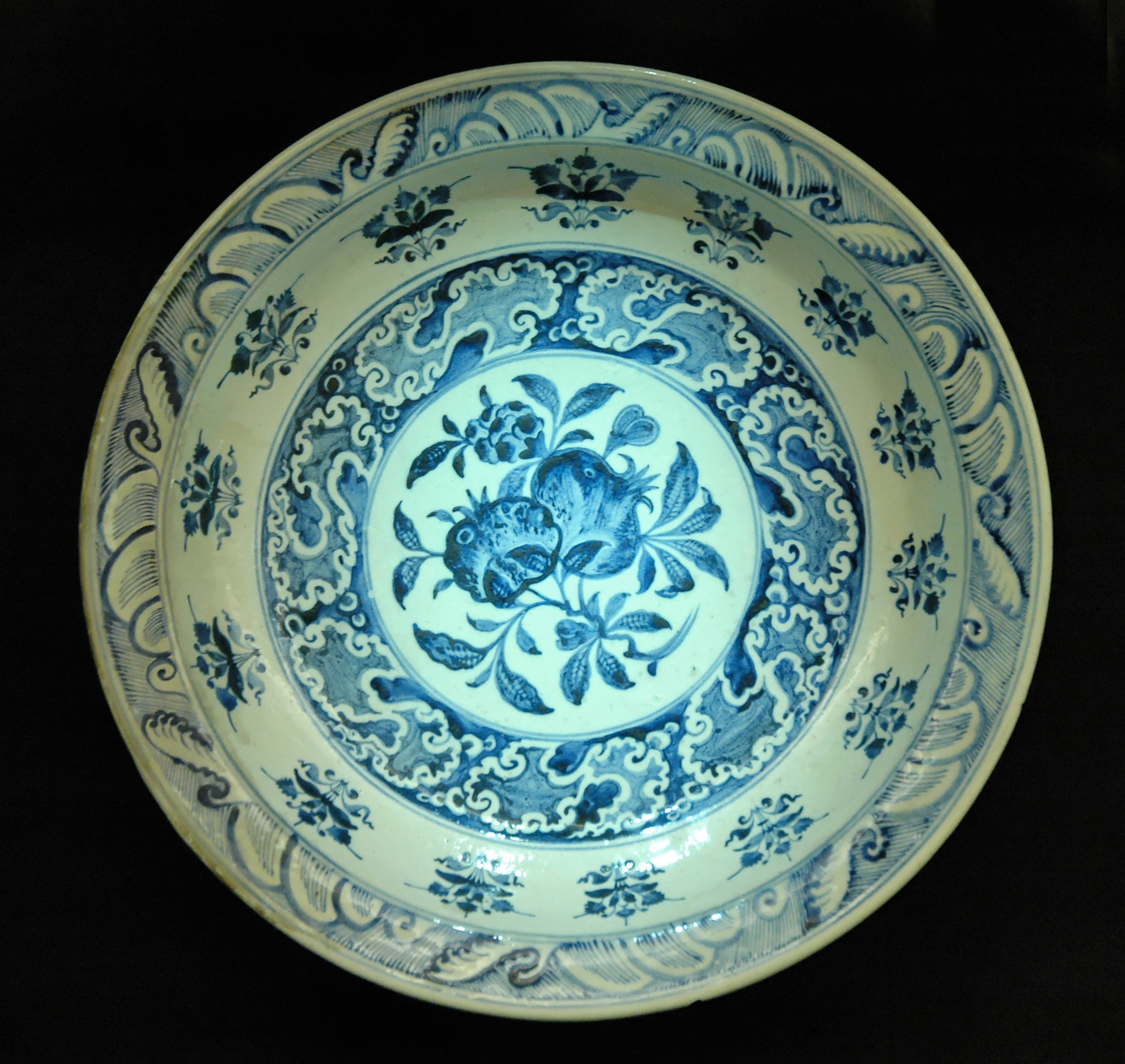
Plate decorated with two pomegranates, v. 1500, the Louvre

The study and dating of ceramics under Shah Ismail and Shah Tahmasp is difficult because there are few pieces which are dated or which mention the place of production. It is also known that the most powerful personages preferred Chinese porcelain by far over locally produced ceramics. Many locations of workshops have, however, been identified, although not with certainty:

- Nishapur
- Kubachi (for architectural ceramic)
- Kerman (moulded monochromatic pieces)
- Mashhad
- Yazd (based on a cistern at the British Museum)
- Shiraz (cited by Chardin)
- Bordabas
- Gambrun
- Nain

The first five are more certain than the last four, having been cited in the sources, but no one is absolutely certain.

In general, the decors tend to imitate those of Chinese porcelain, with the production of blue and white pieces with Chinese form and motifs (curved marly, chi clouds, dragons etc.) In any case, the Persian blue is distinguished from the Chinese blue by its more numerous and subtle nuances. Often, quatrains by Persian poets, sometimes related to the destination of the piece (allusion to wine for a goblet, for example) occur in the scroll patterns. One can also notice a completely different type of decor, much more rare, which carries iconography very specific to Islam (Islamic zodiac, bud scales, arabesques) and seems influenced by the Ottoman world, as is evidenced by feather-edged anthemions (honeysuckle ornaments) widely used in Turkey.

Numerous types of pieces were produced: goblets, plates, long-necked bottles, spittoons, etc. Canteens can be noted with very small necks and bellies that are flat on one side and very rounded on the other: an example is found at Victoria and Albert Museum, another at Winter Palace.

==== Between the reign of Shah Abbas and the end of the empire ====
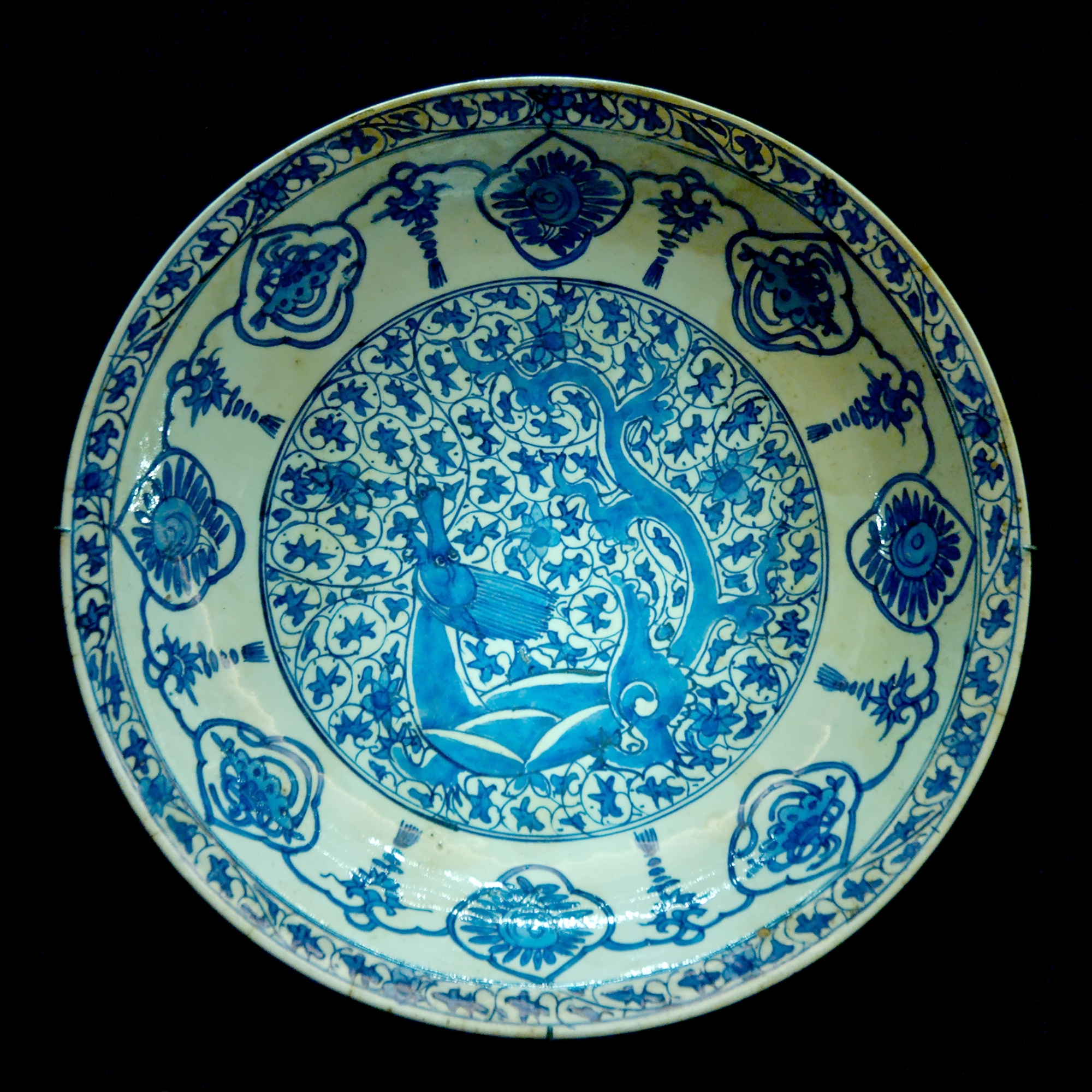
Plate decorated with dragon, 17th century, inspired from 15th-century Chinese blue and white ceramic, the Louvre

Among the petrographic ceramics one can distinguish four groups, each linked to a method of production:

- Lias
- Mashhad
- Tabriz (a centre which remains hypothetical, possibly with a workshop supported by royal beneficence)
- an unidentified centre which produced blues and whites imitating Wanli ceramic (kraak porcelain)

With the closing of the Chinese market in 1659, Persian ceramic soared to new heights, to fulfill European needs. The appearance of false marks of Chinese workshops on the backs of some ceramics marked the taste that developed in Europe for far-eastern porcelain, satisfied in large part by Safavid production. This new destination led to wider use of Chinese and exotic iconography (elephants) and the introduction of new forms, sometimes astonishing (hookahs, octagonal plates, animal-shaped objects).

During the same time period, new figures, influenced by the art of the book: young, elegant cupbearers, young women with curved silhouettes, or yet cypress trees entangling their branches, reminiscent of the paintings of Reza Abbasi. One notes the use of beautiful yellows, and of the technique of lustre still present in some pieces in the 17th and 18th centuries.

==== An exceptional case: the ceramic of Kubacha ====
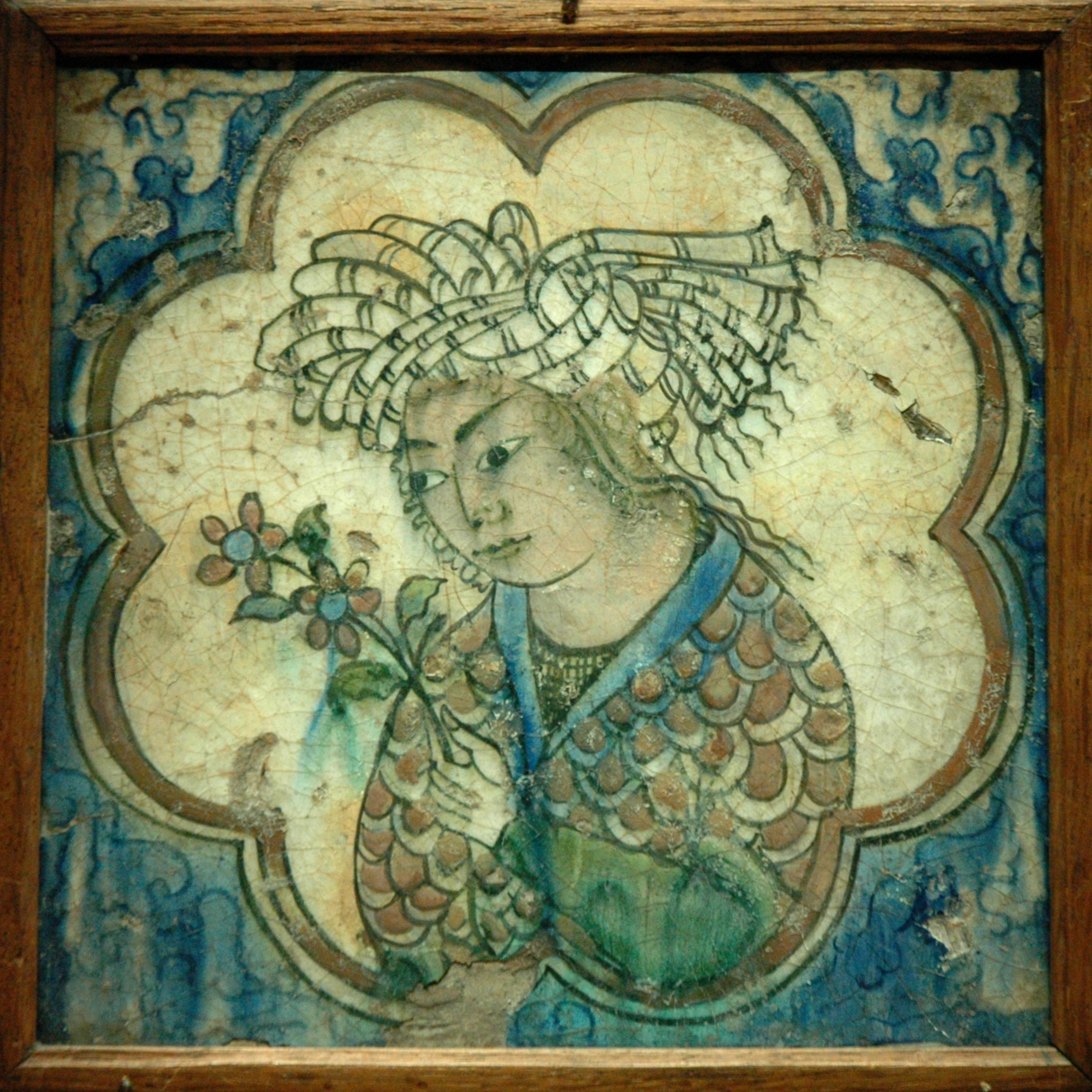
Tile with young man. Earthenware, painted on slip and under transparent glaze. Northwestern Iran, Kubacha ware, 17th century.

The discovery, on the walls of houses of Kubacha, of ceramics of a very homogeneous style rapidly led historians to believe that there existed a centre of production in the city. This interpretation was however contested by Arthur Lane and many others after him, and seems today to be erroneous.

This series was produced over three centuries, in the course of which it evolved greatly, but always kept a hole in the bases for the hanging of the pieces. Schematically, one can distinguish three periods:

- In the 15th century, two-coloured with green glaze and motifs painted in black.
- In the 16th century, two-coloured with turquoise glaze and motifs still in black.
- In the 18th century, multicoloured (cobalt, soft red [rouge terne], orangish-yellow), with influences from the art of the book and from Ottoman and Indian [art].

The Kubacha series remains very mysterious, and many centres of production have been proposed without any real resolution of the issue.

==== Architectural tilework ====
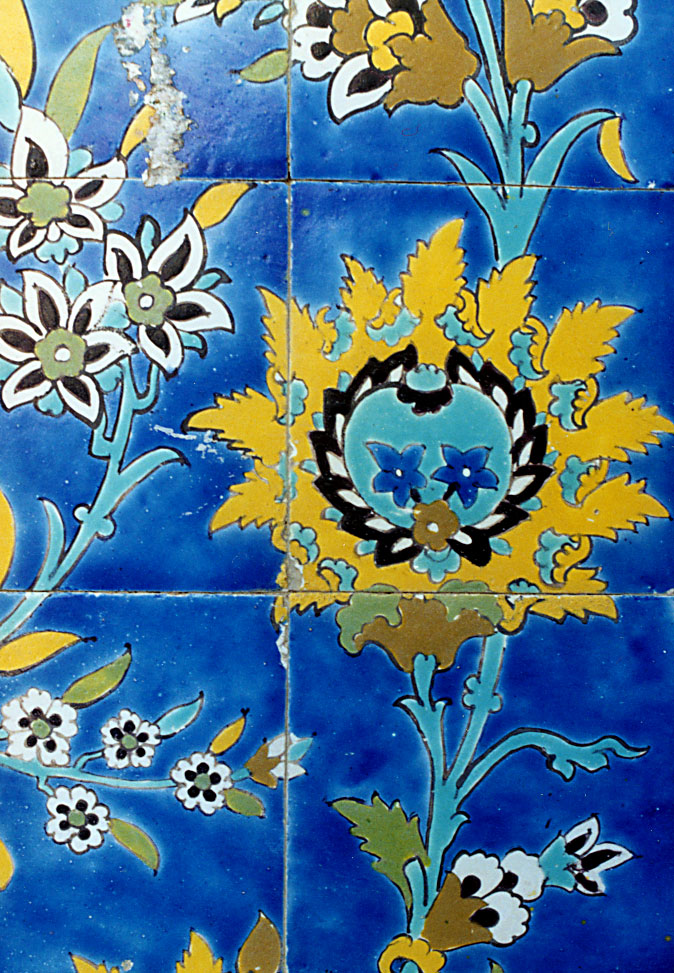
Haft-rang tiles, Sheikh Lotfollah Mosque, Isfahan, 1619.

The Safavid dynasty saw a large amount of ceramic tiles produced for the decoration of important buildings. Shah Abbas' monumental urban expansion in the new part of Isfahan at the beginning of the 17th century led to the city becoming famed for its many Safavid-era tiled buildings, for example. During this time, the labour intensive mo'araq (tile mosaic) technique continued to be used, but was often replaced by haft-rang (or cuerda seca) underglazed tiles which were easier to produce. Decorative tiles employed Chinese-derived symbols like lotuses, dianthuses, peonies and cloud motifs, alongside traditional Islamic arabesque patterns, to cover the walls of mosques, shrines and madrasas with a rich variety of floral and geometric designs.

=== Metallic art ===
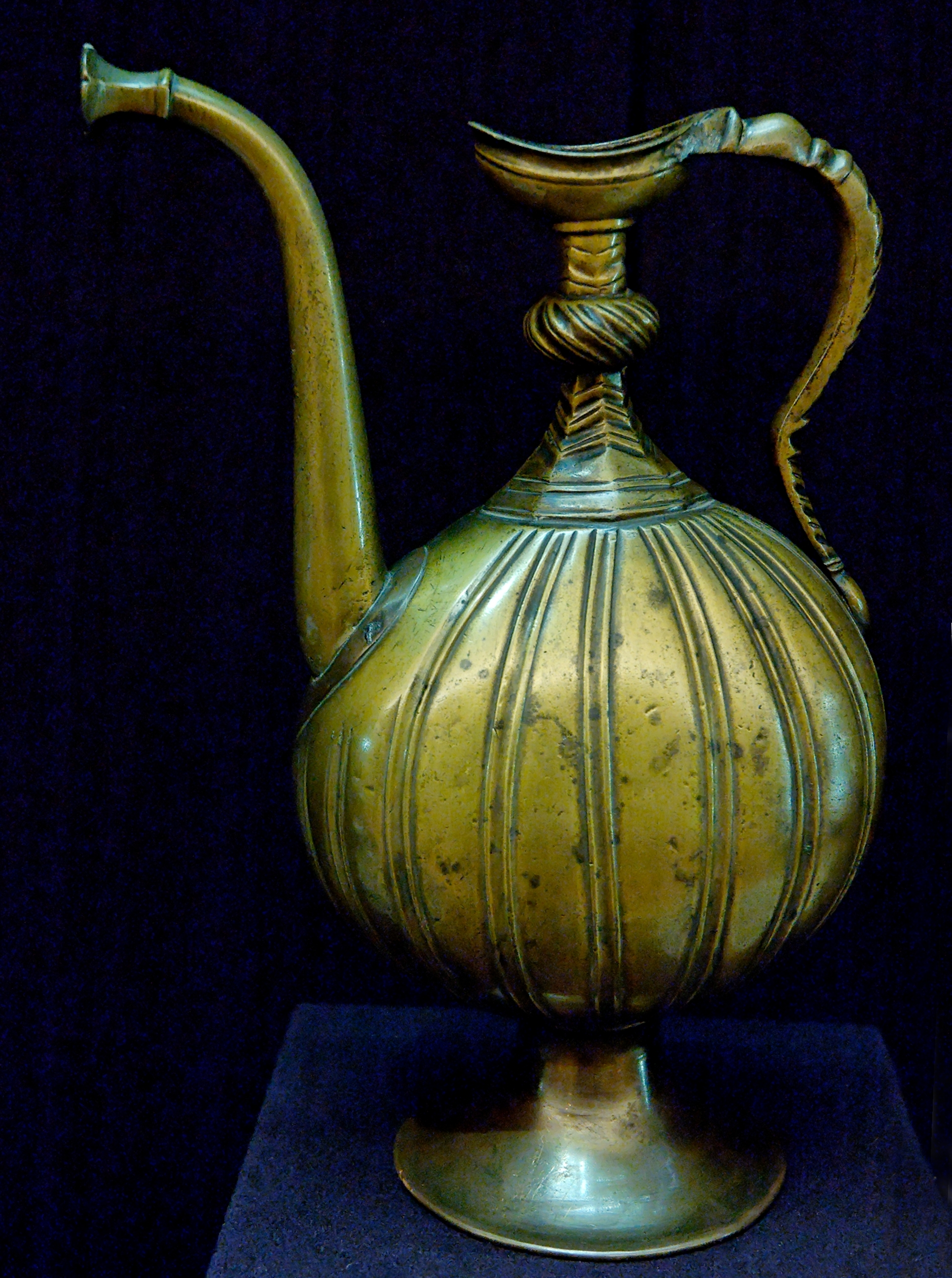
Pitcher. Bronze, Iran, 16th century. Musée du Louvre

Metallic art underwent a gradual decline during the Safavid dynasty, and remains difficult to study, particularly because of the small number of dated pieces.

Under Shah Ismail, metalwork continued the shapes and decorations of Timurid inlays: motifs of almond-shaped glories, of shamsa (suns) and of chi clouds are found on the inkwells in the form of mausoleums or the globular pitchers reminiscent of one by Ulugh Beg'.

Under Shah Tahmasp, inlays disappeared rapidly, as witnessed by a group of candlesticks in the form of pillars. This period also saw the appearance of coloured paste (red, black, green) to replace the multicolouration previously supplied by the inlays of silver and gold. This period saw the beginning of steelwork, in particular piercings, to actualize the elements of plating of doors and of standards.

=== Work in hard stone ===
We know of several hardstone carvings, most often datable to the 16th century. A series of pitchers with globular bellies also exists, mounted on a little ring-shaped base and having wide, short necks. Two of these (one in black jade inlaid with gold, the other in white jade) are inscribed with the name of Ismail I. The handle is in the shape of a dragon, which betrays a Chinese influence, but this type of pitcher comes in fact directly from the preceding period: its prototype is the pitcher of Ulough Beg. We also know of blades and handles of knives in jade, often inlaid with gold wire and engraved.

Hardstone serves also to make jewels to inlay in metal objects, such as the great zinc bottle inlaid with gold, rubies and turquoise dated to the reign of Ismail and conserved at the museum of Topkapi in Istanbul.

=== Persian carpets ===
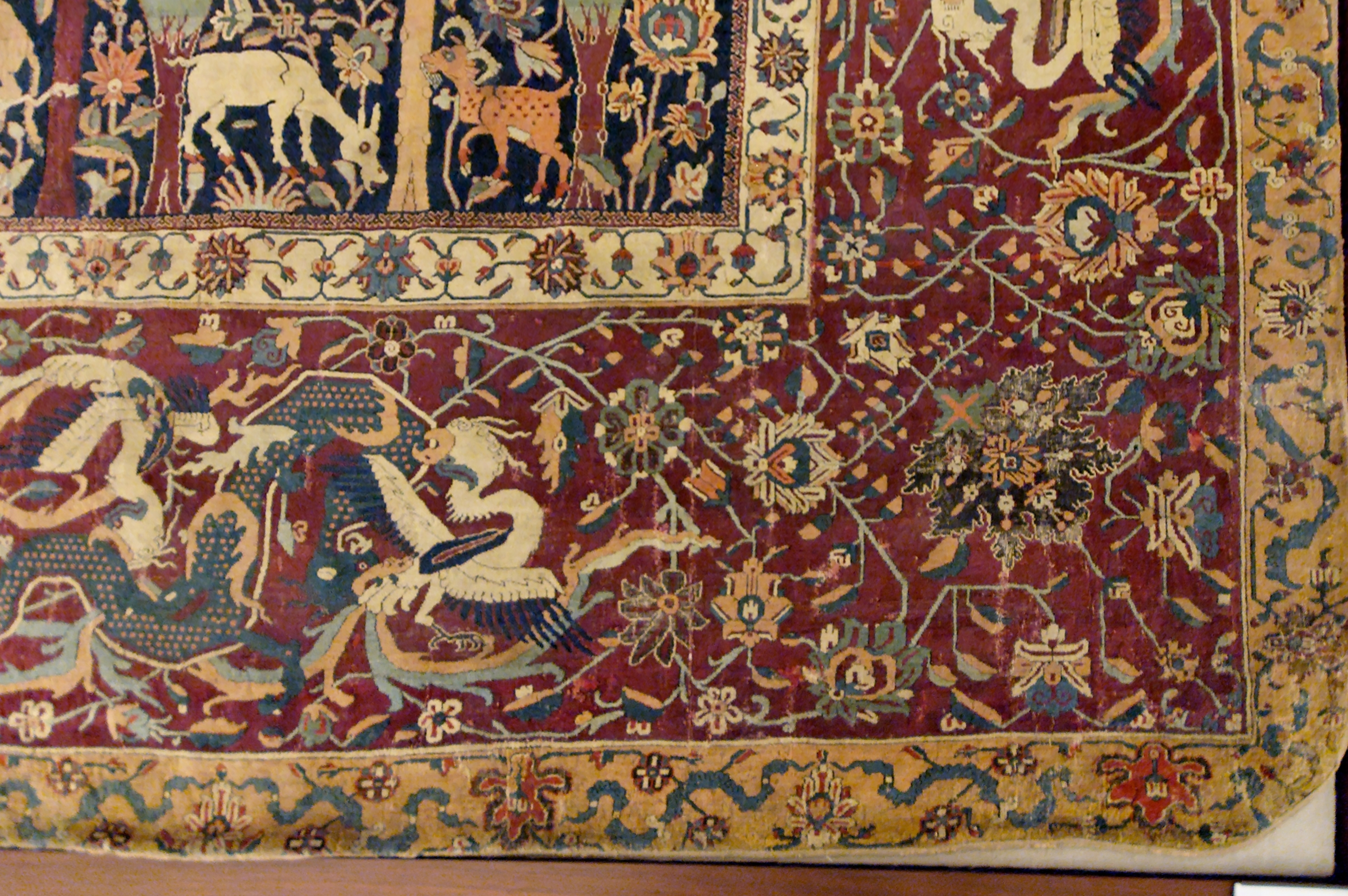
Detail from the "Mantes carpet", depicting animal and hunting scenes. Northwestern Iran, 16th century. Warp and weft: wool; pile: wool; knot: asymmetrical. The carpet once covered the floor of the collegiate church of Mantes-la-Jolie (Yvelines, France), hence its name. (Louvre).

Numerous carpets (between 1500 and 2000) have been conserved since the Safavid period, but the dating and establishment of the origin of these carpets remains very difficult. The inscriptions are a valuable indicator for determining the artists, the places of fabrication, the sponsors etc. In addition, once a carpet has been made and has stayed in a particular place, it allows other pieces related to it to be identified.

It is generally accepted among specialists that it was the Safavids who transformed the carpet from production by artists assured by nomadic tribes to the status of a "national industry" of which the products were exported to India, into the Ottoman Empire and to Europe. During the Safavid period, the export of carpets flourished, to destinations in Europe (sometimes via the Portuguese colony of Goa) and to the Mughal Empire, where Persian carpets stimulated local production. Some Safavid carpets were also transported by the Dutch East India Company towards Jakarta, Sri Lanka, Malaysia, Kochi, India as well as to the Netherlands. European orders came to the Persian Empire for the weaving of special carpets: for example, the group of "Polish carpets" was undoubtedly knotted in Isfahan, but certain ones carry the arms of Poland.

Based on accounts by travellers and other written sources, it appears that workshops for royal carpets existed in Ispahan, Kashan and Kerman. These workshops produced carpets for the palace and mosques of the Shah, but also to be offered to neighbouring monarchs or to foreign dignitaries, or pieces made on order for the nobility or ordinary citizens. Such sponsorship provided capital in the form of raw materials and provided a salary for the artisans for the duration of the weaving.

The rapid development of the carpet industry in the Persian Empire during the Safavid period seems to be due to the sovereigns' taste for this art form. Ismail I, then Shah Tahmasp and Shah Abbas I are known for having been personally interested in carpet production. One has also supposed that the two latter sovereigns were personally invested in the production of carpets, notably by the design of the motifs. During their reigns, the production of Persian carpets was the most prominent out of the whole Safavid period.

It was in this period and particularly since Shah Tahmasp that the first carpets with floral decoration were created, in order to satisfy the taste of the Safavids. The difference between the carpets of the nomads and the floral ones is due to the role of the "master" (ostad), who draws the pattern which will be reproduced by the knotters. The designs of the carpets of the nomads are themselves transmitted by tradition.

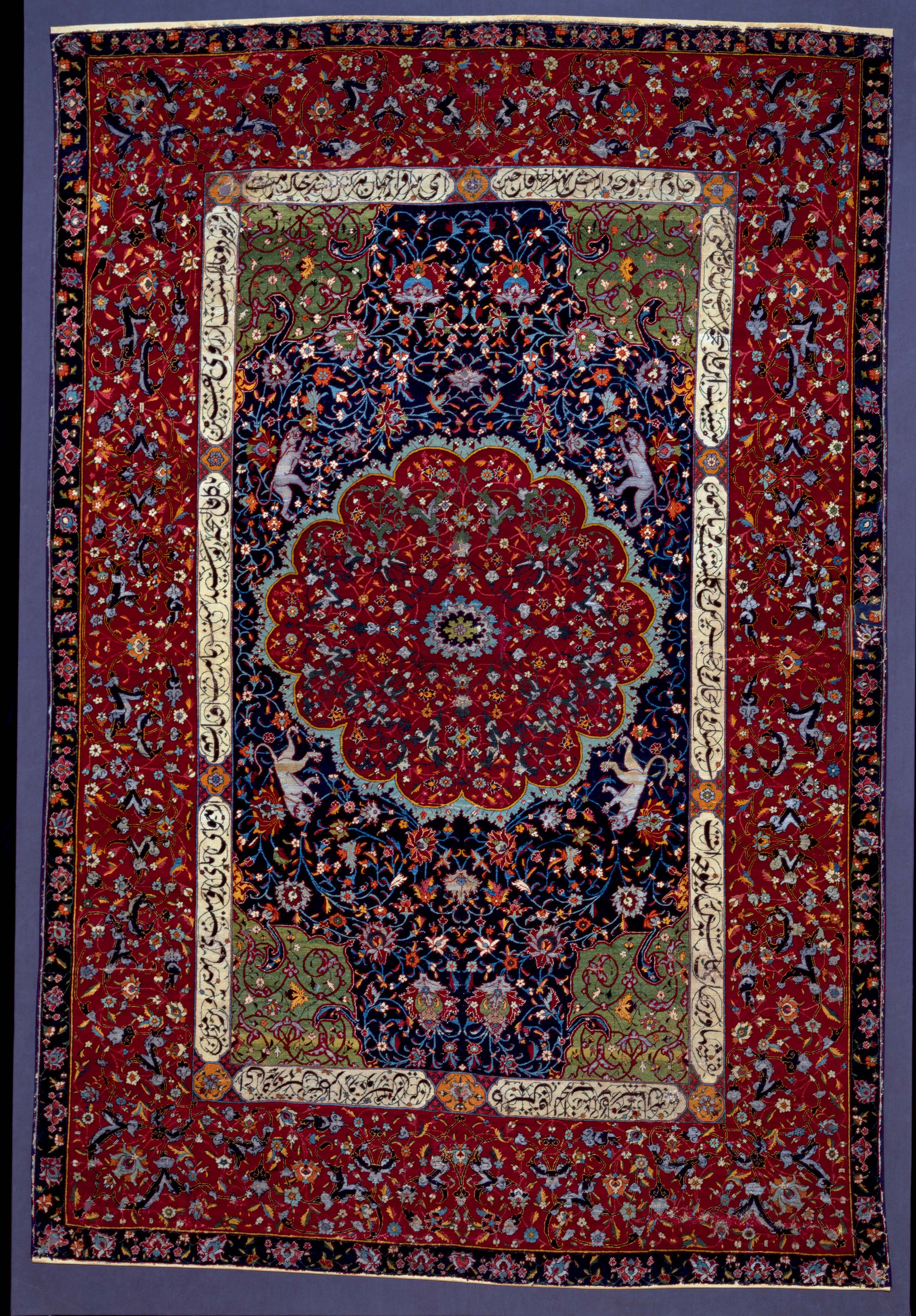
Medallion carpet, 16th century, Khalili Collection of Islamic Art

The production of carpets was strongly influenced by the leadership of the art of the book, which provided the patterns. Thus, on comparing them with bookbindings and illuminations, specialists have been able to discern a stylistic evolution. Thus, the majority of the carpets produced during the 16th century, that is, principally under Shah Ismail and Shah Tahmasp, are called "with medallion" because they are organized around a large central multi-lobed medallion sometimes called Shamsa, that is "sun", and the corner decorations each carry a quarter of a medallion which is strongly reminiscent of that in the centre. The most famous carpets of this type are the pair of carpets said to be of Ardébil, of which one, conserved at the Victoria and Albert Museum, is dated 946 since the Hijra, that is 1539–40 A.D. and signed "Work of the humble servant of the court of Mahmud Hashani".

From the end of the 16th and the beginning of the 17th century, that is with the coming into power of Shah Abbas, the medallion tended to disappear, since the corner decorations could already have been eliminated by the second half of the 16th century, as is shown by the Mantes carpet. It's the flowering of "vase carpets", which, as their name indicates, display a vase from which springs a floral arrangement. The garden, which is associated with paradise, equally gives place to a type of composition which appeared in the 17th century in Persia in imitation of the gardens of the Shah, divided in rectangular parcels or squares by alleys and irrigation canals (chahar bāgh).

There are also carpets with the theme of hunting, an activity prized by the Shahs and requiring address, strength, and knowledge of nature. This theme is also linked to paradise and to spiritual activities, because the hunt often unfolds in a wilderness which can be reminiscent of the gardens of paradise. One of the finest is undoubtedly the apparently tabrizi carpet, currently conserved at the Museo Poldi Pezzoli, and dated 1542–43. The Mantes carpet, dated to the second half of the 16th century and conserved at the Louvre, is equally of this exemplary calibre.

The village of Kashan for its part was distinguished by a very particular production of relatively small carpets entirely of silk, with a blue or red base, showing fights between fantastic animals borrowed from the Chinese (kilins, dragons, phoenixes). As with the large carpets, those of the 16th century display a medallion (carpet of the Gulbenkian Foundation), which disappeared in the following century. The Louvre and the Metropolitan Museum are each freely conserving an example.

== The art of the book ==
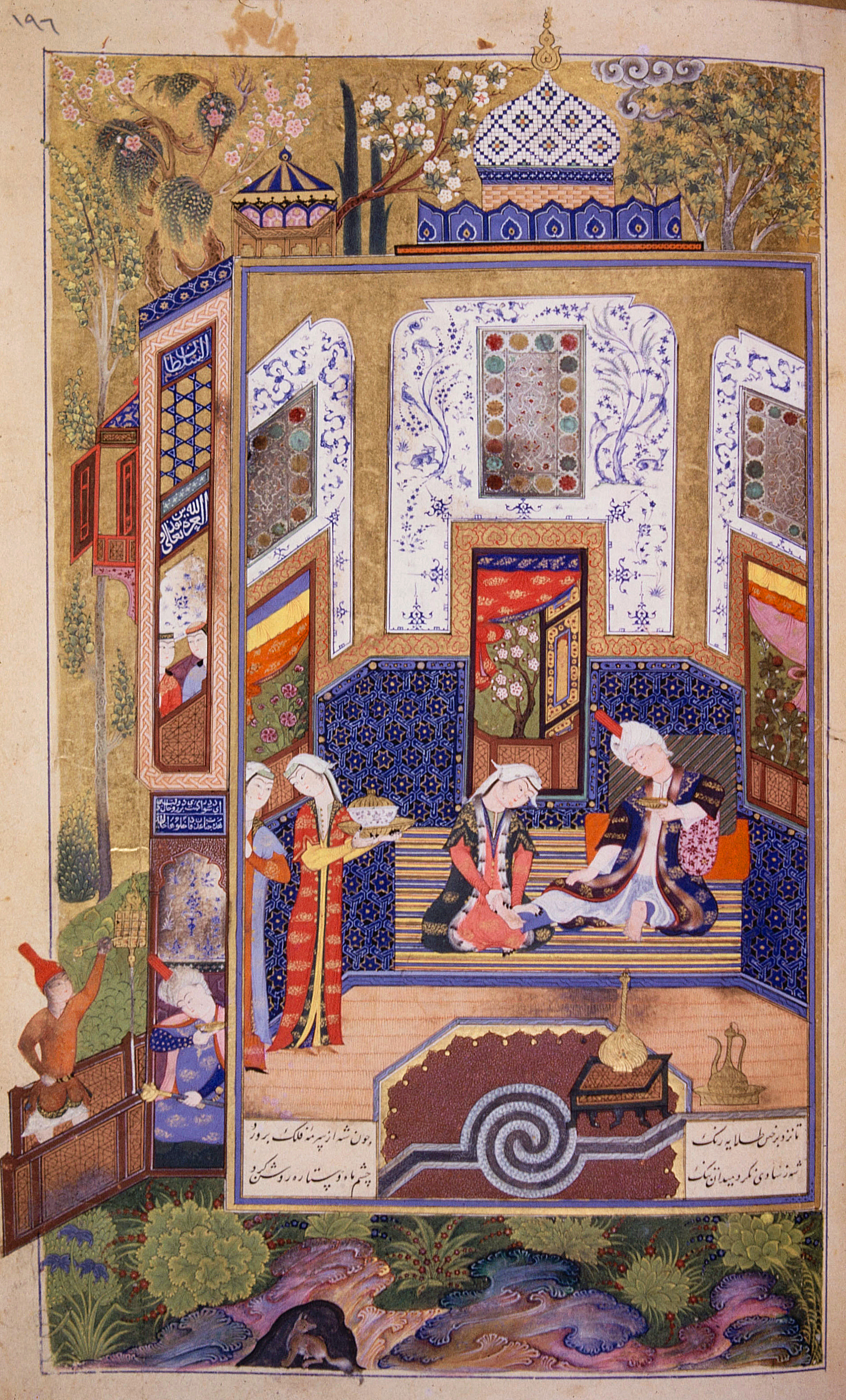
Bahram Gur in the White Pavilion, Khamsa of Nizami (Topkapi H. 762). Tabriz, added under Shah Ismail circa 1505

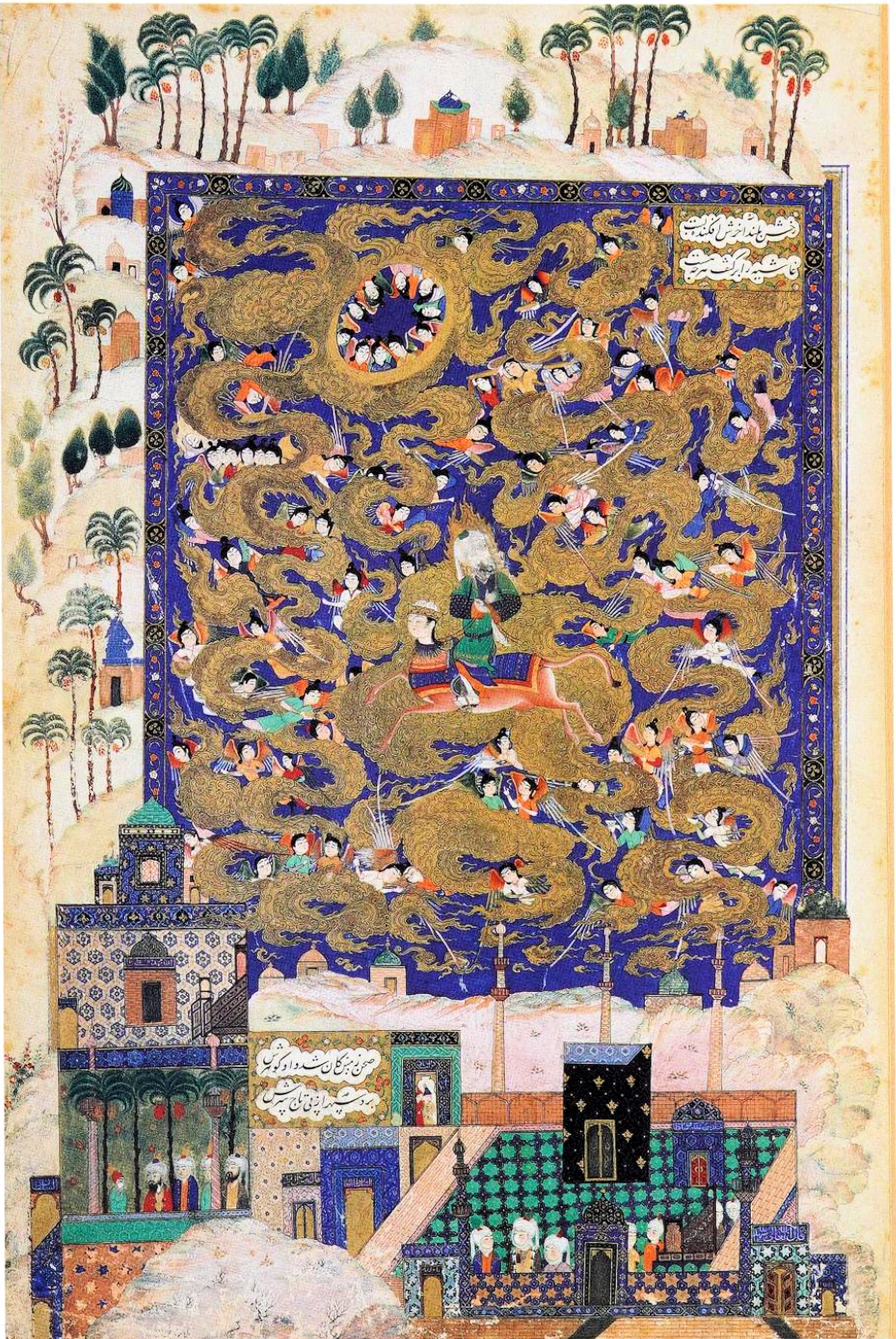
The Mir'aj of Prophet Muhammad, Khamsa of Nizami (Keir Collection). Tabriz, added under Shah Ismail circa 1505

Under the Safavids, the arts of the book, especially Persian miniature painting, constituted the essential driving force of the arts. The ketab khaneh, the royal library-workshop, provided most of the sources of motifs for objects such as carpets, ceramics or metal.

Various types of books were copied, illuminated, bound and sometimes illustrated: religious books – Korans, but also commentaries on the sacred text and theological works—and books of Persian literature – Shahnameh, Nizami's Khamsa, Jami al-Tawarikh by Rashid-al-Din Hamadani, Timur nāmeh—encyclopedias and scientific treatises of Sufism. Paper, a Chinese invention arriving early in Iran (13th century), was always used, sometimes coloured or flecked with goldleaf in the margins. Towards 1540, a marbled paper also appeared, which however rapidly disappeared again.

The bindings were mostly accomplished with tinted morocco leather of very fine quality. They could be gilded and stamped with geometric, floral or figurative motifs, or embossed in blue. In the second half of the 16th century, they pierced the leather covers to allow the coloured paper or silk pages to be seen. In the same period, at Shiraz, appeared lacquered bindings, which remain however very rare and highly valued in Iran.

The decoration of the margins was realised in various ways: sometimes they were inserted in a different paper, (a tradition that appeared in the 15th century); sprinkled with gold, following a Chinese custom; or painted with colours or gold. The style of illustrations varied greatly from one manuscript to another, according to the period and centre of production.

=== 1501–1550: Heritage ===
Three centres were active in this period, namely Tabriz, Shiraz and Bukhara. Tabriz, capital of the Safavid empire from 1501 to 1548, again also used artists of the Ak Koyunlu ketab khaneh (the royal library-workshop). The illustrations show a double heritage: that of the Ak Koyunlu and that of the Timurid dynasty. The latter benefitted from the taking of Herat in 1501, but did not really manifest itself until the year 1525. The various directors of the ketab khaneh are Sultan Muhammad (1515–1522), Bihzad (1522–1540) and Mir Musavvir.

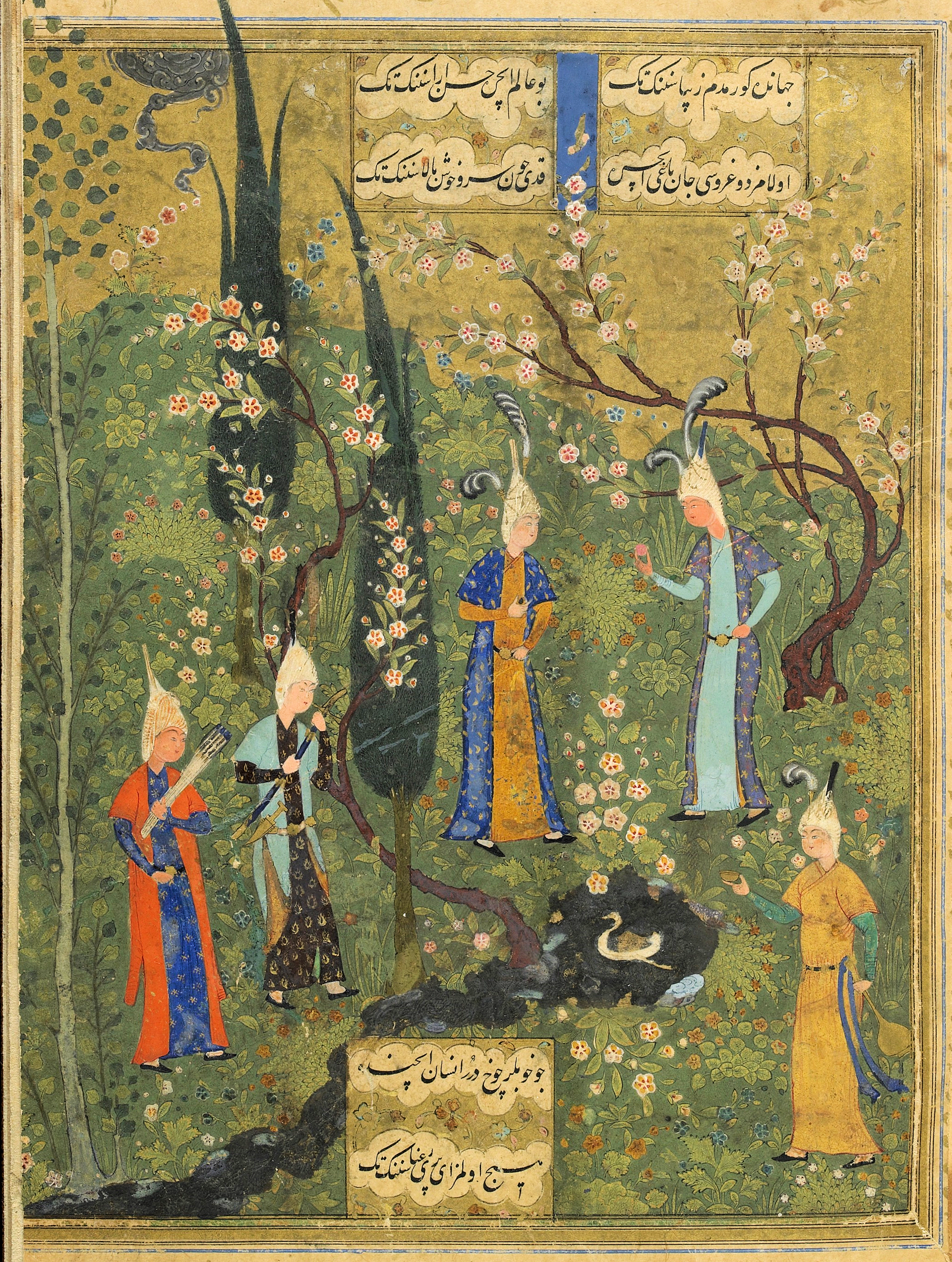
Dīvān of Khatā'ī (Collected Poems by Shah Isma’il), "Five youths in the garden". Tabriz. 1515-20s. Text in Turkish in black nasta’liq script: "I have never seen anyone so beautiful as you on the earth, never in this world anyone as gorgeous as you. Truly within the garden of the soul there can be no gesture so elegant as your tall erect cypress. Although there are many beauties among humanity, there is none, O Beauty, so radiant as you".

Many great painters, such as Aqa Mirak, Mir Sayyid Ali or Dust Muhammad worked in the book-workshop, and produced great royal manuscripts. The first of which we have some trace is the unfinished Tahmasp Shahnameh commissioned by Ismail for his son Tahmasp, including Raksh defends a sleeping Rustam. This last is undoubtedly one of the most famous pieces of Safavid painting, which shows the strong prominence of Turkmen art in the treatment of very dense vegetation, like a carpet, and in the messing up of perspective. It is thought that it was when Shah Tahmasp returned to Tabriz in 1522 that work on this painting stopped in 1522, when, moulded by the influence of his masters Behzād and Sultan Muhammad, he got work started on his great Shah Nameh. He also commissioned other exceptional works, including a Hamsa and a Iskandar Nameh. Other patrons employed artists of the royal ketab khaneh: prince Braham Mirza (1517–1549) had an album or muraqqa) made for him by the painter Dost Muhammad. The art of calligraphy was at that time dominated by a very prominent man, named "Zarrin Qalam", which means "golden reed pen", who excelled in the six canonical calligraphies.

The royal workshops of Tabriz were very influential, and the non-royal manuscripts, illuminated and illustrated, spread throughout the whole empire, distinguishing the provincial centres such as that of Shiraz.

Shiraz is the capital of Fars province and a very active provincial centre of the south of Iran. The artists were always the same as those employed by the Ak Koyunlu, and produced volumes in small formats, copies of the Qur'an and of grand poetic texts, destined for the most part for commerce with the Ottoman Empire (Syria, Egypt). In spite of the blockade imposed by this empire in 1512, the production did not weaken, which suggests that it turned towards other poorly-identified buyers, given the absence of local patronage. Under the influence of Tabriz, one notes the evolutions between 1501 and 1525: the silhouettes became slimmer; the taj, the characteristic Qizilbash headgear, started to appear, with a red baton and twelve folds corresponding to the twelve imams of the Twelver Shi`ism. From 1525 forward, the workshops of Shiraz produced nothing but copies of the works of the royal workshops of Tabriz, then of Qazvin and Isfahan.

Bukhara was not properly speaking a Safavid centre, given that the city was at the centre of an independent state led by the Uzbek dynasty Shaybanid from 1500 to 1598. But the nomadism of the artists, due to frequent political changes and to the nomadism of the sovereigns, implicated notable influence on the part of the Safavid centres. The manuscripts of this school are characterized by their margins richly decorated with the technique of encartage. Their bindings had a counter-plate with a large decoration of perforated leather and a plate with large rectangular plaques with animal motifs or arabesques, according to the ancient Timurid tradition. The painting used a harmonious palette, with airy compositions, but an absence of new models and the repetition of poncifs (pointillism?) creates a certain aridity.

The school of Bukhara reached its peak between 1530 and 1550, and directly influenced Mughal art.

=== 1550–1600: Transition period ===
The years 1550–1600 were marked by numerous changes in the organization of the empire and therefore in the production of books among the Safavids. With the transfer of capital in 1548, the royal workshop moved, and it was Qazvin which took over the royal production. In any case, the provincial centres such as that of Shiraz (in the south) or Khorasan (in the east of Iran) continued to produce manuscripts, more or less rich.

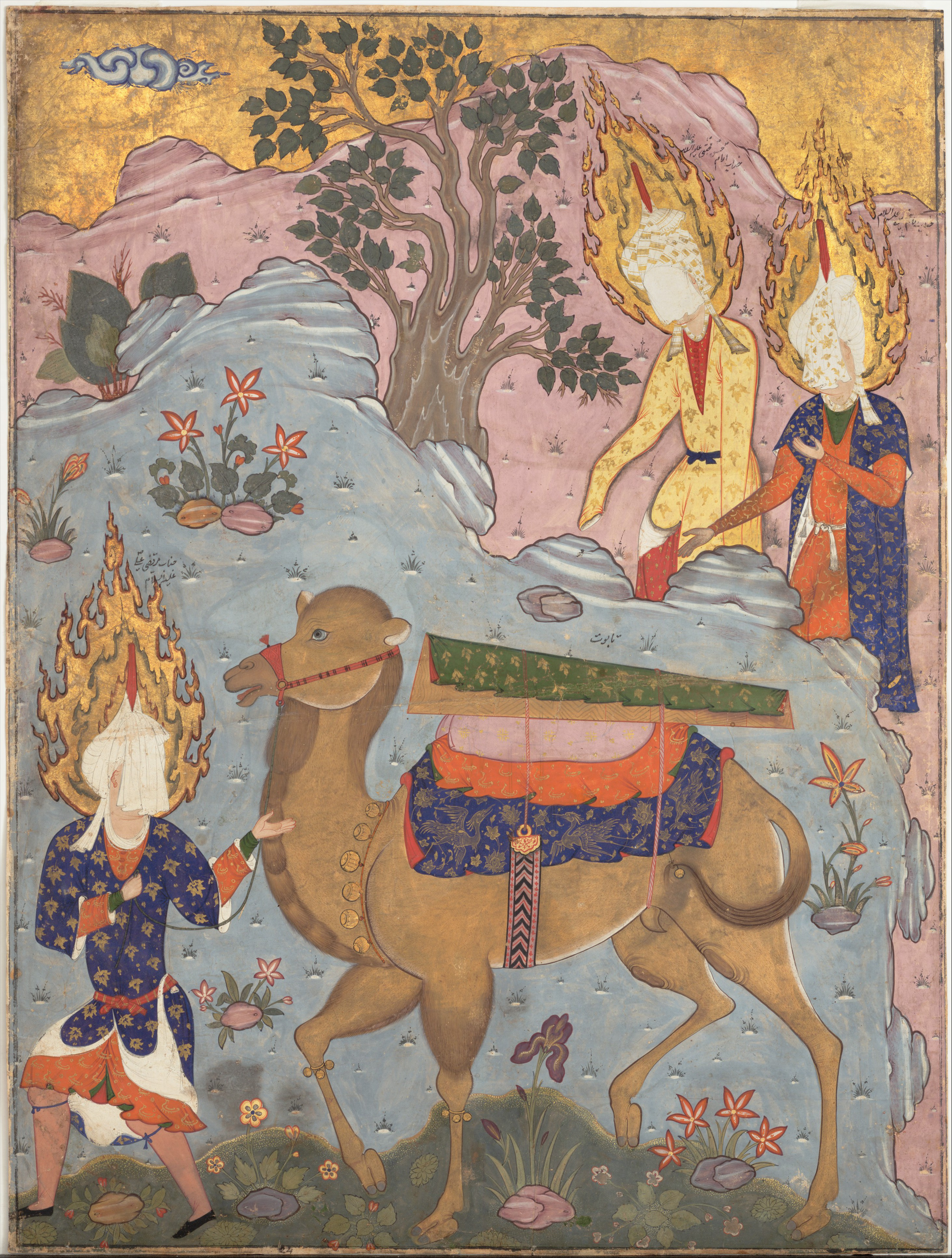
"Coffin of Imam 'Ali", Folio from a Falnama (The Book of Omens) of Ja'far al-Sadiq, circa 1560.

With the transfer of the capital from Tabriz to Qazvin in 1548, the khetab khaneh was in large part dismantled, following edicts of repentance published by the Shah for religious and economic reasons. The artists fled to provincial or foreign courts (Mughal or Ottoman). Only Aqa Mirak resisted this series of departures. Other artists, such as Siavush Beg the Georgian or Sadiqi Beg took the place of the preceding generation. New grand calligraphers, Mir Ali ou Malik Dayalami appeared and gave birth to the "rule of the two quills", which defined identical rules for calligraphy and painting. Illumination and bookbinding evolved in parallel from the art of tapestry, given that the templates used were identical. In manuscripts, most often the paintings were double pages with no connection with the text, but images of servers of drinks, young women, princes, and dervishes filled the albums (muraqqa).

If the end of the reign of Shah Tahmasp was not very fruitful, (we know, however, of a Fāl Nāmeh dating from these years with the signatures of Aqa Mirak et Abd al-Aziz), Shah Ismail II (1576–77) exercised a beneficial influence, ordering a grand Shah Nāmeh and an Ajayibnāmeh (book of wonders). Unfortunately, his short reign prevented a real renaissance, even if it did establish new foundations, marking the beginning of the proliferation of pages of albums. His successor, Shah Mohammed Khodabanda, being blind, took little interest in books, ending the restart which had been set in motion. The renewal of the art of the royal book would only take place partially under Saha Abbas I the Grand, who ordered, as, it seemed, was the custom, a grand Shah Nāmeh on transferring the court to Isfahan.

The provincial workshop of Shiraz continued to flourish until 1620, but continued most often to recopy the models issued by the royal workshops of Tabriz, then of Qazvin and Khorasan. The ornamentation was bountiful, illustration was abundant in manuscripts and the colours were vibrant, although without much variation. The drawings represented people with round faces and long noses. The illumination remained very repetitive, and the calligraphy, most often nastaliq, was copied from one to another. Most of the manuscripts were not signed.

The workshops said to be of Khorasan were situated in Herat in the district of Bakharz. Under the patronage of the brother of Braham Mirza, Ibrahim Mirza, they revitalized the school of Qazvin, employing artists such as Shaykh Muhammad, Muzaffar Ali or Muhammadi, specialized in drawings. The most famous manuscript that came out of these workshops is a copy of the Haft Awrang (Seven Thrones) of Jami, and is marked by the profound originality of the creations of the official workshops.

=== 1600–1660: Decline of illuminated manuscripts ===
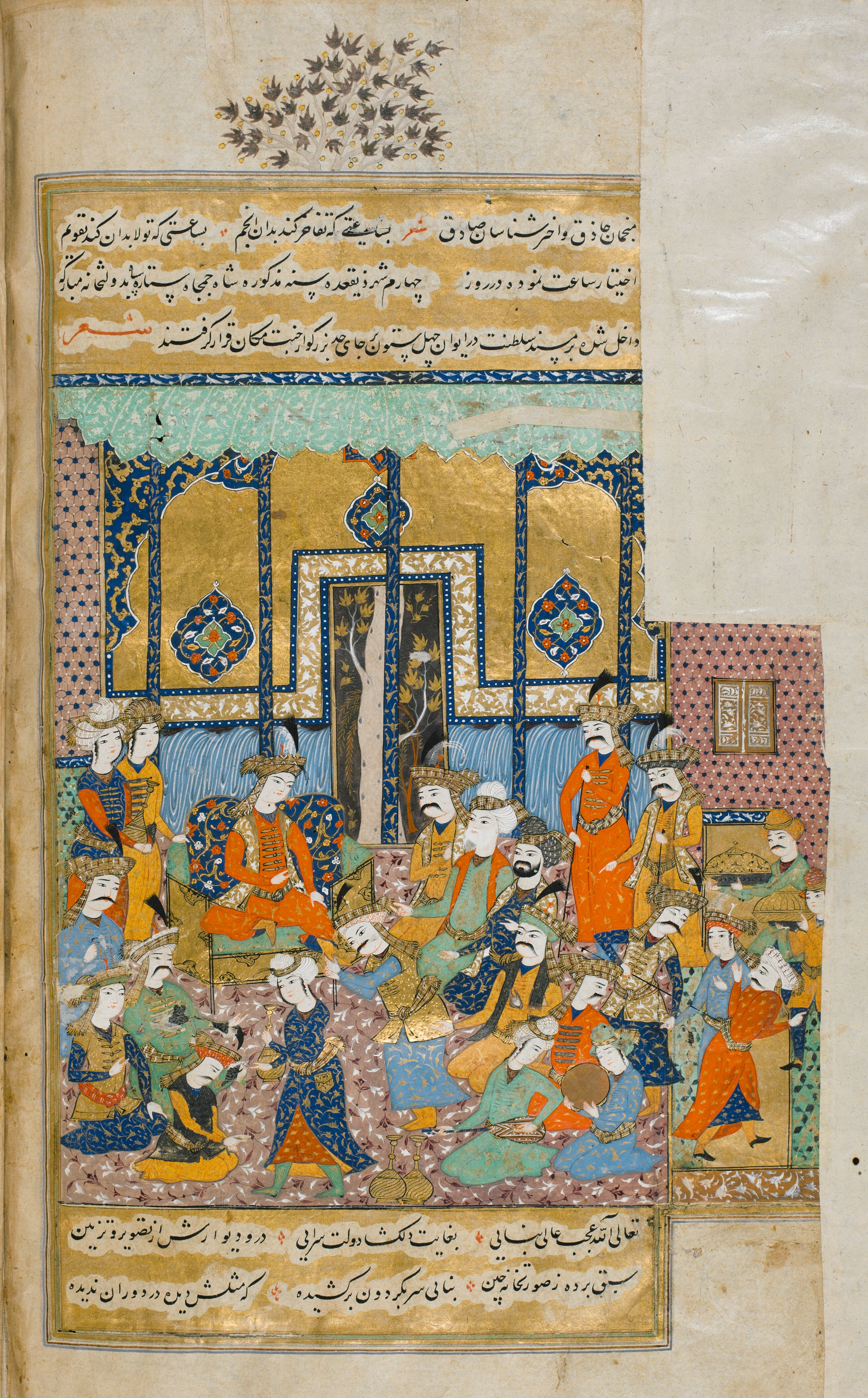
Accession of Shah ʽAbbās I to the throne in Qazvin. Qāḍī Aḥmad Qummī's Ḫulāṣat at-tawārīḫ, 1695

During the reigns of Shah Abbas I and Shah Safi, the number of illuminated and illustrated manuscripts dropped considerably, leaving mostly single works intended as album pages. The albums were created most often under the direction of a painter or calligrapher. They grouped together drawings, calligraphy and also ancient miniatures. Reza Abbasi, who directed the kitab khaneh between 1597 and 1635, (having been transferred, in 1602, to Isfahan), is undoubtedly the greatest representative of this genre. The people illustrated on these album pages are most often elongated silhouettes, with little rounded heads. The subjects could be courtesans, servers of drinks being prominent, but also peasants and dervishes. Although Reza resisted European influence, right up to his death in 1635, other artists did not hesitate to draw inspiration from, or to copy, the engravings brought by merchants from the Netherlands. Other great painters of albums from this period were Safi Abassi, son of Reza, known for his paintings of birds, and Mo’in Musavvir, Muhammad Qasim and Muhammad Ali, his disciples.

This taste for the album did not entirely put a permanent end to book illustrations. The Shah Nāmeh for Shah Abbas, the two Divan of Nismai or again the manuscript of Khosrow and Shirin (1632, Victoria and Albert Museum) are examples of the perpetuation of this tradition, which the provincial workshops abandoned less readily than the royal ketab khaneh. The school of Herst, notably, still regularly produces copies of great illustrated Persian texts.

=== 1660–1722: The end of illustrated manuscripts ===
With the emergence of Ali Qoli Djebbeh Dar and Muhammad Zaman, two very Europeanistic painters, the role of the illustrated book in the art of the book declined still further. A significant activity of calligraphy and illumination was put into practice, with a true regrowth of interest for the former and an abundant style, very fine and rich in plant elements for the second.

== Legacy ==
The Safavids were the last sovereigns to promote a Persian national art. Thanks to them, in present-day Iran a new art is taking flight, particularly notable in urbanism: Ali Qapu, Chehel Sutun have their treasure-troves in verdant parks laid out according to precise perspectives, such as the monumental boulevard of Tchehar Bagh (or avenue of the four gardens) which crosses the city of Isfahan in a 3-kilometre stretch. Guardians of the ancient Iranian artistic tradition more than innovators, they carry out a refined and sumptuous art of the court, with an affected manner filled with great poetic charm. Their fall led to a rapid degeneration of art in Iran.

== See also ==
- Qajar art
- Safavid architecture
