= Durmish Khan Shamlu =

Qizilbash officer (died 1525)

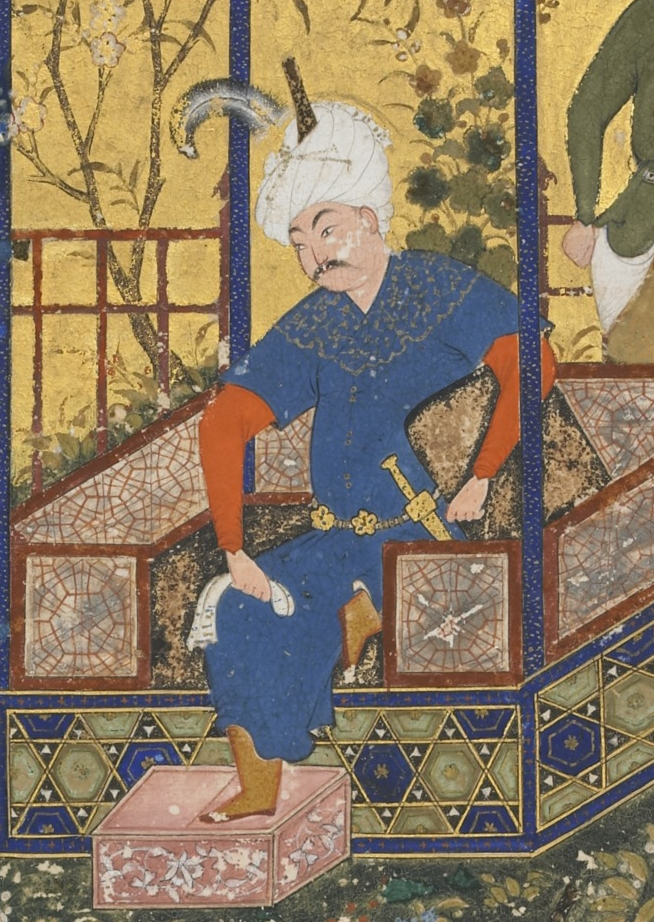
- Durmish Khan (enthroned). Divan by Hafiz. Feast of 'id. Painted by Shaykhzada, 1524–1525, Herat (Freer F1932.51)

Governor of Isfahan
- In office 1503–?
- Monarchs: Ismail I Tahmasp I
- Deputy: Mirza Shah Hossein

Governor of Herat
- In office 1521–1525
- Monarchs: Ismail I Tahmasp I
- Preceded by: Amir Khan Mawsillu
- Succeeded by: Hoseyn Khan Shamlu

Personal details
- Died: 1525
- Parent: Abdi Beg Shamlu (father)
- Relatives: Hoseyn Khan Shamlu (brother)
- Tribe: Shamlu

Military service
- Allegiance: Safavid Iran
- Battles/wars: Battle of Chaldiran

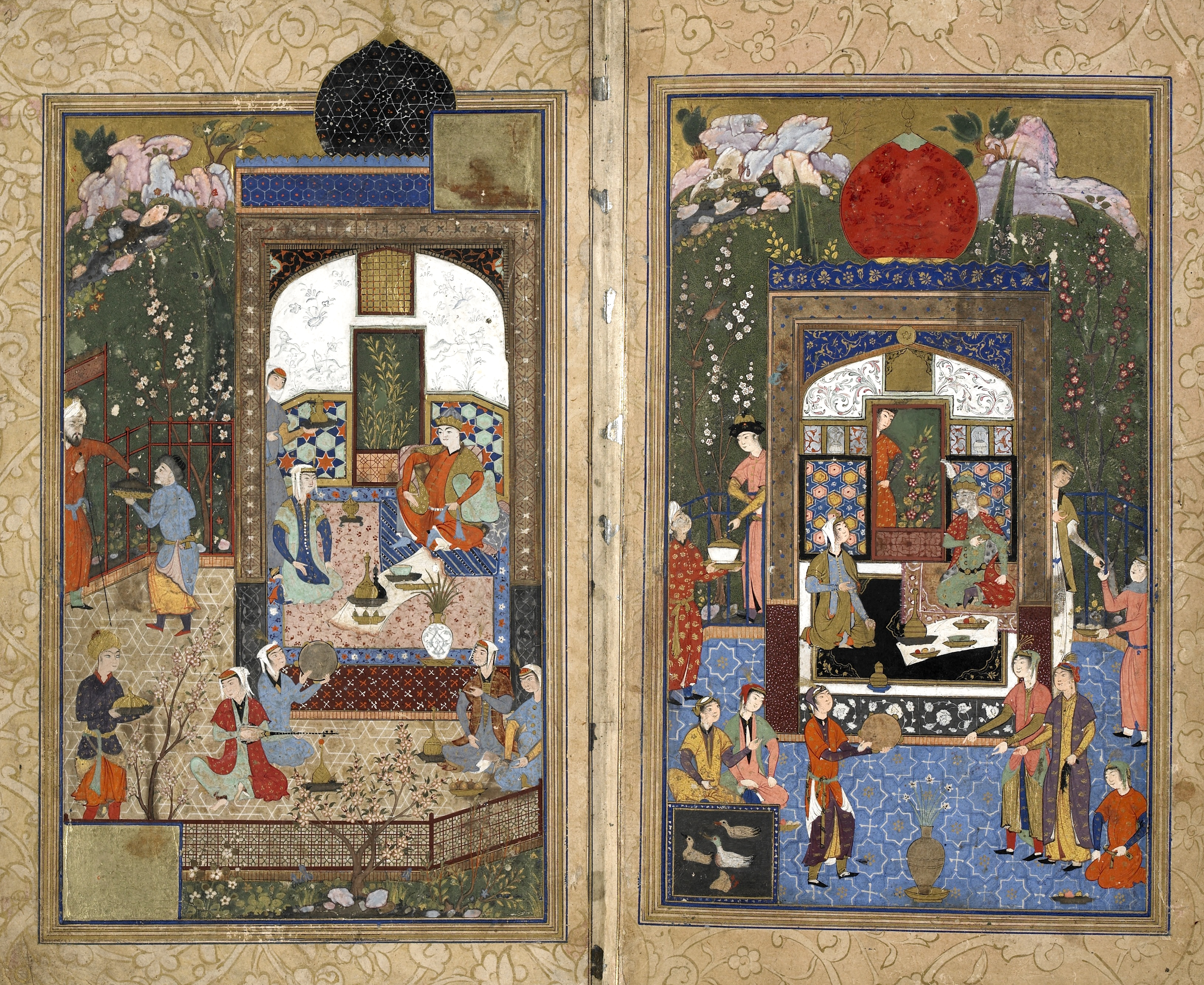
Lawa'ih (Effulgences of light) by Jami (d.1492). Copy commissioned by Durmish Khan Shamlu (d. 1525), ca.1521–1525 in Herat.

Durmish (Dormish) Khan Shamlu (Persian: دورمیش‌خان شاملو; died 1525) was a Qizilbash officer of Turkoman Shamlu ethnicity, who occupied high offices under Shah Ismail I (r. 1501–1524), the founder of the Safavid dynasty, and his son Shah Tahmasp I (r. 1524–1576).

== Biography ==
Durmish Khan was the son of Abdi Beg Shamlu, while his mother was a sister of shah Ismail I. Furthermore, Durmish Khan had a brother named Hoseyn Khan Shamlu. In 1503, Durmish Khan was appointed as the governor of Isfahan, but chose to stay in the Safavid capital of Tabriz and appointed Mirza Shah Hossein as his vizier. Durmish Khan commissioned and funded Mirza Shah Hossein Isfahani, the greatest architect of the period, to build in particular the Mausoleum of Harun-e Vilayat in 1512–1513, and the Ali Mosque (1522), the only mosque built in Iran in the first half of the 16th century. Under Durmish Khan's patronage, Fakhri Heravi translated Ali-Shir Nava'i's Chagatai Turkic text, Majalis al-Nafais, a biographical account of Turkic and Persian poets and scholars, into Persian under the title Lata'ef-nama in 1524.

In 1514, while the Safavid forces were at Chaldiran and planning on how to confront the Ottomans, who had declared war against the Safavid Empire. Mohammad Khan Ustajlu, who served as the governor of Diyarbakır, and Nur-Ali Khalifa, a commander who knew how the Ottomans fought, proposed that they should attack as quickly as possible. However, this proposal was rejected by Durmish Khan, who rudely said that Muhammad Khan Ustajlu was only interested in the province which he governed. The proposal was also rejected by Ismail himself, who said; "I am not a caravan-thief, whatever is decreed by God, will occur." A battle shortly ensued, which, however, resulted in an absolute disaster for the Safavids, who lost most of their troops and commanders.

In 1518/9, Durmish Khan suppressed several rebellions in Mazandaran, and later in 1520 he was sent to Baghdad to defend the city against the Ottoman sultan Selim I, who, however, died of sickness before he managed to reach the city. In 1521, Mirza Shah Hossein, who now served as Ismail's vizier and had become so powerful that he chose to send Durmish Khan far away from the Safavid court—to Herat in Khorasan, where he was forced to serve as its governor. When Durmish Khan arrived to the city, he appointed Ahmad Sultan Afshar as the governor of several districts of the province. In May 1522, the Mughal ruler Babur seized Qandahar from Durmish Khan. In 1523/4, Herat was attacked a by a group of Uzbeks, which Durmish Khan managed to repel.

Durmish Khan later died in 1525 and was succeeded by his brother Hoseyn Khan Shamlu.

== Sources ==
- Babaie, Sussan (2003). "Building on the Past: the Shaping of Safavid Architecture, 1501-76". Hunt for paradise: court arts of Safavid Iran 1501-1576. New York Milano: Asia Society Museum; Skira. ISBN 978-8884915900.
- Savory, Roger (2007). Iran under the Safavids. Cambridge University Press. pp. 1–288. ISBN 978-0521042512.
- Blow, David (2009). Shah Abbas: The Ruthless King Who became an Iranian Legend. London, UK: I. B. Tauris & Co. Ltd. ISBN 978-1-84511-989-8. LCCN 2009464064.
- Matthee, Rudi (2011). Persia in Crisis: Safavid Decline and the Fall of Isfahan. I.B.Tauris. pp. 1–371. ISBN 978-0857731814.
- National Museum of Asian Art (2025). "Lawa'ih (Effulgences of light) by Jami (d.1492)". National Museum of Asian Art.
- Babaie, Sussan (2004). Slaves of the Shah: New Elites of Safavid Iran. I.B.Tauris. pp. 1–218. ISBN 9781860647215.
- Newman, Andrew J. (2008). Safavid Iran: Rebirth of a Persian Empire. I.B.Tauris. pp. 1–281. ISBN 9780857716613.
- Qasemi, Sharif Husain (1999). "Faḵrī Heravī, Solṭān-Moḥammad". In Yarshater, Ehsan (ed.). Encyclopædia Iranica (Online ed.). Encyclopædia Iranica Foundation. ISBN 978-0933273351.
- Roemer, H.R. (1986). "The Safavid period". The Cambridge History of Iran, Volume 5: The Timurid and Safavid periods. Cambridge: Cambridge University Press. pp. 189–351. ISBN 9780521200943.
- Savory, R. M. (1984). "AḤMAD SOLṬĀN AFŠĀR". Encyclopaedia Iranica, Vol. I, Fasc. 6. p. 661.

Unknown	Governor of Isfahan; 1503 – ?	Unknown
Preceded by Amir Khan Mawsillu	Governor of Herat; 1521 – 1525	Succeeded by Husayn Khan Shamlu
