= Shaykh Zadeh =

16th-century Iranian painter

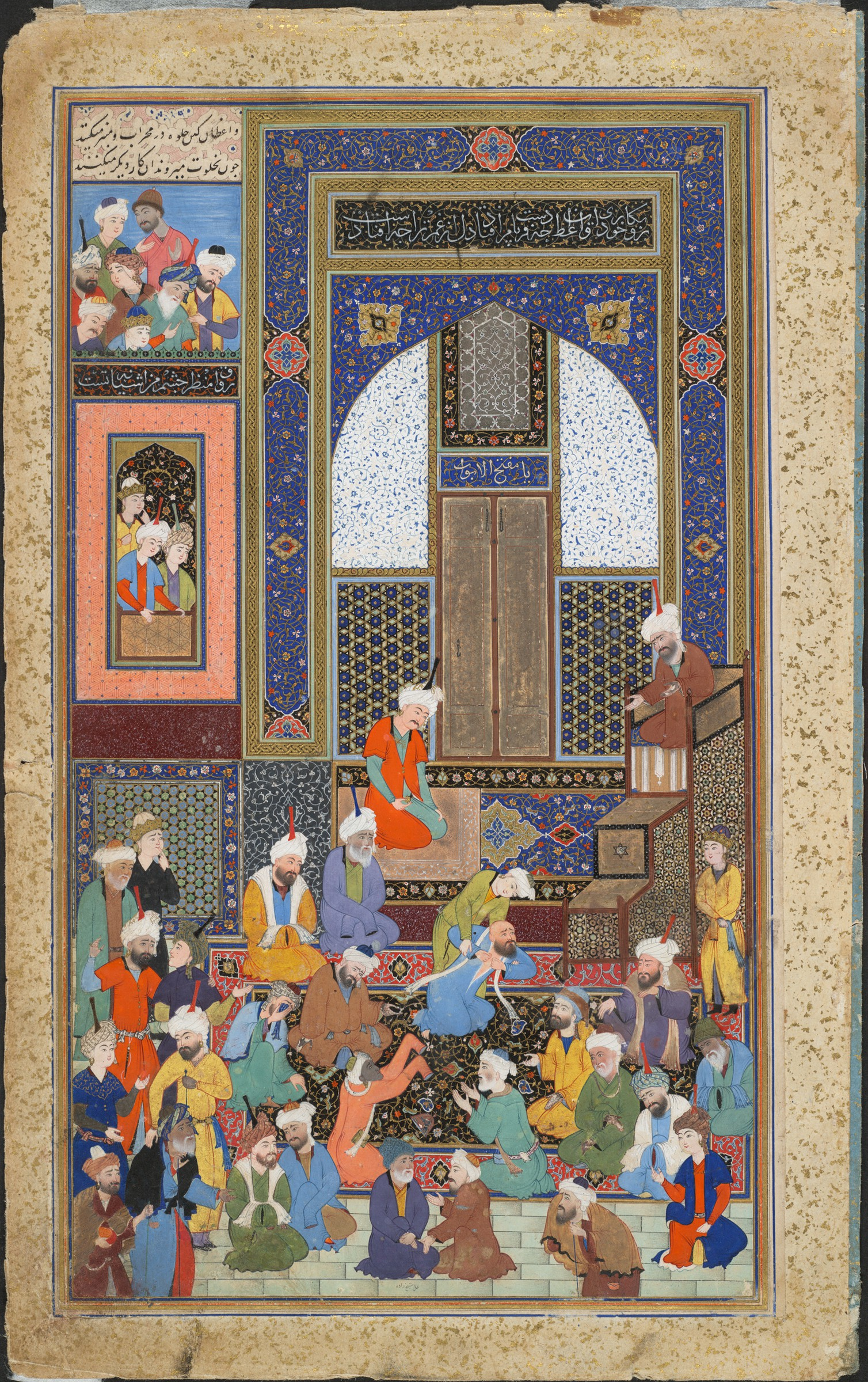
Sermon in a mosque. The central repentant appears to be Husayn Khan Shamlu. Cartier Hafiz.

Shaykh Zadeh was a 16th-century miniaturist in Safavid Herat. In particular, he worked on the Cartier Hafiz, a copy of the Diwan of Hafiz by the 14th century poet Hafez.

== Works ==
Shaykh Zadeh worked from Herat, and often collaborated with Sultan Muhammad in Tabriz, the two probably communicating by courrier. In the late 1520s, Shaykh Zadeh made two of the miniatures of the Cartier Hafiz, the Sermon in a mosque, which he signed with a small graffito, and the now-lost polo scene. Shaykh Zadeh's patron, the Herat potentate Husayn Khan Shamlu, is probably depicted in these two miniatures as a mature man with a full mustache.

Feeling underappreciated, Shaykh Zadeh left Herat for the Khanate of Bukhara.

== Other miniatures ==
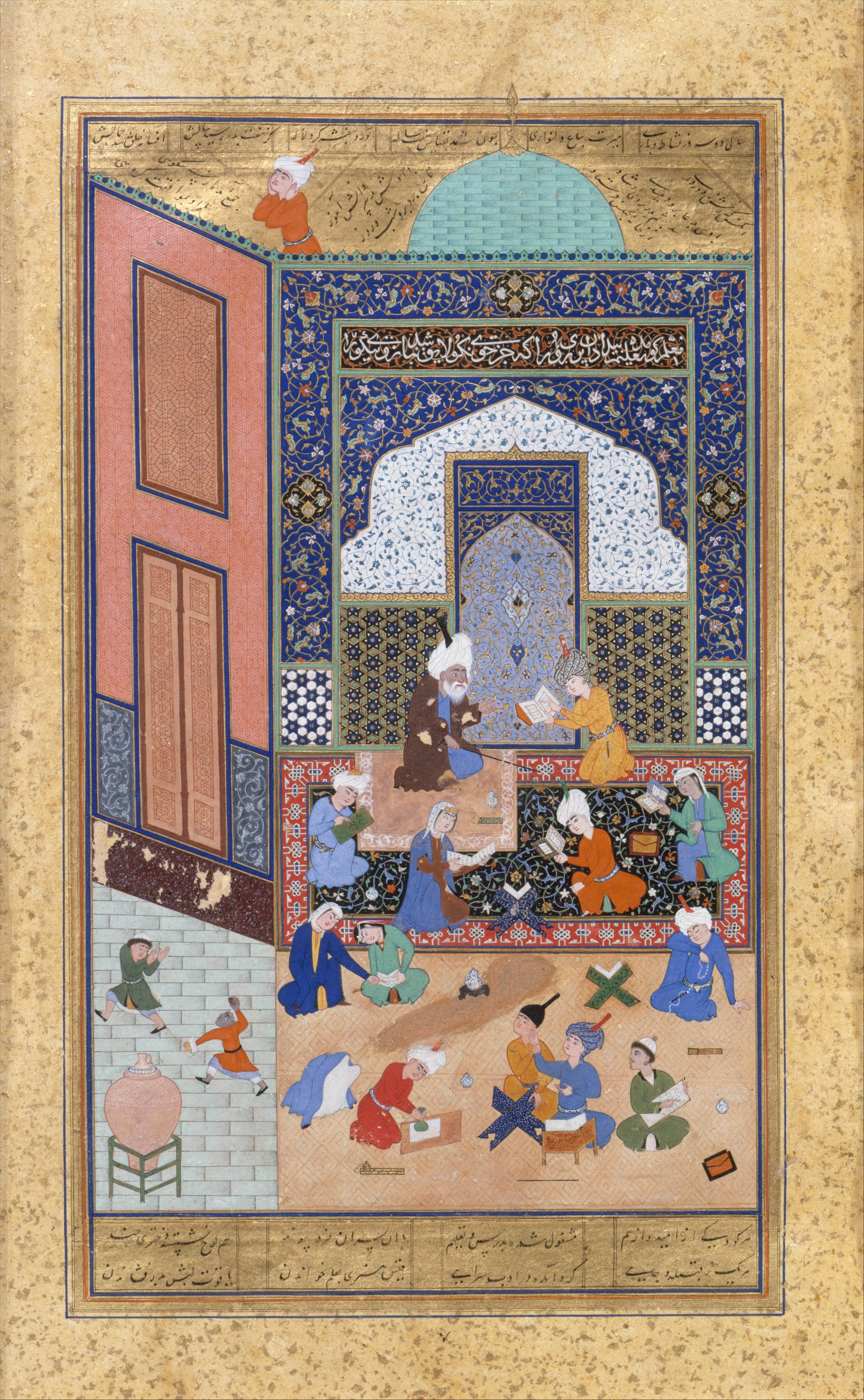
Laila and Majnun in School, Khamsa, Herat, 1524/1525 (MET 13.228.7)

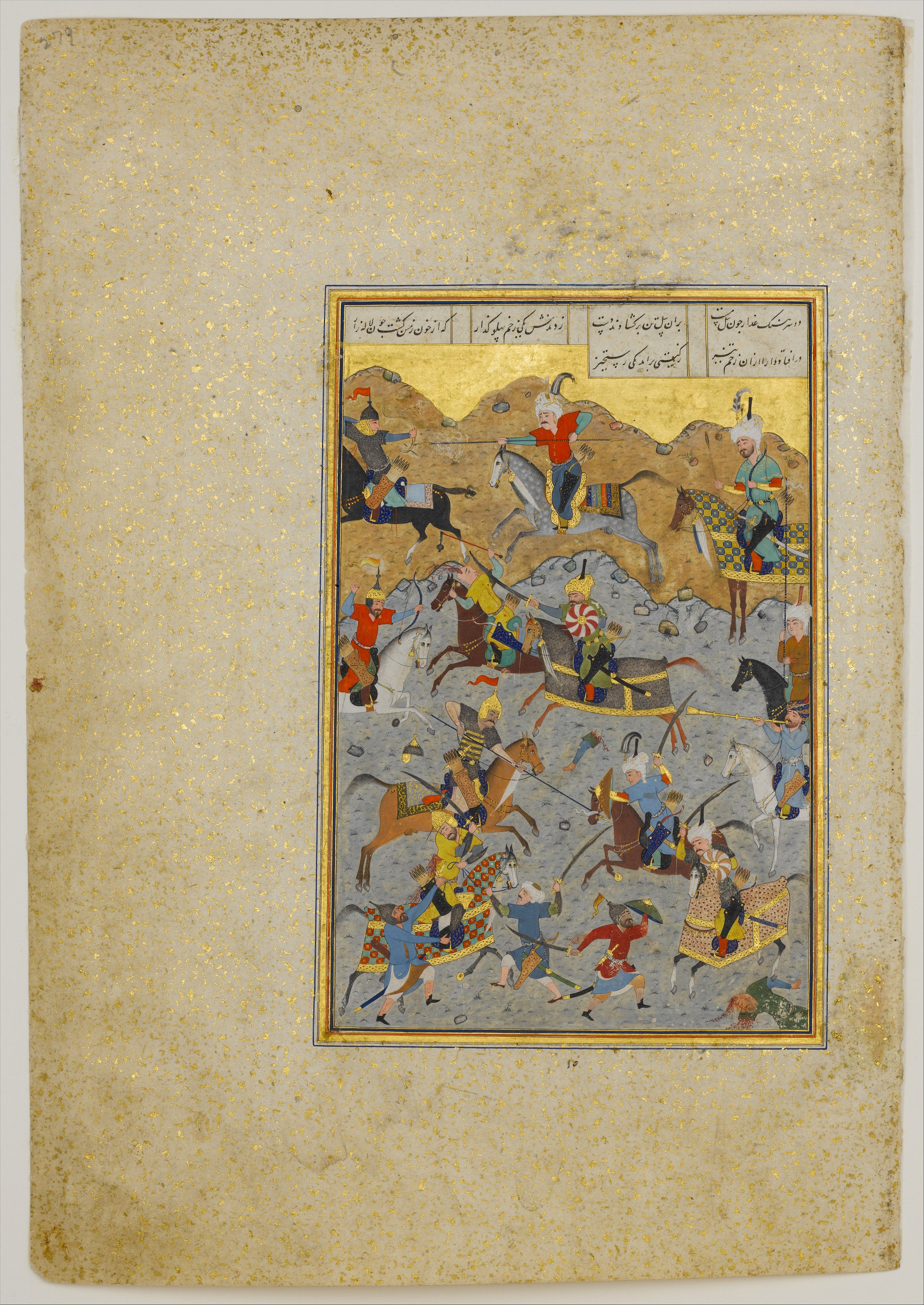
"Battle between Alexander and Darius", Khamsa, Herat, 1524/1525 (MET 13.228.7)

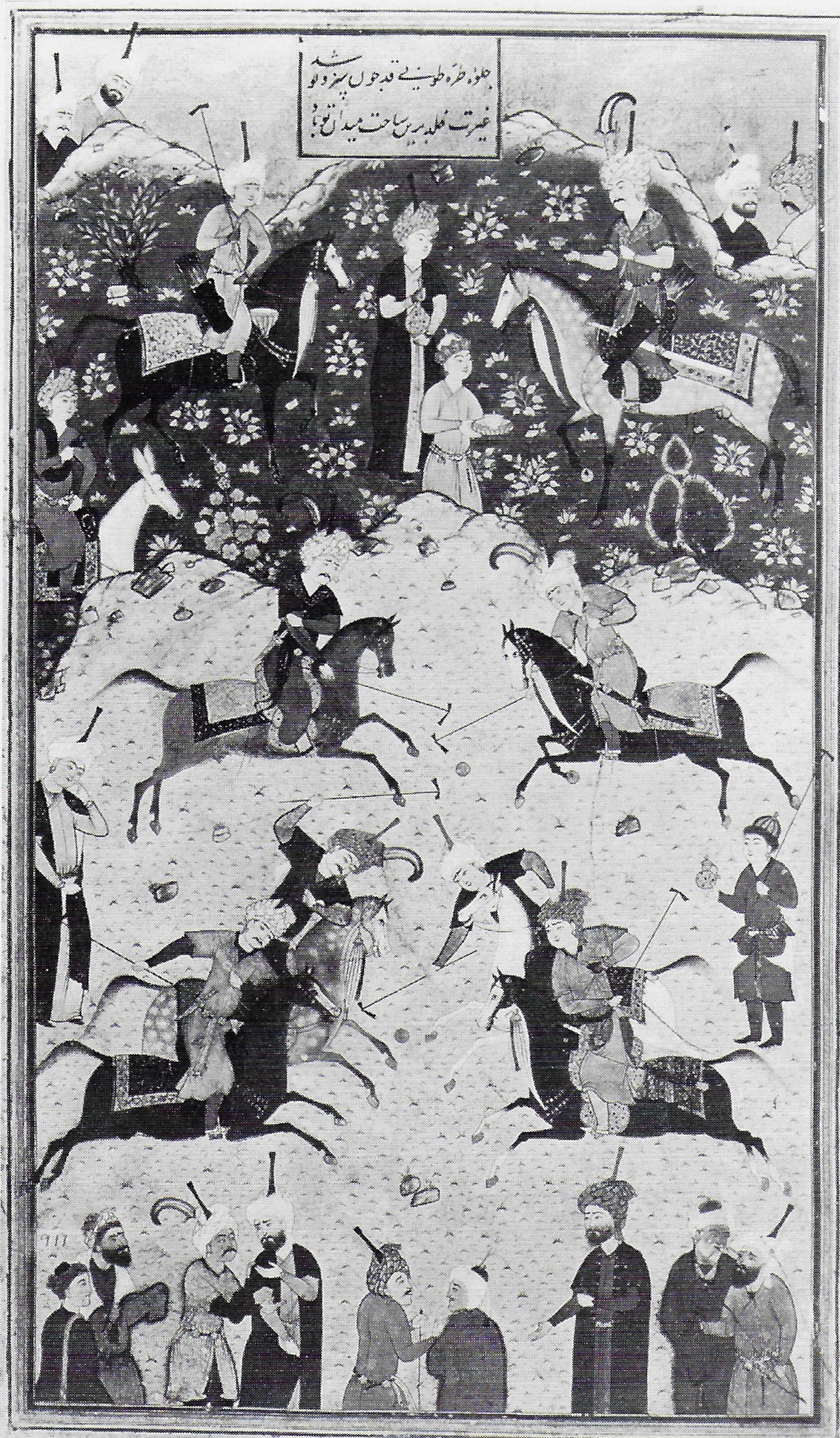
Polo scene (lost), Cartier Hafiz, 1531

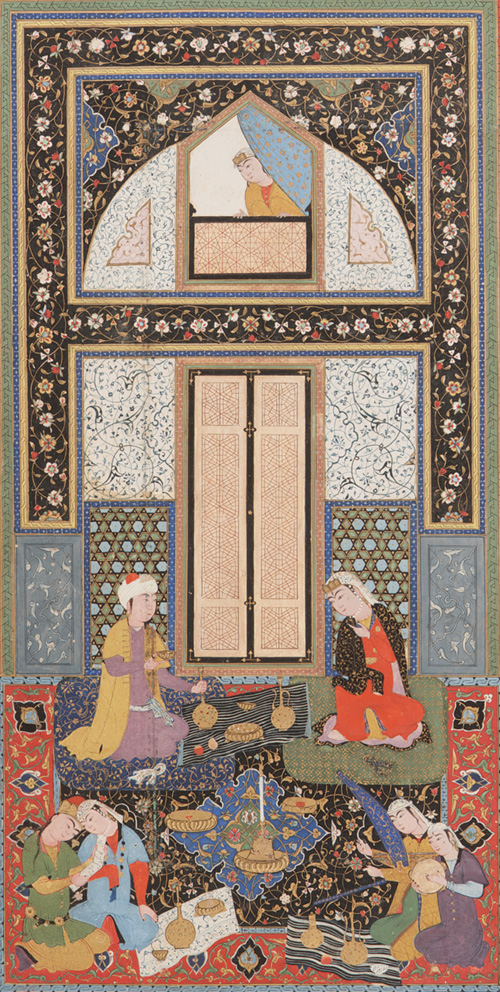
Bahram Gur and the Princess in the Black Pavilion, 1538, Bukhara

== Sources ==
- Blair, Sheila (2014). Text and image in medieval Persian art. Edinburgh: Edinburgh University Press. ISBN 978-0748655786.
- Gray (1961). La Peinture Persane.
- Soudavar, Abolala (1992). Art of the Persian courts : selections from the Art and History Trust Collection. New York: Rizzoli. ISBN 978-0-8478-1660-6.
- Soucek, Priscilla (1990). "Sultan Muhammad Tabrizi: Painter at the Safavid Court". Persian masters: five centuries of paintings. Bombay: Marg Publications. pp. 55–58. ISBN 978-8185026107.
- Soucek, Priscilla (2003). "Interpreting the Ghazals of Hafiz". Res: Anthropology and Aesthetics. 43: 146–163. doi:10.1086/RESv43n1ms20167595. ISSN 0277-1322.
- Welch, Stuart Cary (1976). Persian painting: five royal Safavid manuscripts of the sixteenth century. New York : G. Braziller. ISBN 978-0-8076-0812-8.
