= Sam Mirza =

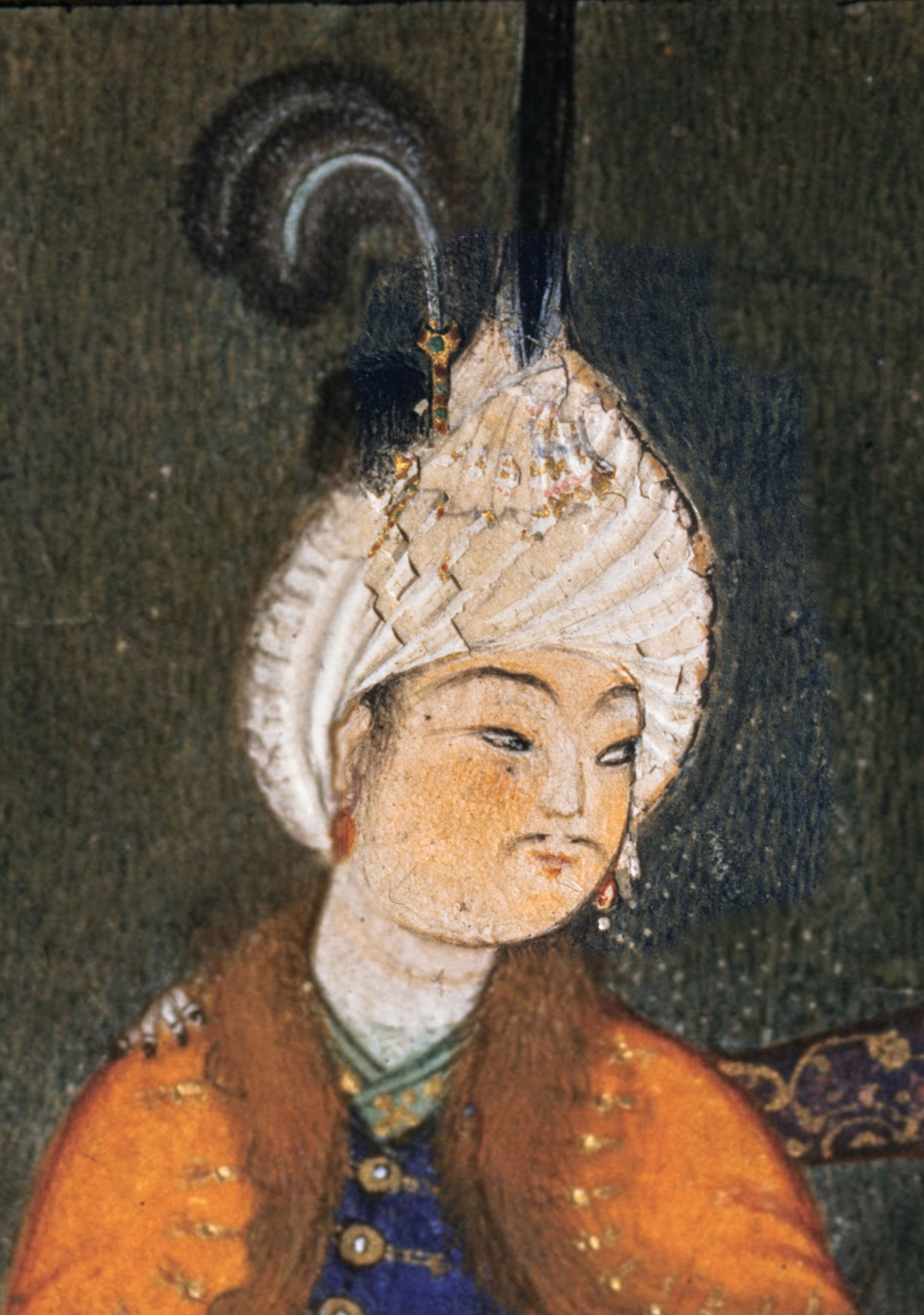
- Contemporary portrait of Sam Mirza, in the Cartier Hafiz, dated c. 1533.

Governor of Herat
- 1st tenure: 1521–1530
- Predecessor: Ebrahim Soltan Khan Mowsellu
- Successor: Bahram Mirza Safavi
- Lala: Durmish Khan Shamlu; Hoseyn Khan Shamlu
- 2nd tenure: 1533–1536
- Predecessor: Bahram Mirza Safavi
- Successor: Khalifeh Soltan Shamlu
- Lala: Aghzivar Khan Shamlu
- Born: 1517; Iran
- Died: 1566/67 (aged 49 or 50); Qahqaheh Castle, Iran
- Spouse: Daughter of Hoseyn Khan Shamlu
- Issue: Rostam Mirza; Unnamed daughter
- Dynasty: Safavid
- Father: Ismail I
- Mother: Unnamed Georgian woman
- Religion: Twelver Shia Islam
- Writing career
- Language: Persian
- Notable works: Tohfa-ye Sami

Sam Mirza (Persian: سام میرزا; 1517 – 1566/67) was a Safavid prince and poet in 16th-century Iran, who wrote the Tohfa-ye Sami ("Gift of Sam"), a collection of biographies of contemporary Persian poets. He was the third son of Shah Ismail I (r. 1501–1524), the founder of the Safavid dynasty.

Sam Mirza was appointed governor of Herat (in present-day Afghanistan) during his early years, following the tradition of educating Safavid princes by assigning them governorships under the supervision of experienced amir of the Qizilbash. During his time in Herat, he witnessed the remnants of the zenith of Persian culture from the reign of the Timurid ruler Sultan Husayn Bayqara (r. 1469–1506), but also became entangled in the political struggles of his Qizilbash guardians.

After an unsuccessful military campaign against the Mughal city of Kandahar in 1534, which resulted in significant losses and the fall of Herat to the Uzbeks from the Khanate of Bukhara, Sam Mirza's political career was effectively ended, despite his attempts to apologize to his suzerain and brother Shah Tahmasp I (r. 1524–1576). Although he was sidelined from political affairs, he remained a respected figure at court, and it was during this time that he wrote the Tohfa-ye Sami. The work reflects his deep engagement with Persian literature and his desire to highlight the role of poetry across various social classes and locations. He also composed a divan (collection of poems), of which only a few verses have survived.

In 1561/62, he was imprisoned in Qahqaheh Castle for an alleged political conspiracy and died there during an earthquake in 1566/67. He was survived by his daughter, who was married to Isa Khan Gorji.

== Background ==
Sam Mirza was born in 1517. He was the third son of Shah Ismail I (r. 1501–1524), the founder of the Safavid dynasty of Iran. His mother was a Georgian woman, who was likely also the mother of his brother Alqas Mirza. The two other brothers Shah Tahmasp I (r. 1524–1576) and Bahram Mirza Safavi had another mother. Due to Ismail I's fondness of Iranian national legends, Sam Mirza was named after the mythical Sam, who appears in the Persian epic Shahnameh and is a key figure at the court of Manuchehr as well as an ancestor of Rostam. Sam Mirza's tutor was Mohammad Mo'men, the son of the prominent scholar and poet Abdollah Morvarid.

== Career ==
The tradition of educating the princes of the reigning dynasty for handling government functions from an early age was continued by Ismail I and his eldest son and successor Tahmasp I. They did this by giving them the governorship of a province under the supervision of a guardian (lala), which was an experienced amir of the Qizilbash, who were Turkoman warriors and the main force of the Safavid military.

The governorship of Herat (in present-day Afghanistan) was given to Sam Mirza, succeeding Ebrahim Soltan Khan Mowsellu. Like other figures such as Tahmasp I and Bahram Mirza, it was most likely during his governorship of Herat that Sam Mirza learned about art and literature and developed his own artistic preferences. Sam Mirza's governance included terms under Durmish Khan Shamlu between 1521–1526 and Hoseyn Khan Shamlu between 1526–1530, until he was briefly replaced by Bahram Mirza and his guardian Ghazi Khan Takkalu between 1530–1533. From 1533 to 1536, Sam Mirza held the governorship of Herat again, with Aghzivar Khan Shamlu as his guardian. All three guardians of Sam Mirza were members of the Shamlu tribe. During his time in Herat, Sam Mirza experienced the remnants of the zenith of Persian culture under the Timurid ruler Sultan Husayn Bayqara (r. 1469–1506) and was involved in the power struggle of his guardians. Hoseyn Khan Shamlu is allegedly said to have backed him as a contender for the throne against Tahmasp I.

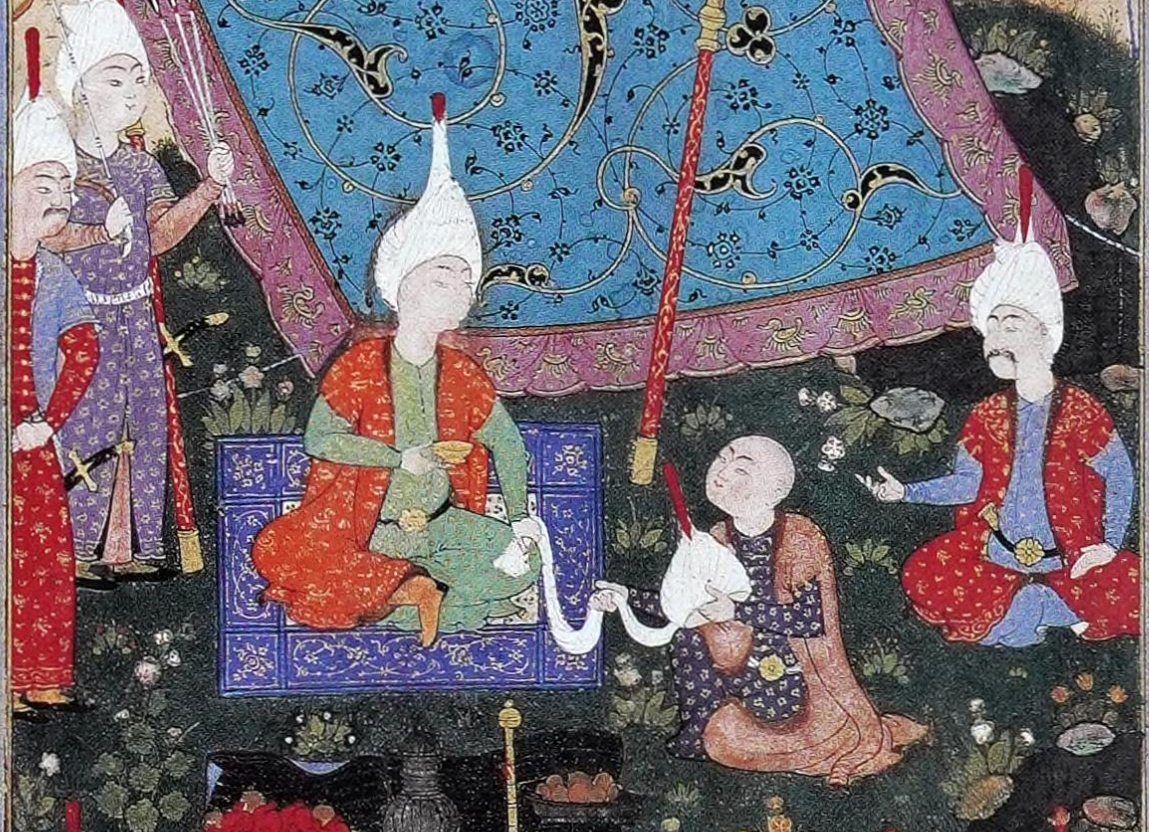
Sam Mirza (kneeling) receiving a Qizilbash turban from his brother and suzerain Shah Tahmasp I, dated c. 1531.

Following the murder of Hoseyn Khan Shamlu in 1534, Sam Mirza was persuaded into disobedience and took advantage of the Qizilbash troops that were assigned to him to protect Herat against the Uzbeks from the Khanate of Bukhara. Ignoring the shah's instructions, he sent them on an unsuccessful expedition against the Mughal city of Kandahar, which resulted in the death of many of the Qizilbash troops, including Aghzivar Khan Shamlu. Sam Mirza, forced to flee through Sistan to Tabas, left Herat vulnerable, allowing the Uzbeks to seize control and subject the city to fourteen months of brutal rule. Khalifeh Soltan Shamlu was appointed as the temporary governor of Herat. By 1537, order had returned to Herat as a result of Tahmasp I's direct intervention. Even though Sam Mirza apologized, this event ruined his political career.

Sam Mirza continued to be a respected figure in the royal court, despite not playing an important role. Resembling an ancient Persian knight, he outperformed in the chivalrous art of hunar numudan during the state visit by the Mughal emperor Humayun in 1544. Reportedly firmly attached to his literary goals, Sam Mirza began work on his Tohfa-ye Sami ("Gift of Sam") from at least 1550, finishing in 1560/61 at the latest. The scribe and historian Ahmad Ghaffari Qazvini worked under Sam Mirza during his period, composing the universal history Tarikh-e negarestan in 1552.

In 1561/62, Sam Mirza faced allegations of political plotting and was imprisoned with the two sons of Alqas Mirza (who had previously rebelled) at the fortress of Qahqaheh Castle, a site known for holding political prisoners. He died there from an earthquake in 1566/67.

== Literary work ==
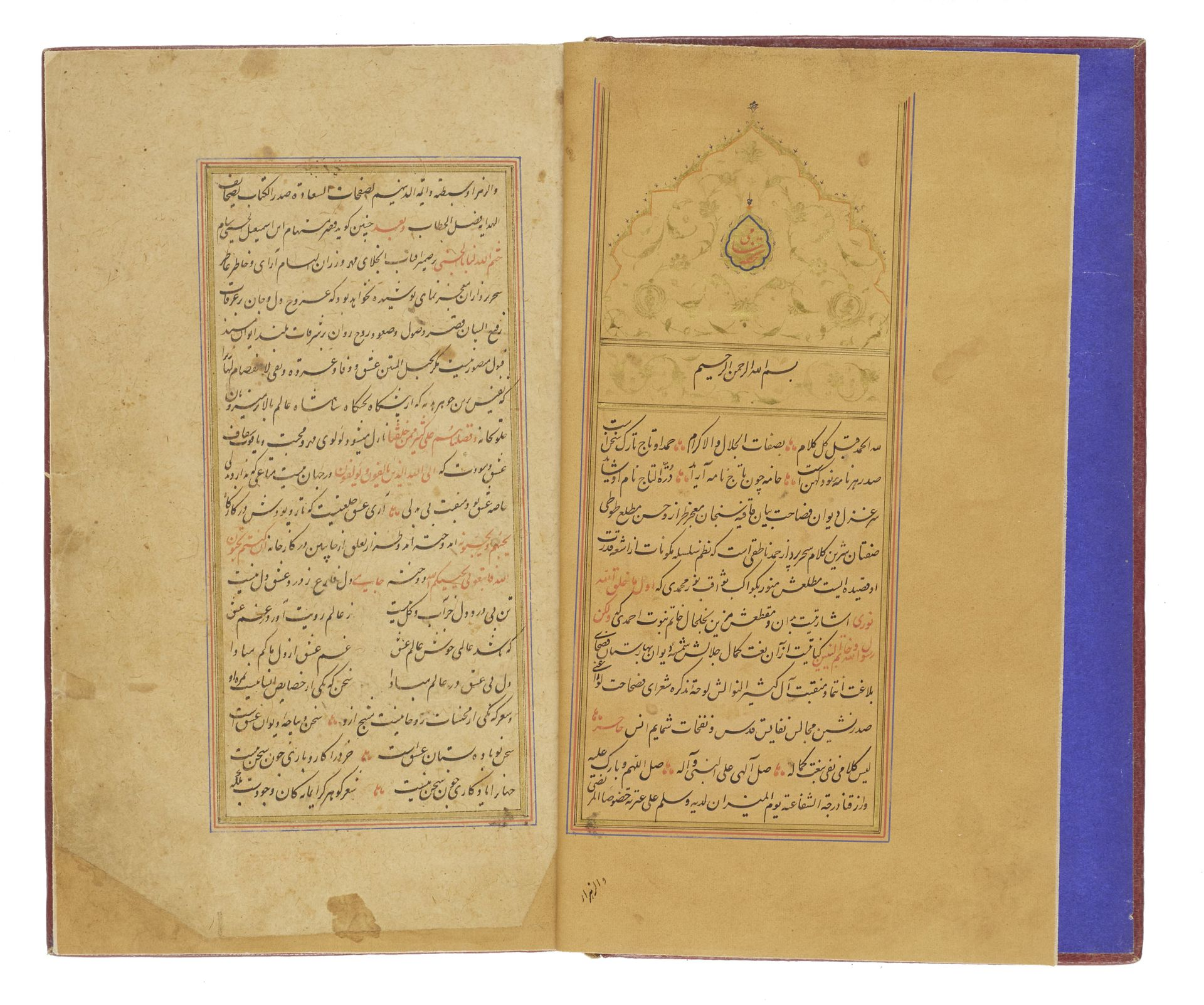
A copied manuscript of the Tohfa-ye Sami, made in Safavid Iran, dated March/April 1614

Writing under the pen name "Sami", Sam Mirza is known for his Tohfa-ye Sami, a collection of biographies of contemporary Persian poets, which reflects his extensive engagement with Persian poetry and poets of his time. It was inspired by the similar work Majalis al-Nafais ("Assemblies of Precious Things") by Ali-Shir Nava'i and used the same style as that of the Tadhkirat al-shu'ara ("Biography of Poets") by Dawlatshah Samarqandi. The Tohfa-ye Sami comprises 714 brief biographies of distinguished poets since the rise of Ismail I. These entries generally focus on various elements such as name, origin, place of employment, roles, education, and artistic expertise. However, they often lack comprehensive details. Information about the poets' works or their preferred writing styles is occasionally missing, and credentials are sometimes left out. Sam Mirza starts by expressing admiration for the poets, claiming they have outdone the renowned poets of the past, such as Amir Khusrau, Saadi Shirazi, Anvari and Ferdowsi.

Chapter one focuses on the rulers of the era, starting with Ismail I and his family, but also including enemies like the Uzbek ruler Ubaidullah Khan, who fought against Sam Mirza over the control of Herat. Chapter two focuses on prominent descendants of the Islamic prophet Muhammad and the Shia clergy. Chapter three focuses on viziers and high-ranking officials from the scribal class. Chapter four focuses on influential figures who sometimes wrote poetry. Chapter five focuses on the main figures in poetry, with major ones first and lesser ones later. Chapter six focuses on Turkic-speaking poets writing in Persian. Chapter seven focuses on poetasters.

Two elements are consistently present in the biographies: the place of origin and a verse quotation, though often limited to a single line, typically the first couplet (matla') of a ghazal. Sam Mirza views Persian poetry as something shaped by all the different places where it is practiced, rather than focusing on just one place, so that he can show the true essence of Persian poetry. He shows an interest in the inclusion and spread of poetry throughout different social classes, from everyday workers to those of high status. Particularly, he is interested in simpler jobs such as trading and crafting.

Sam Mirza is also reported to have written a divan (collection of poems), which has not survived. It was said to encompass 6,000 verses, according to the Iranian intellectual Mohammad Ali Tarbiat, who saw a manuscript of it, quoting one of its ghazals. Some other verses are also quoted in the Tohfa-ye Sami. Sam Mirza most likely served as a role model for his nephew Ibrahim Mirza, who was a poet and artist.

== Family ==
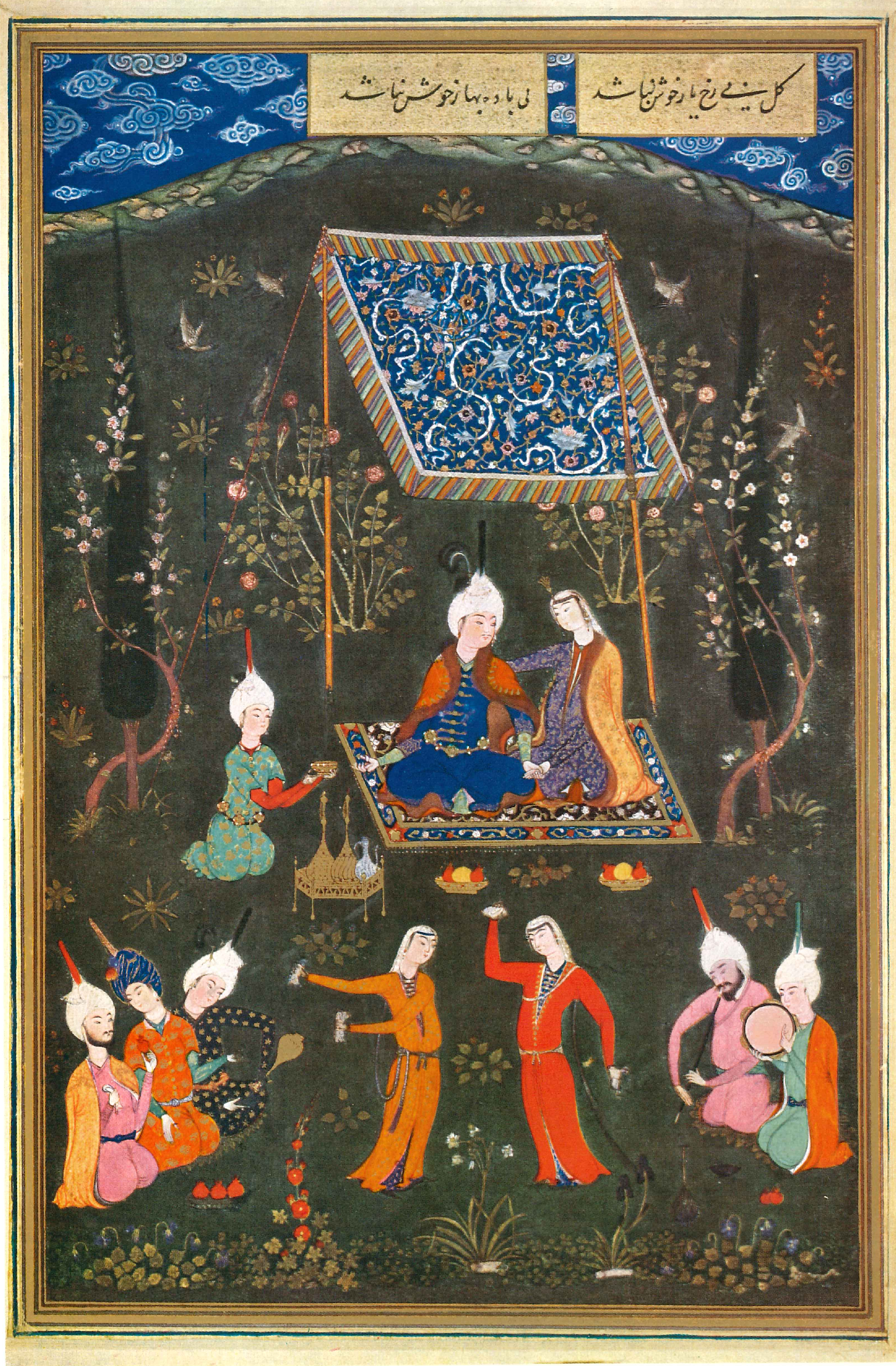
A page from Cartier Hafiz, portraying Sam Mirza with a female lover in the center, dated c. 1533.

Sam Mirza was married to Hoseyn Khan Shamlu's daughter. He had a son named Rostam Mirza, who was married to a member of the Sheykhavand family. Still a young age, he died of smallpox in the spring of 1554. Sam Mirza also had a daughter, who was married to Isa Khan Gorji. According to the 17th-century historian Abdul Hamid Lahori, Mir ʽAref Ardebili, a son of Sam Mirza, entered the household of Akbar (r. 1556–1605), the Mughal emperor, but did not accept any offers of office on the account of his Sufi beliefs. His descendants established themselves in Lahore and continued to receive cash prizes from the Mughal emperors.

== Sources ==
- Amanat, Abbas (2017). Iran: A Modern History. Yale University Press. ISBN 978-0300112542.
- Blair, Sheila (2014). Text and image in medieval Persian art. Edinburgh: Edinburgh University Press. ISBN 978-0748655786.
- Dabashi, Hamid (2019). The Shahnameh: The Persian Epic as World Literature. Columbia University Press. ISBN 978-0231183444.
- Fleischer, C. (1989). "Alqās Mirza". In Yarshater, Ehsan (ed.). Encyclopædia Iranica. Vol. III: Ātaš–Bayhaqī, Ẓahīr-al-Dīn. London and New York: Routledge & Kegan Paul. pp. 907–909. ISBN 978-0-71009-121-5.
- Floor, Willem (2008). Titles and Emoluments in Safavid Iran: A Third Manual of Safavid Administration, by Mirza Naqi Nasiri. Mage Publishers. ISBN 978-1933823232.
- Floor, Willem; Javadi, Hasan (2009). The heavenly rose-garden: a history of Shirvan & Daghestan, by Abbas Qoli Aqa Bakikhanov. Mage Publishers. ISBN 978-1933823270.
- Ghereghlou, Kioumars (2018). A Chronicle of the Early Safavids and the Reign of Shah Isma'il (907-930/1501-1524). American Oriental Society. ISBN 978-0940490017.
- Ghereghlou, Kioumars (2020). "Ḡaffāri Qazvini, Aḥmad". Encyclopaedia Iranica. Brill. doi:10.1163/2330-4804_EIRO_COM_11942.
- Gray, Basil (1961). La Peinture Persane. Skira. p. 136. ASIN B0000DNJL4.
- Khan, Mohammad Afzal (1998). Abbasi, Shahid Ali (ed.). "Safavis in Mughal Service: the Mirzas of Qandahar". Islamic Culture. 72 (1). Academic and Cultural Publications Charitable Trust: 59–81. ISSN 0021-1834. OCLC 880469373.
- Mitchell, Colin (2021). "Custodial politics and princely governance in sixteenth-century Safavid Iran". In Matthee, Rudi (ed.). The Safavid World. Routledge. pp. 79–110. ISBN 978-1138944060.
- Newman, Andrew J. (2008). Safavid Iran: Rebirth of a Persian Empire. I.B.Tauris. ISBN 978-0857716613.
- Reinert, B. (1995). "Sām Mīrzā". In Bosworth, C. E.; van Donzel, E.; Heinrichs, W. P. & Lecomte, G. (eds.). The Encyclopaedia of Islam, Second Edition. Volume VIII: Ned–Sam. Leiden: E. J. Brill. ISBN 978-90-04-09834-3.
- Roxburgh, David (2000). Prefacing the Image: The Writing of Art History in Sixteenth-Century Iran. Brill Publishers. ISBN 978-9004113763.
- Simpson, Marianna S.; Simpson-Shreve, M.; Farhad, M. (1997). Sultan Ibrahim Mirza's Haft Awrang: A Princely Manuscript from Sixteenth-Century Iran. Yale University Press. ISBN 978-0300068023.
- Sharma, Sunil (2021). "Local and Transregional Places in the Works of Safavid Men of Letters". In Melville, Charles (ed.). Safavid Persia in the Age of Empires, the Idea of Iran Vol. 10. Bloomsbury Publishing. pp. 309–330. ISBN 978-0755633777.
- Soudavar, Abolala (1992). Art of the Persian courts : selections from the Art and History Trust Collection. New York : Rizzoli. p. 156. ISBN 978-0-8478-1660-6.
- Welch, Stuart Cary (1976). Persian painting : five royal Safavid manuscripts of the sixteenth century. New York : G. Braziller. ISBN 978-0807608135.
