= Hoseyn Khan Shamlu =

Safavid governor of Herat from c. 1524 to 1529

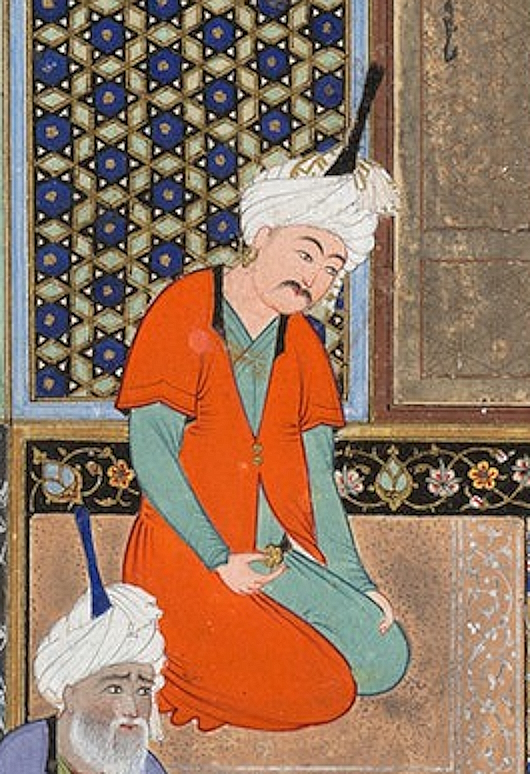
- Likely depiction of Hoseyn Khan Shamlu seated, in the Sermon in a mosque scene of the Cartier Hafiz.

Governor of Herat
- In office 1524–1529
- Monarchs: Ismail I (r. 1501–1524); Tahmasp I (r. 1524–1576)
- Preceded by: Durmish Khan Shamlu
- Succeeded by: Unnamed

Personal details
- Died: 1533
- Parent: Abdi Beg Shamlu (father)
- Relatives: Durmish Khan Shamlu (brother)
- Tribe: Shamlu

Hoseyn Khan Shamlu, also Husain Khan Shamlu (Persian: حسین‌خان شاملو; died 1535), son of Abdi Beg Shamlu, was a member of the Turkoman Shamlu tribe, and a Safavid governor of Herat from 1524–25. He was nephew of Shah Ismail I, his father Abdi Beg Shamlu having married a sister of the Shah. He was also a brother of Durmeš Khan Šāmlu, whom he replaced as Governor of Herat upon his death.

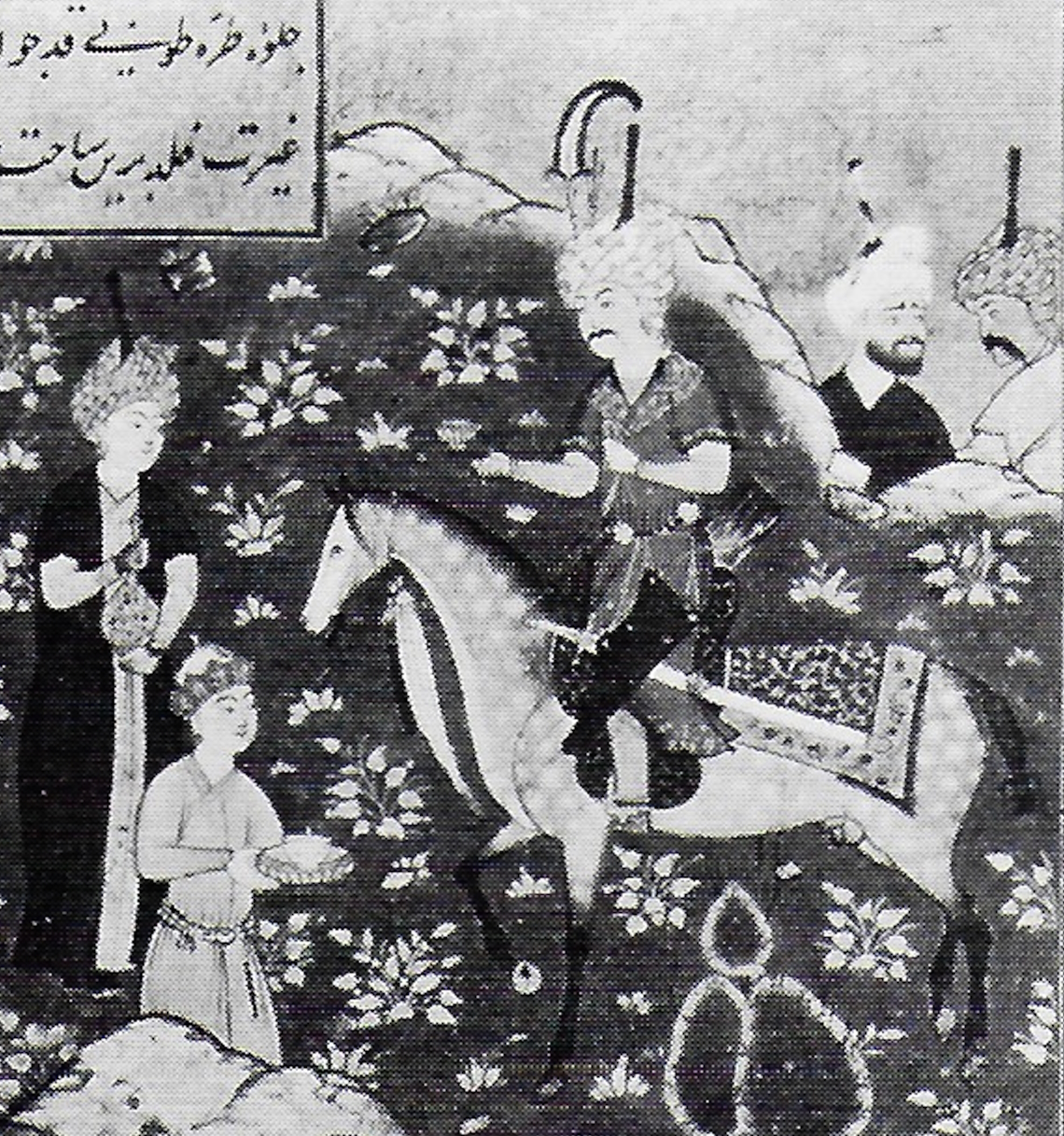
Likely depiction of Hoseyn Khan Shamlu on horse, in the Polo scene of the Cartier Hafiz.

Hoseyn Khan Shamlu was the Lala (guardian) of the young prince Sam Mirza. He married one of his daughters to him. They had a daughter who was married to the Georgian ruler Prince Jesse of Kakheti.

In 1525–26 and in 1526–27, Hoseyn Khan Shamlu resisted the offensive of the Uzbeks against Herat, standing a siege of seven months, before he was relieved by Imperial troops. However, in 1529, he was forced to surrender Herat to the Uzbek Obayd Khan. Both Hoseyn Khan Shamlu and Sam Mirza fled Herat at that time.

In 1533, Shah Tahmasp I executed Hoseyn Khan Shamlu on suspicions that he was trying to put Sam Mirza on the throne.

Hoseyn Khan Shamlu was likely portraited in two miniatures of the Cartier Hafiz painted by Shaykhzada in Herat circa 1527: the Sermon in a mosque, and the now-lost Polo scene. Hoseyn Khan Shamlu was Shaykhzada' patron, and he is depicted in these two miniatures as a mature man with a full mustache.

== Sources ==
- Blair, Sheila (2014). Text and image in medieval Persian art. Edinburgh: Edinburgh University Press. ISBN 978-0748655786.
- Roemer, Hans Robert (1986). Jackson, Peter; Lockhart, Laurence (eds.). The Safavid Period. The Cambridge History of Iran. Vol. 66: The Timurid and Safavid Periods. Cambridge: Cambridge University Press. ISBN 0-521-20094-6.
- Soucek, Priscilla (1990). "Sultan Muhammad Tabrizi: Painter at the Safavid Court". Persian masters: five centuries of paintings. Bombay: Marg Publications. pp. 55–58. ISBN 978-8185026107.

| Preceded by Durmish Khan Shamlu | Governor of Herat; 1525 – 1529 | Succeeded by ? |
