= Cartier Hafiz =

16th-century Persian manuscript

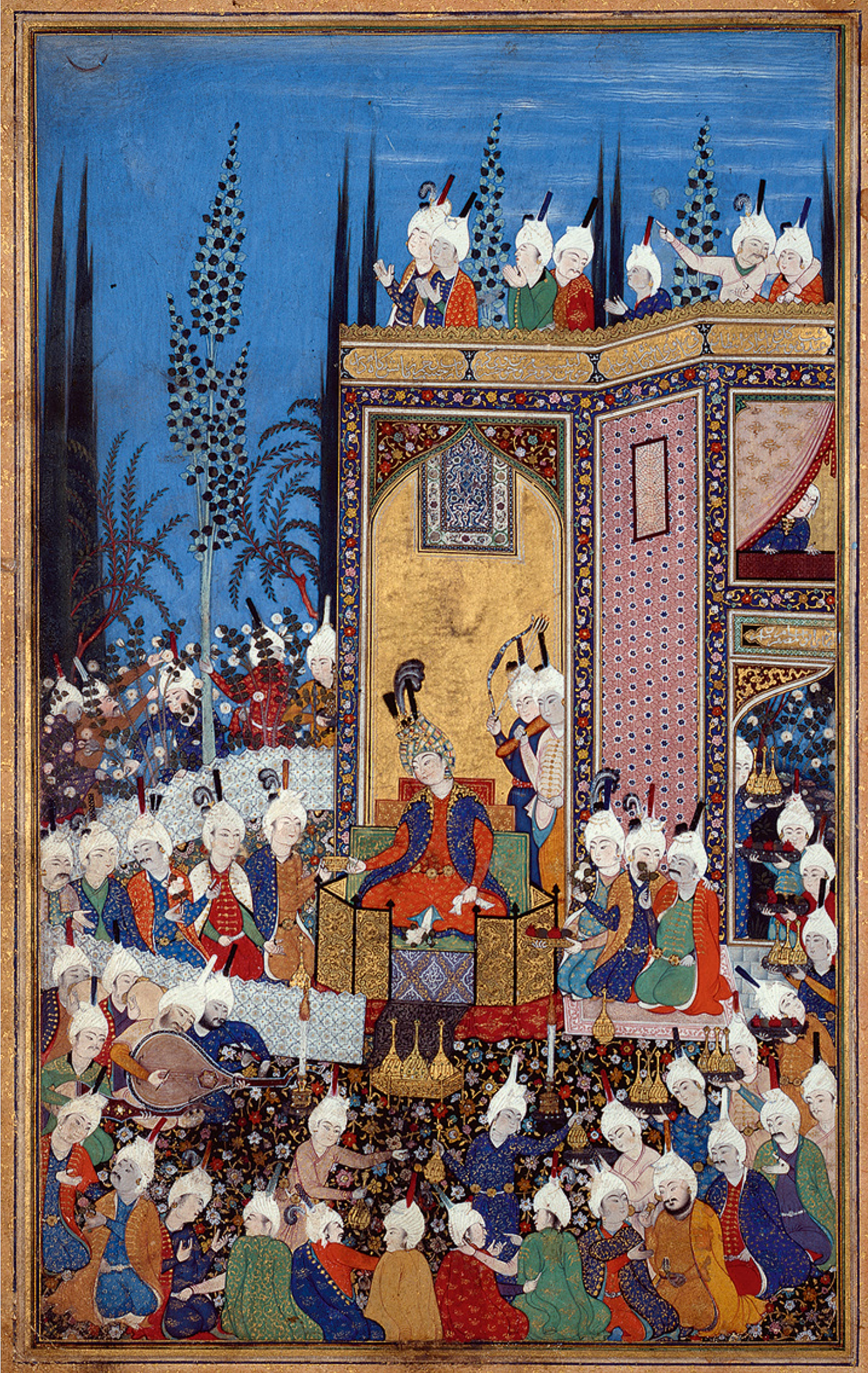
Portrait of Shah Tahmasp and his court at the Celebration of Id. Cartier Hafiz, folio 86b.

The Cartier Hafiz is a 16th-century copy of the Divan of Hafez by the 14th century poet Hafez, named after its previous owner the Parisian jeweler Louis Cartier (1875–1942). It is a medium-sized (29×18.2 cm) but luxurious volume, with a lacquer cover, 176 folios and five paintings, including one that was removed and lost during World War II. In modern times, the manuscript was dispersed by Stuart Cary Welch, and its folios are now spread between various museums and collections.

The Cartier Hafiz was created by a court atelier, as demonstrated by its quality, and two different artist worked on its miniatures: Shaykh Zadeh in Herat, and Sultan Muhammad in Tabriz. The calligraphy may be the work of Sultan Muhammad Nur. In the late 1520s, Shaykh Zadeh made two of the miniatures, the Sermon in a mosque, which he signed with a small graffito, and the now-lost polo scene. Shaykh Zadeh's patron, the Herat potentate Hoseyn Khan Shamlu, is probably depicted in these two miniatures as a mature man with a full mustache.

Three more miniatures were added, probably around 1531, by the court artist Sultan Muhammad (Soltān-Mohammad): he signed the Celebration of Id and the Allegory of drunkenness, and also probably painted The lovers picnicking, which is in the same style.

== Celebration of Id ==
The Celebration of Id has two verses from a ghazal of Hafez inscribed by the painter on top of the palace:

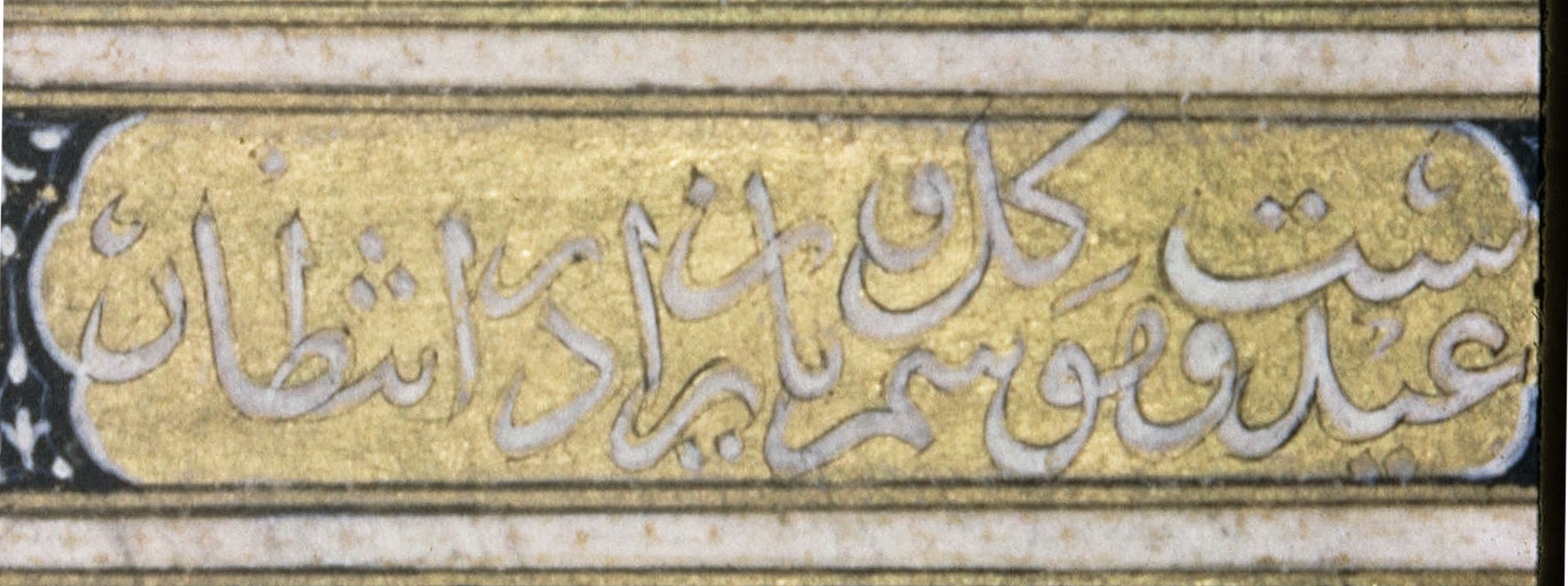
Original inscription of top of the Palace: Persian: عیدست و موسم گل و یاران در انتظار "Friends eagerly await, for it is the season of Id and roses"

Friends eagerly await, for it is the season of Id and roses,

Saqi (wine bearer)! Behold the refulgent moon in the King’s resplendent face and bring wine!
He is fortunate, a noble ruler. O God, spare him from the evil eye. (Note: عیدست و موسم گل و یاران در انتظار ساقی بروی شاه ببین ماه و می بیار خوش دولتیست خرم و خوش خسروی کریم یارب ز چشم زخم زمانش نگاه دار)

This verse was initially composed by Hafez circa 1376, for his ruler the Muzaffarid king Shah Shoja. The ruler enthroned in the center of the 16th century painting is certainly the Safavid Shah Tahmasp. On the throne, at the feet of his ruler, Sultan Muhammad added his signature: "The work (amal) of Sultan Muhammad of 'Eraq". Various adjectives fit for a king surround the signature: victory (fatḥ), [divine] assistance (nuṣrat), good fortune (dawlat), triumph (pirūzī), and [long] life (`umr).

=== "Sam Mirza" doorway inscription ===
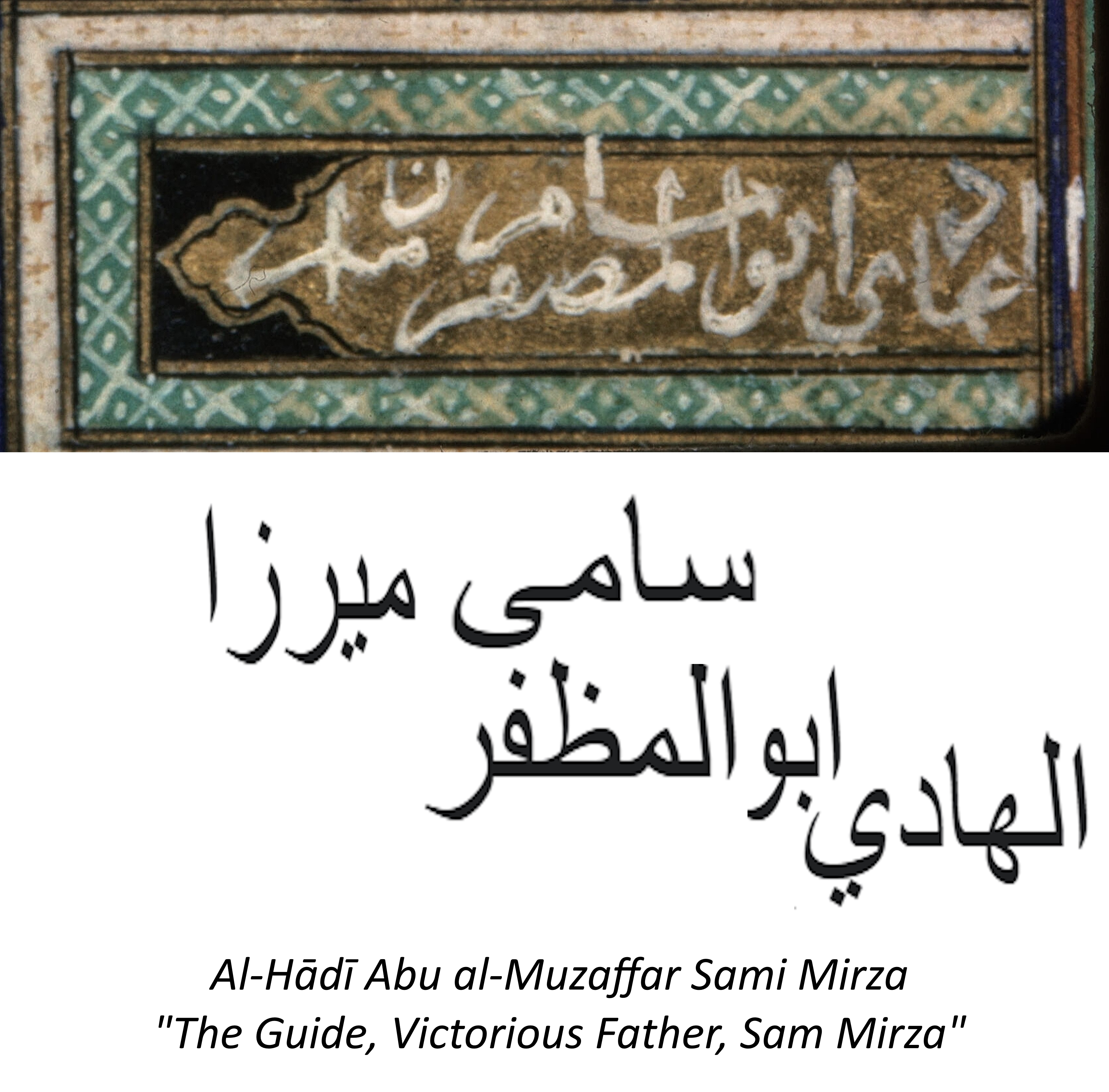
Later inscription in the name of Sam Mirza. Celebration of Id, 1531.

Later, the manuscript apparently entered into the possession of Tahmasp's brother Sam Mirza. Sam Mirza added his name over the doorway. The added text reads "al-Hādī Abu’l-Muzaffar Sam Mīrzā" ("The Guide, the Victorious Father, Sam Mīrzā"). "The Guide" was normally a title reserved to Shah Ismail himself or to Tahmasp, and the title "Abu’l-Muzaffar" belonged to Tahmasp as well (whereas Sam Mirza used "Abu’l-Nasr" in his titulature).

According to Soudavar, the script of this sentence above the doorway is markedly inferior to that of the inscription on top of the palace: it was hastily written, and lacks the fine black outline. It is also not properly centered, and even starts outside of the miniature, as the first two letter ("al") are written in the margin. It was not written in the hand of Sultan-Muhammad, and is a later addition. The original inscription must therefore have belonged to Shah Tahmasp, and was modified later. Also, the other elements in the painting (iconography and verses), make it clear that the subject of the painting is the king, whereas Sam Mirza was only a young Governor of Herat (14 years old), under the tutelage of Hoseyn Khan Shamlu when the miniatures were made. Only later in 1534 did Huseyn Khan Shamlu try to topple Shah Tahmasp and replace him with Sam Mirza, during the wars with the Ottomans. The inscription may suggest some attempt at symbolical usurpation, Sam Mirza trying to put himself in the royal place of his brother Shah Tahmasp, claiming for himself both the titulatures of Shah Ismail and Shah Tashmap.

Earlier authors, such as Gray (1961) or Stuart Gary Welch (1976) used to attribute the painting as a depiction of Sam Mirza and his court without further questioning the validity of the inscription over the doorway.

== Allegory of drunkenness ==
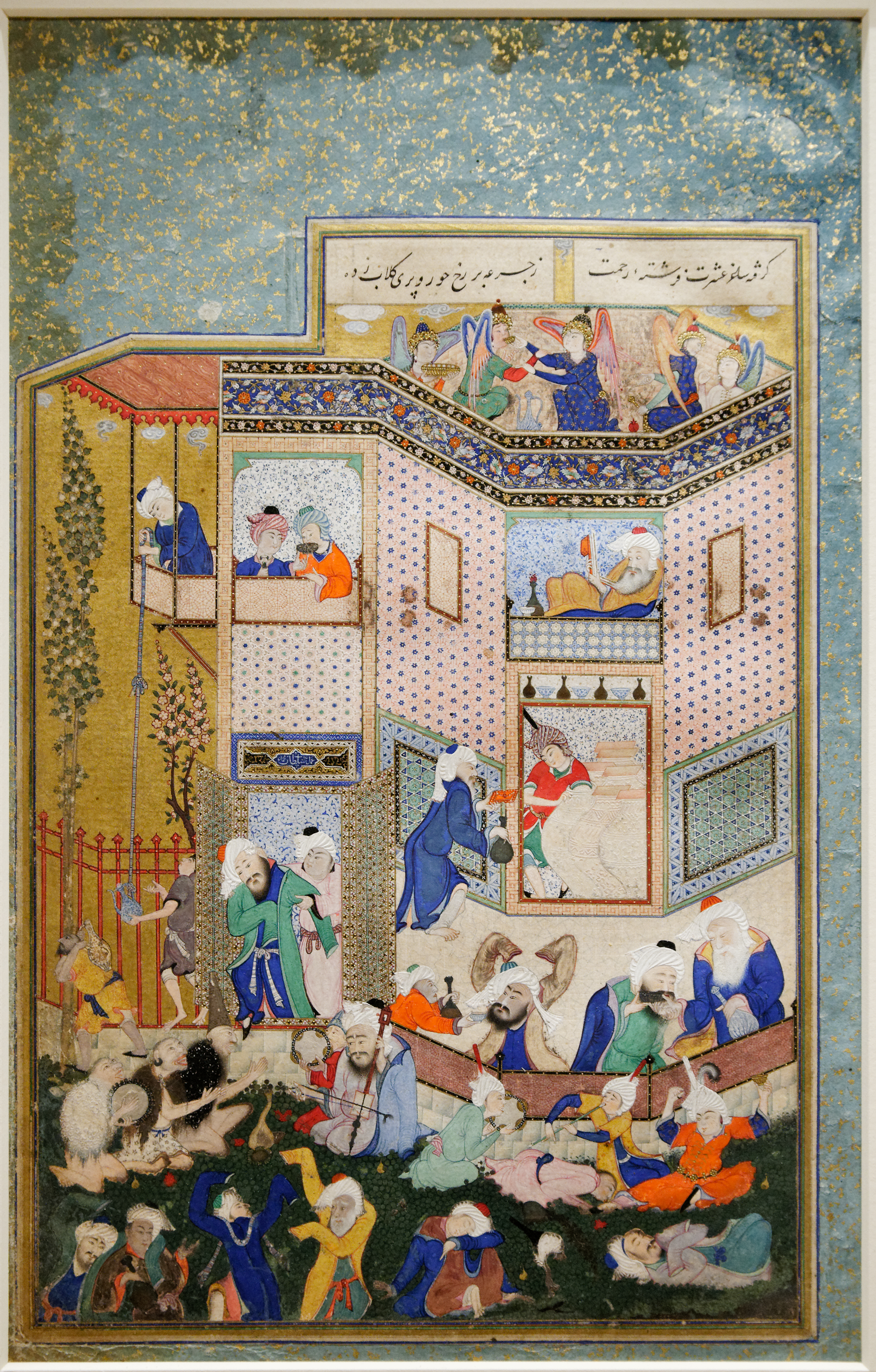
Allegory of drunkenness. Hafez appears in the window over the jars, painted by Sultan Mohammed circa 1531.

Also called Worldly and otherworldly drunkenness, a work by Sultan Mohammed, and signed by him over the doorway in the miniature. It was created in Tabriz in 1531–33. The painting shows drinking in a tavern, with much singing and dancing. Even angels are drinking and reveling on the roof of the pavilion, providing a metaphysical dimension to the state of drunkenness, akin to enlightenment. According to Soucek (1990) "The painting illustrates an important theme in the poetry of Hafiz, drawing a parallel between drinking wine and the source of creative inspiration behind the writing of poetry." The 14th century Hafez himself appears in the window over the jars, reincarnated in a visibly drunken state.

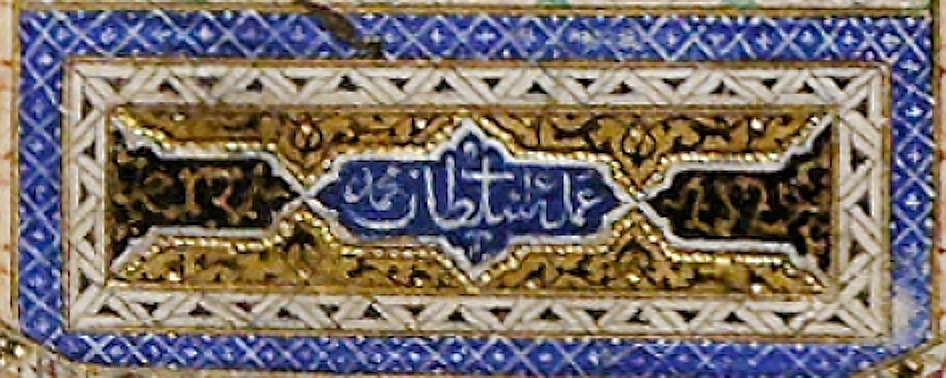
Signature of Sultan Mohammed:
Persian: عمل سلطان محمد
"The work of Sultan Muhammad"
over the doorway.

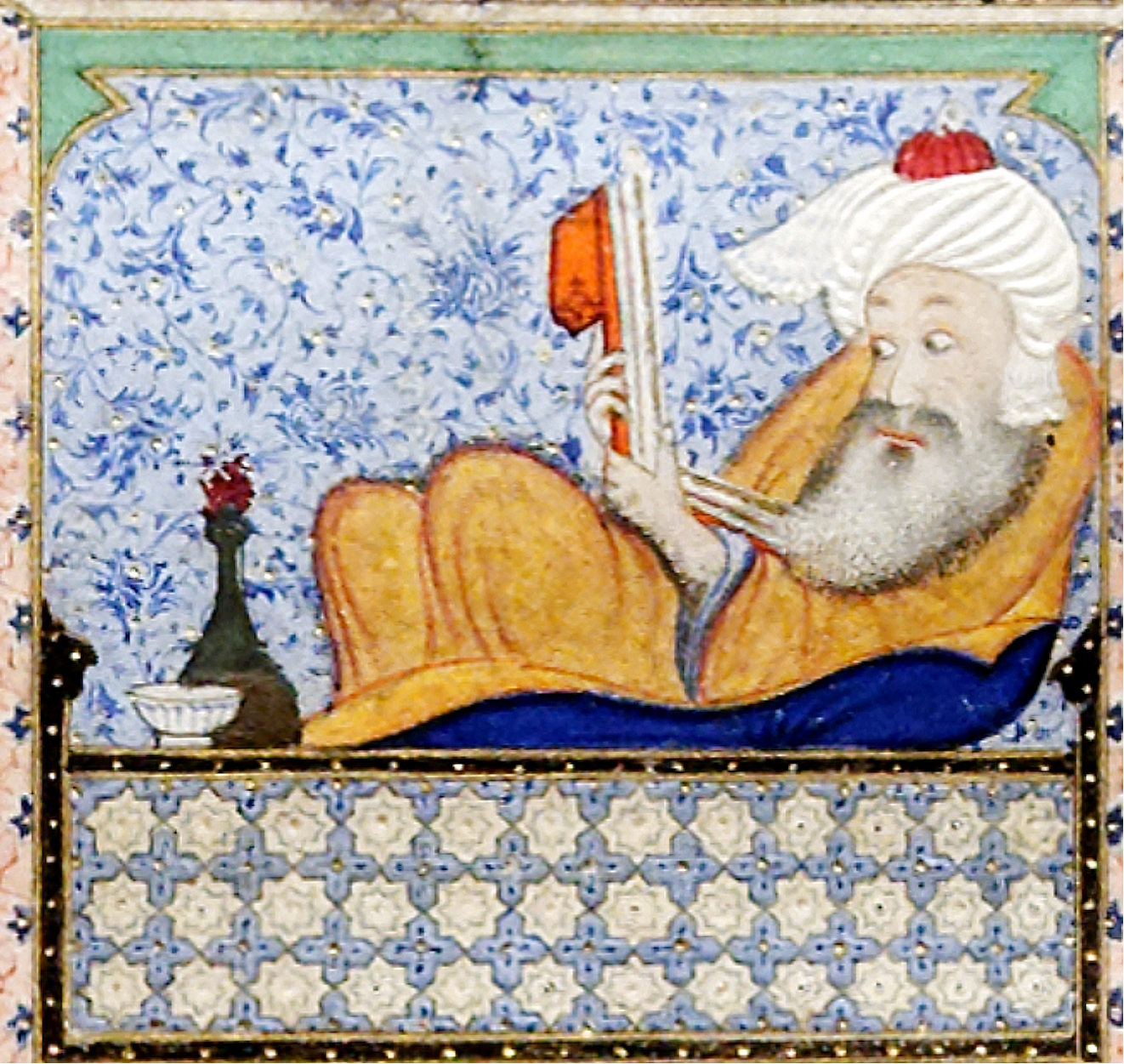
Depiction of Hafez holding a book, his physiognomy suggesting an altered state.

This painting was created during the time when Sam Mirza was a refugee at the court of his brother Shah Tahmasp in Tabriz, having fled Herat, invaded by the Uzbeks of the Khanate of Bukhara. The style of Sultan Mohhamad is a synthesis of Turkmen and Timurid styles, drawing from the palette of the royal Turkmen painting style of late 15th century Tabriz, while its structuration derives from the Timurid art of Herat. His paintings also convey a sense of humor, perceivable in the expressions of his protagonists.

== Other miniatures ==
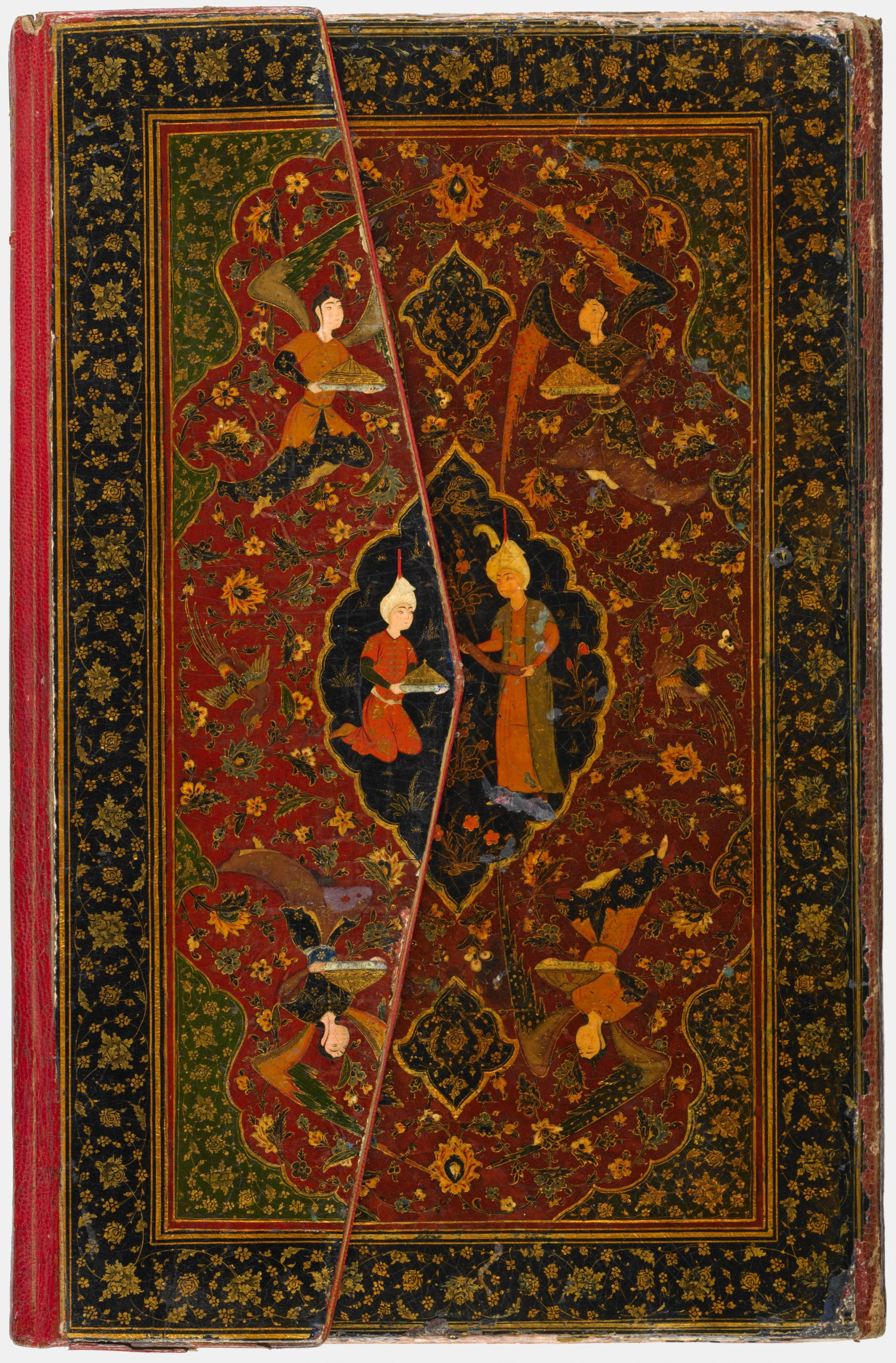
Binding, front cover

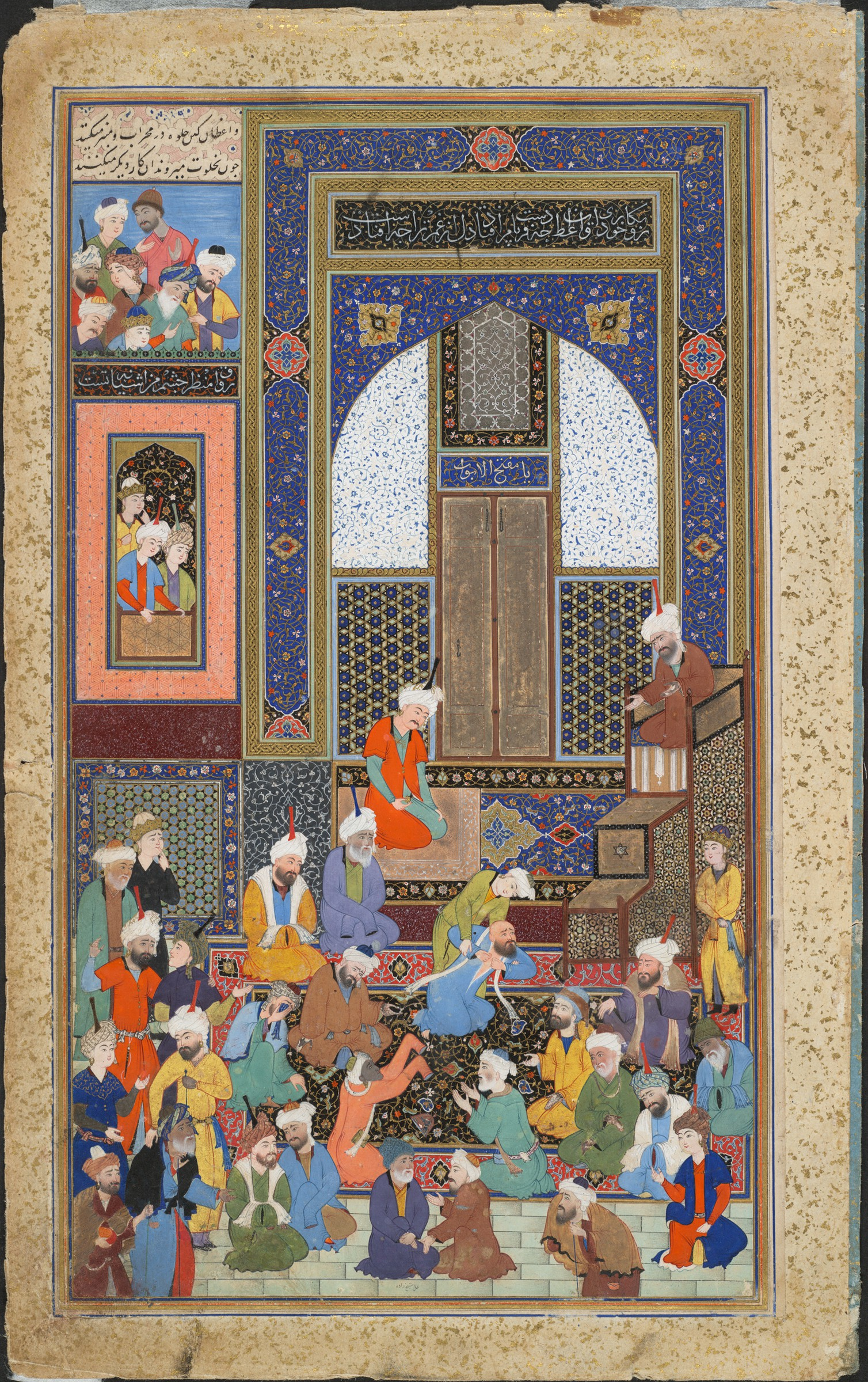
Sermon in a mosque. The central repentant appears to be Hoseyn Khan Shamlu.

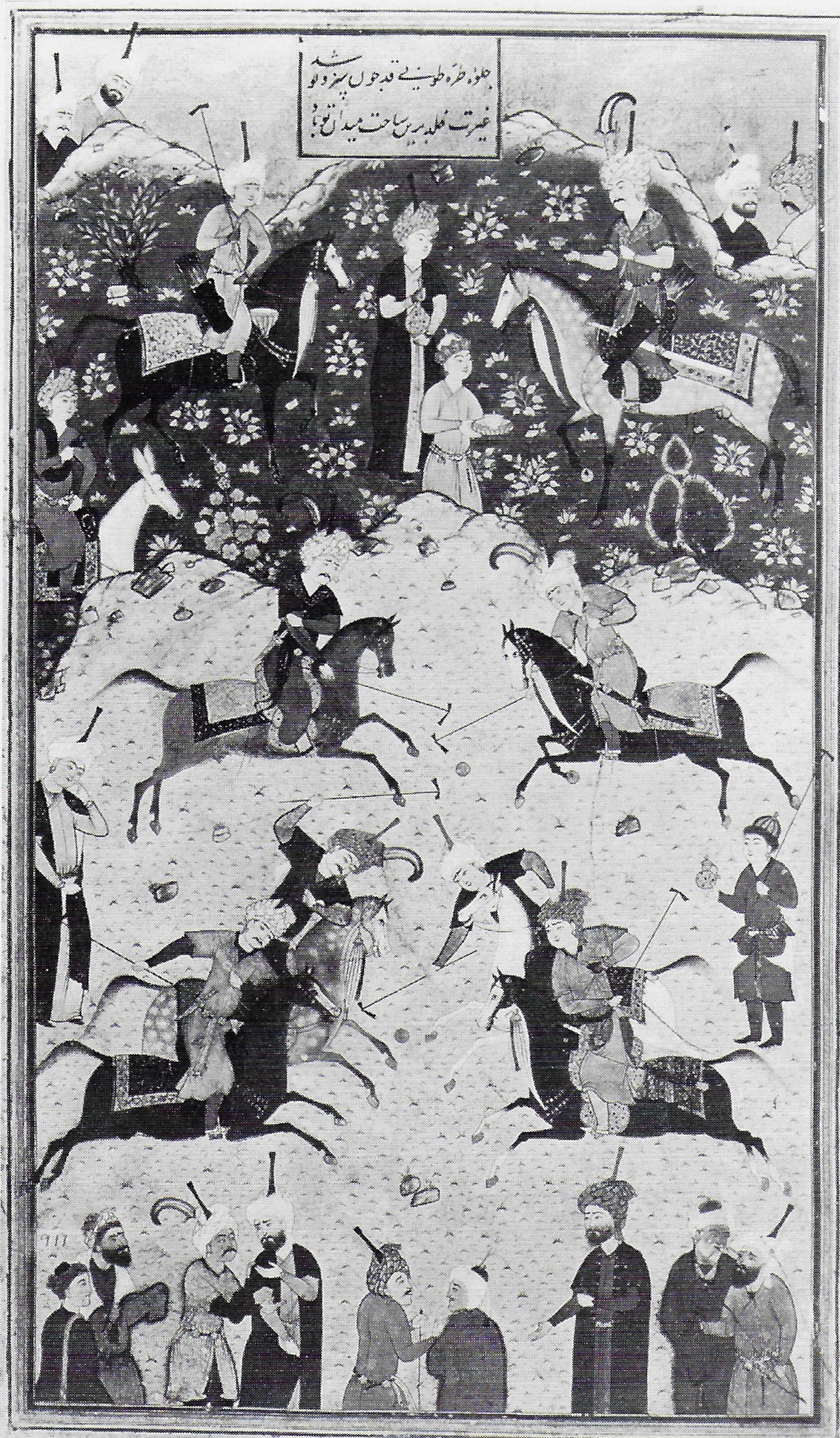
Polo scene

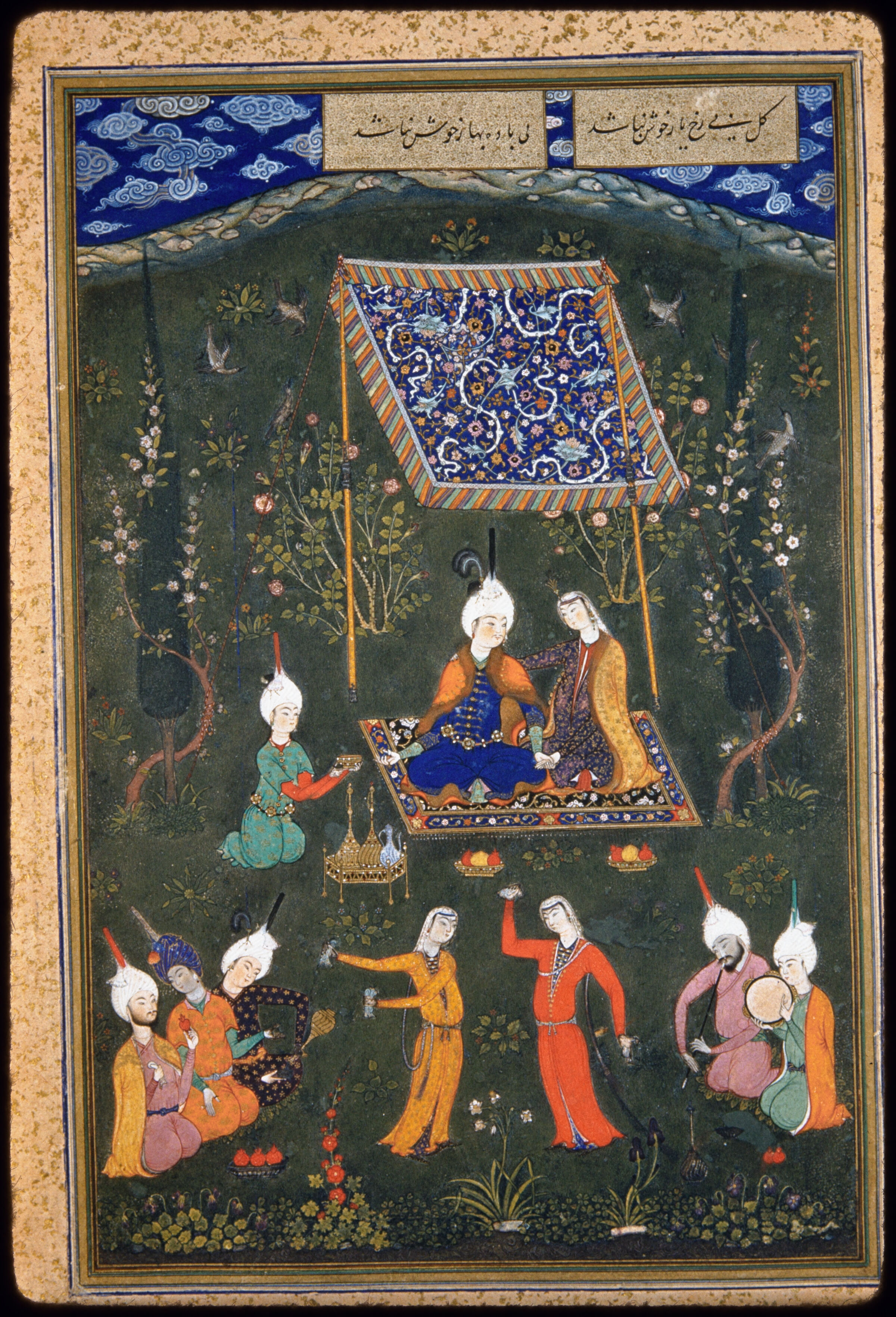
The lovers picnicking

== Sources ==
- Blair, Sheila (2014). Text and image in medieval Persian art. Edinburgh: Edinburgh University Press. ISBN 978-0748655786.
- Gray (1961). La Peinture Persane.
- Soudavar, Abolala (1992). Art of the Persian courts : selections from the Art and History Trust Collection. New York : Rizzoli. ISBN 978-0-8478-1660-6.
- Soucek, Priscilla (1990). "Sultan Muhammad Tabrizi: Painter at the Safavid Court". Persian masters: five centuries of paintings. Bombay: Marg Publications. pp. 55–58. ISBN 978-8185026107.
- Soucek, Priscilla (2003). "Interpreting the Ghazals of Hafiz". Res: Anthropology and Aesthetics. 43: 146–163. doi:10.1086/RESv43n1ms20167595. ISSN 0277-1322.
- Welch, Stuart Cary (1976). Persian painting: five royal Safavid manuscripts of the sixteenth century. New York : G. Braziller. ISBN 978-0-8076-0812-8.
