= Sultan Mohammed =

16th-century Persian miniaturist

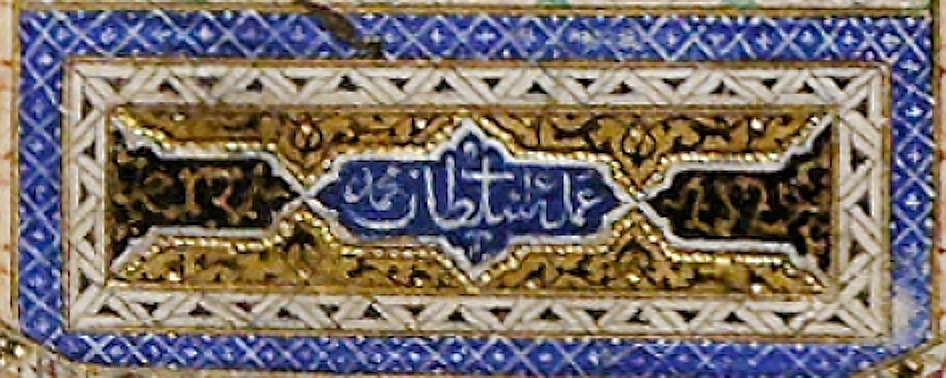
Signature of Sultan Mohammed:
Persian: عمل سلطان محمد
"The work of Sultan Muhammad"
over the doorway in Allegory of drunkenness, Cartier Hafiz, 1531, Tabriz.

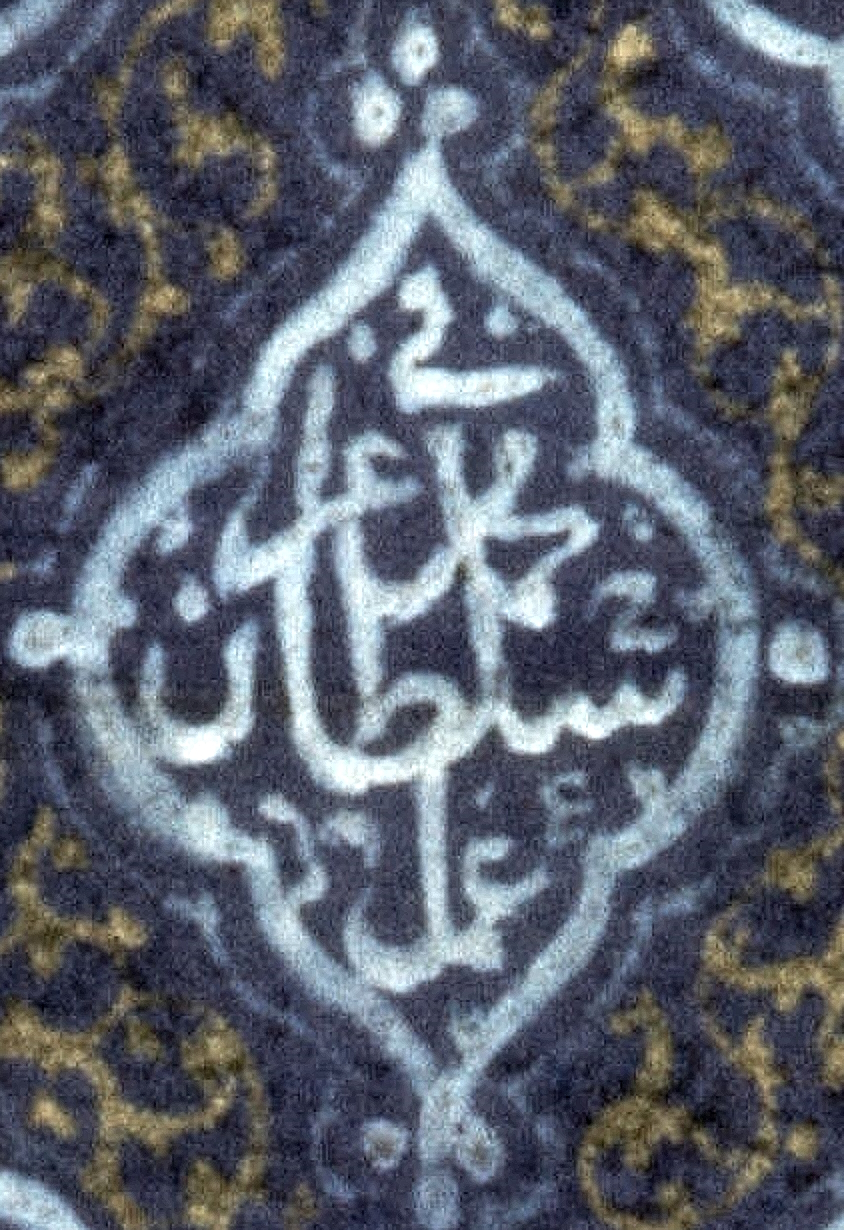
Signature of Sultan Muhammad in the Celebration of Id, Cartier Hafiz, 1531

Sultan Mohammad (Persian: سلطان محمد) was an Iranian painter at the Safavid court in Tabriz under Shah Ismail I (r. 1501–1524) and Shah Tahmasp I (r. 1524–1576). He served as the director of Shah Ismail's artists’ workshop and as the first project director of the Shahnameh of Shah Tahmasp. He gave painting lessons to Tahmasp when he was the crown prince.

Secure attribution of miniatures to Sultan Mohammed is limited: only two miniatures are directly signed by him, Celebration of Id and Allegory of drunkenness from the 1531 Cartier Hafiz, and one miniature is attributed to him by his contemporary Dust Muhammad: The Court of Gayumars. The other miniatures are attributed to him based on stylistic similarities and other circumstantial evidence.

Sultan Mohammad was a native of Tabriz. He was the father of the artist Mirza Ali, who also contributed to the Shahnameh of Shah Tahmasp, and the grandfather of the painter and illuminator Mir Zayn al-'Abidin, who was active in the last quarter of the sixteenth century. He died before 1555.

== Khamsa of Nizami (1481) ==
Around 1505, while in Tabriz, Sultan Mohammed was asked by Ismail I (r. 1501-24) to complete a Turkoman manuscript, the Khamsa of Nizami (Tabriz, 1481), with eleven new miniatures. The miniatures created by Sultan Mohammed are on folios 12, 38v, 46, 89 v, 192, 196, 233, 244 and 285 of the manuscript. The criteria used to differentiate the Safavid miniatures from the Turkoman ones in this manuscript is for a great part iconographic, as the protagonists in Sultan Mohammed's paintings generally wear Shah Isma'il's signature turban, the Taj-i Haydari, which he introduced when he occupied Tabriz in 1501-1502.

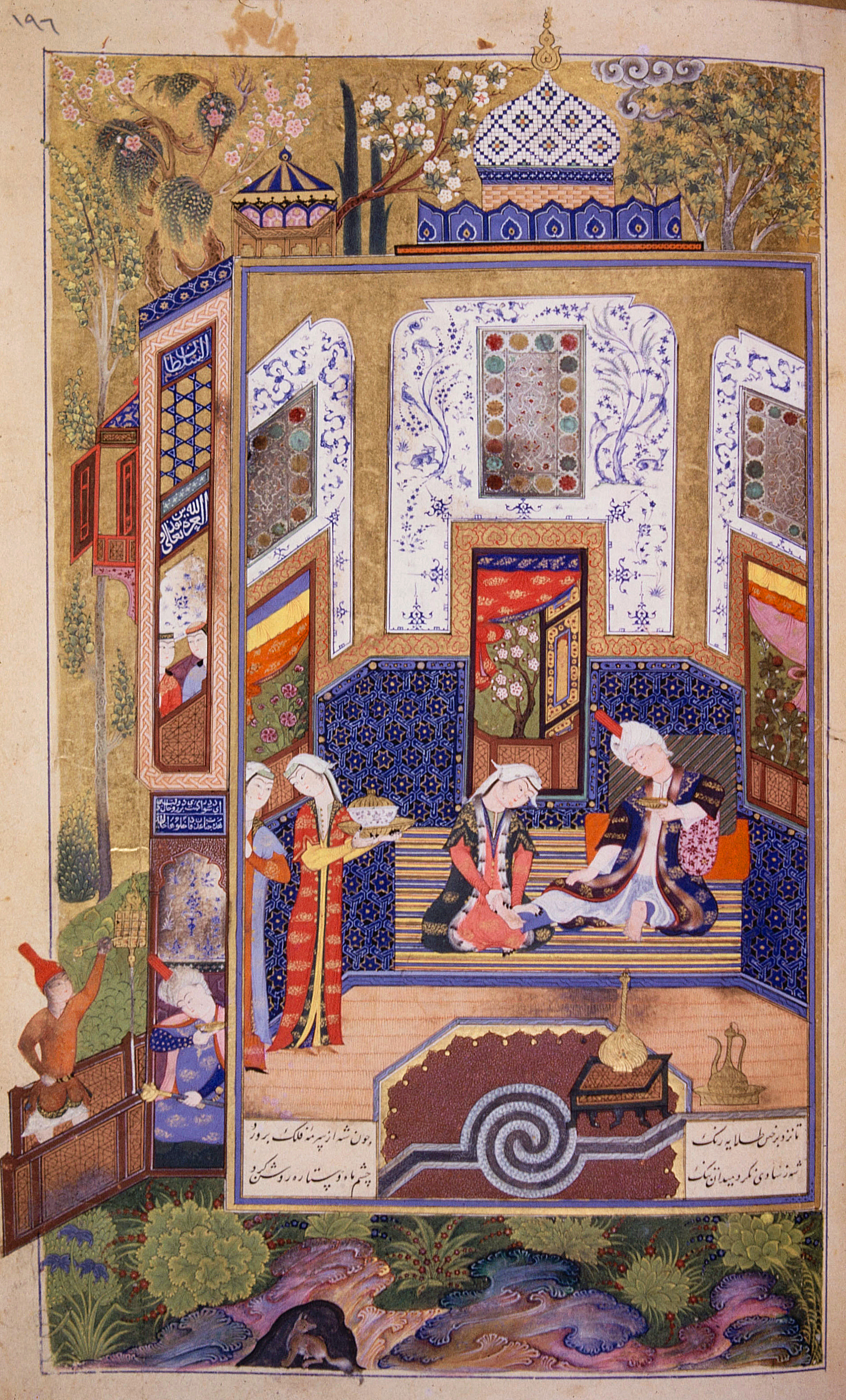
Bahram Gur in the White Pavilion, Khamsa of Nizami. Sultan Mohammed circa 1505, Tabriz (Topkapi H. 762).

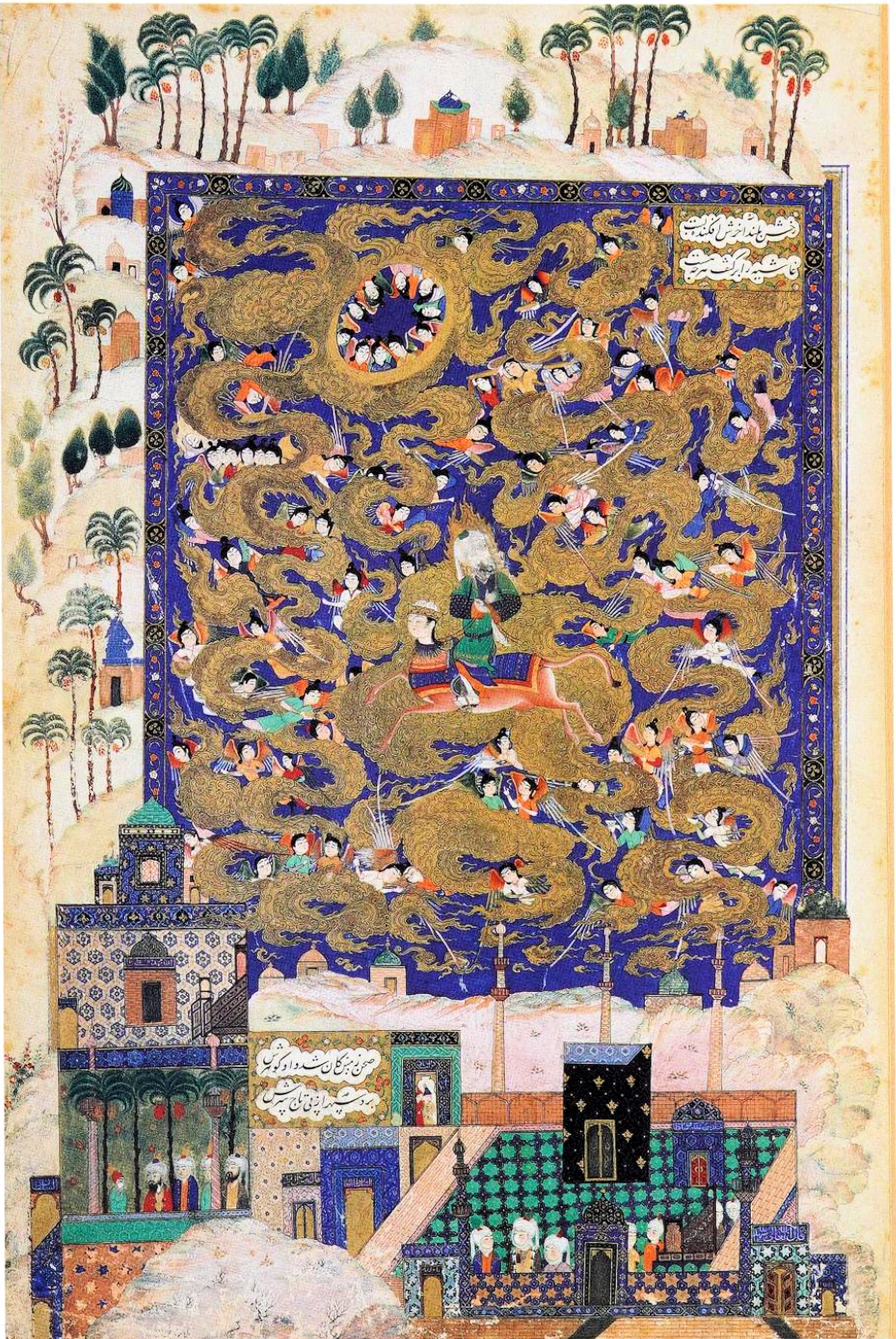
The Mir'aj of Prophet Muhammad, Khamsa of Nizami. Sultan Mohammed circa 1505, Tabriz (Keir Collection, III. 207)

== Shahnameh of Shah Tahmasp (c.1520-1535) ==
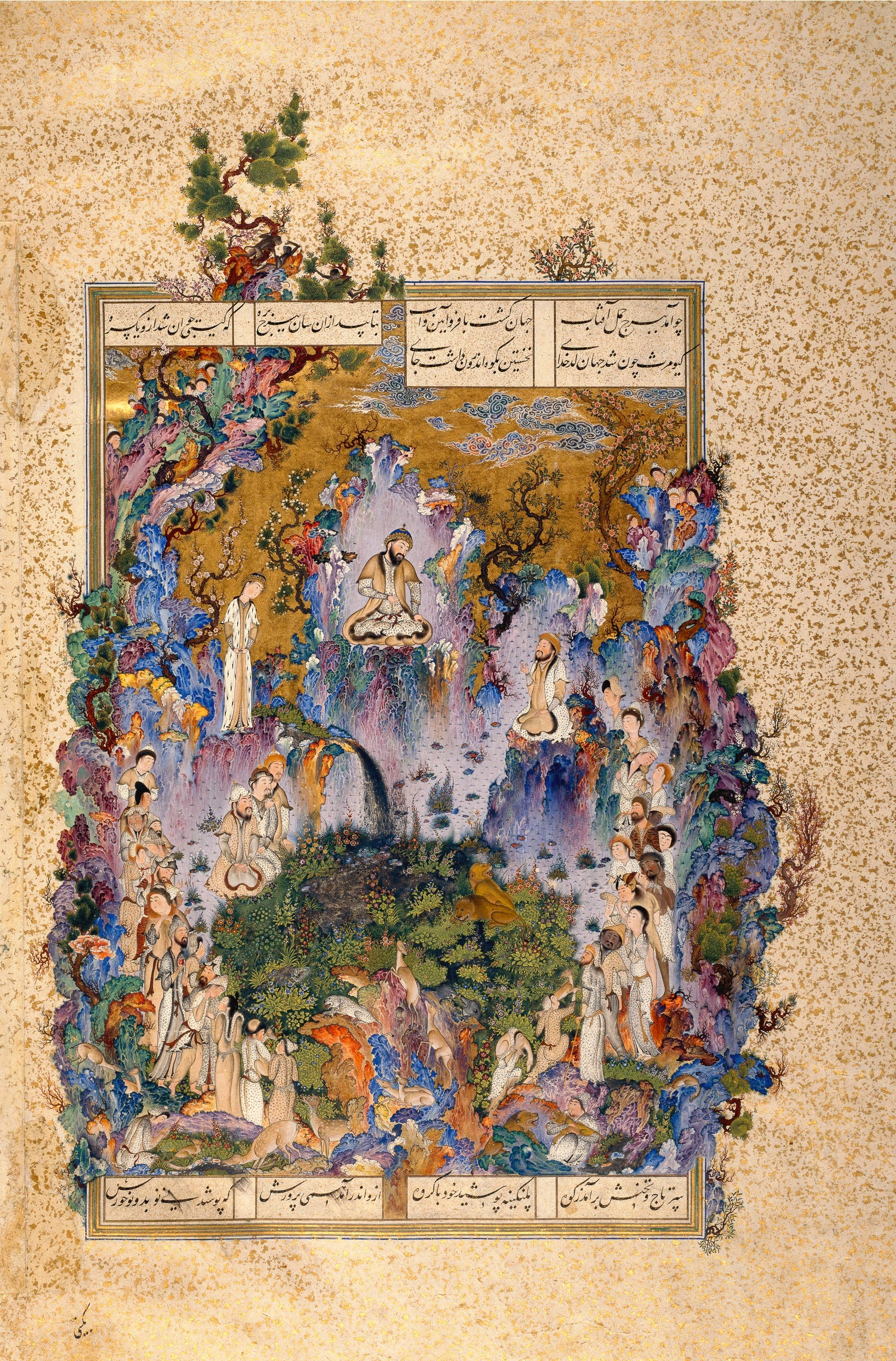
"The Court of Gayumars", Folio 20v from the Shahnameh of Shah Tahmasp; c. 1522−25; opaque watercolor, ink, and gold on paper; painting is 34.2 cm (height) x 23.1 cm (width); the Aga Khan Museum. The painting is attributed to Sultan Mohammad based on the contemporary testimony of Dust Muhammad.

Sultan Mohammad’s style was initially based in the Turkman courtly idiom. Sheila R. Canby writes that around 1515, he was perfecting scenes of “man and animal inhabiting a natural world of roaring winds, lush and frenzied vegetation and rocks resembling grotesque faces”, of which his painting “Rustam Sleeping while Rakhsh Fights a Lion” from an unfinished Shahnameh is an example. In the 1520s however, Sultan Mohammad was influenced by the more sedate and subtle late Timurid mode practiced at Herat; his compositions became more orderly and architectonic.

Sultan Mohammad’s painting “The Court of Gayumars” is widely considered the “crowning achievement” of the Shahnameh of Shah Tahmasp. It has been estimated that the artist worked on the painting for three years. In 1544, Dust Muhammad described it as “such that the lion-hearted of the jungle of depiction and the leopards and crocodiles of the workshop of ornamentation quail at the fangs of his pen and bend their necks before the awesomeness of his pictures,” making it one of the few individual paintings to be referenced in any sixteenth century text.

Other than the Shahnameh of Shah Tahmasp, Sultan Mohammad may have contributed to an illustrated manuscript of the Story of Jamal and Jalal of Muhammad Asafi that was copied by the scribe Sultan Ali Qayini in 1502–3 at Herat but then travelled west.

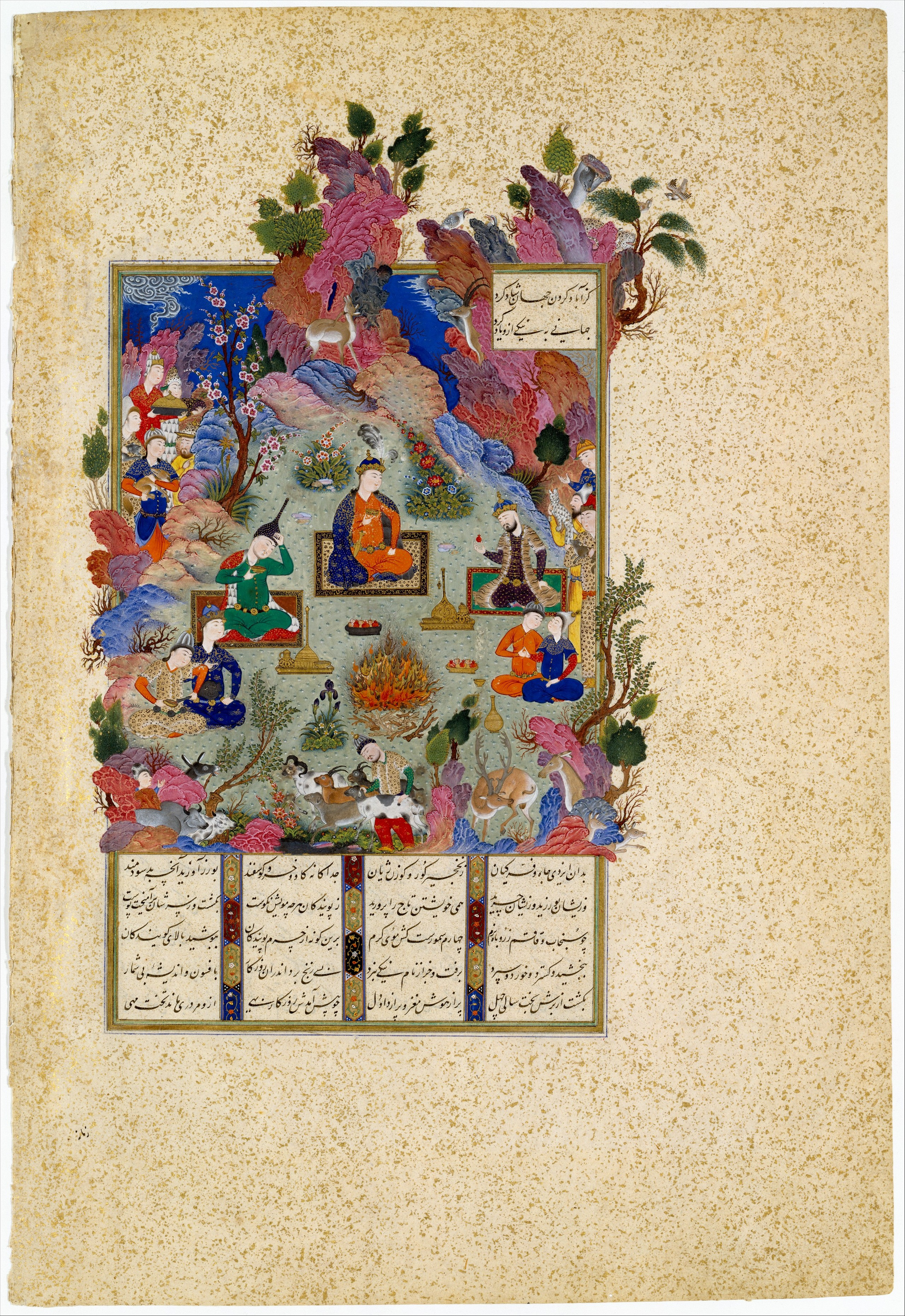
"The Feast of Sada", Folio 22v from the Shahnameh of Shah Tahmasp; c. 1525; opaque watercolor, ink, silver, and gold on paper; painting is 24.1 cm (height) x 23 cm (width), entire page is 47 cm (height) x 31.8 cm (width); the Metropolitan Museum of Art. The painting is attributed to Sultan Mohammad.

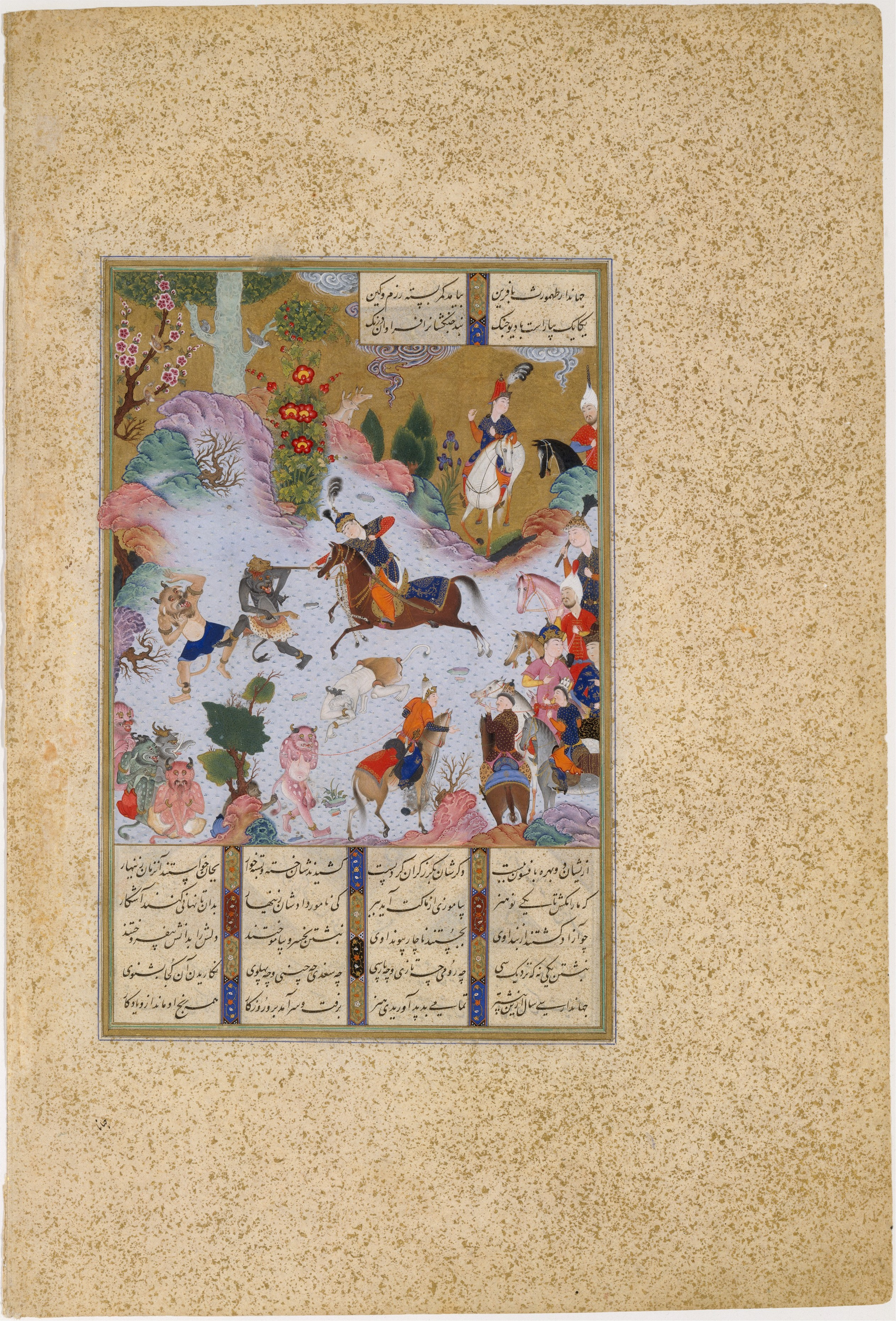
"Tahmuras Defeats the Divs", Folio 23v from the Shahnameh of Shah Tahmasp; c. 1525; opaque watercolor, ink, silver, and gold on paper; painting is 28.3 cm (height) x 18.6 cm (width), entire page is 47 cm (height) by 32.1 cm (width); the Metropolitan Museum of Art. The painting is attributed to Sultan Mohammad.

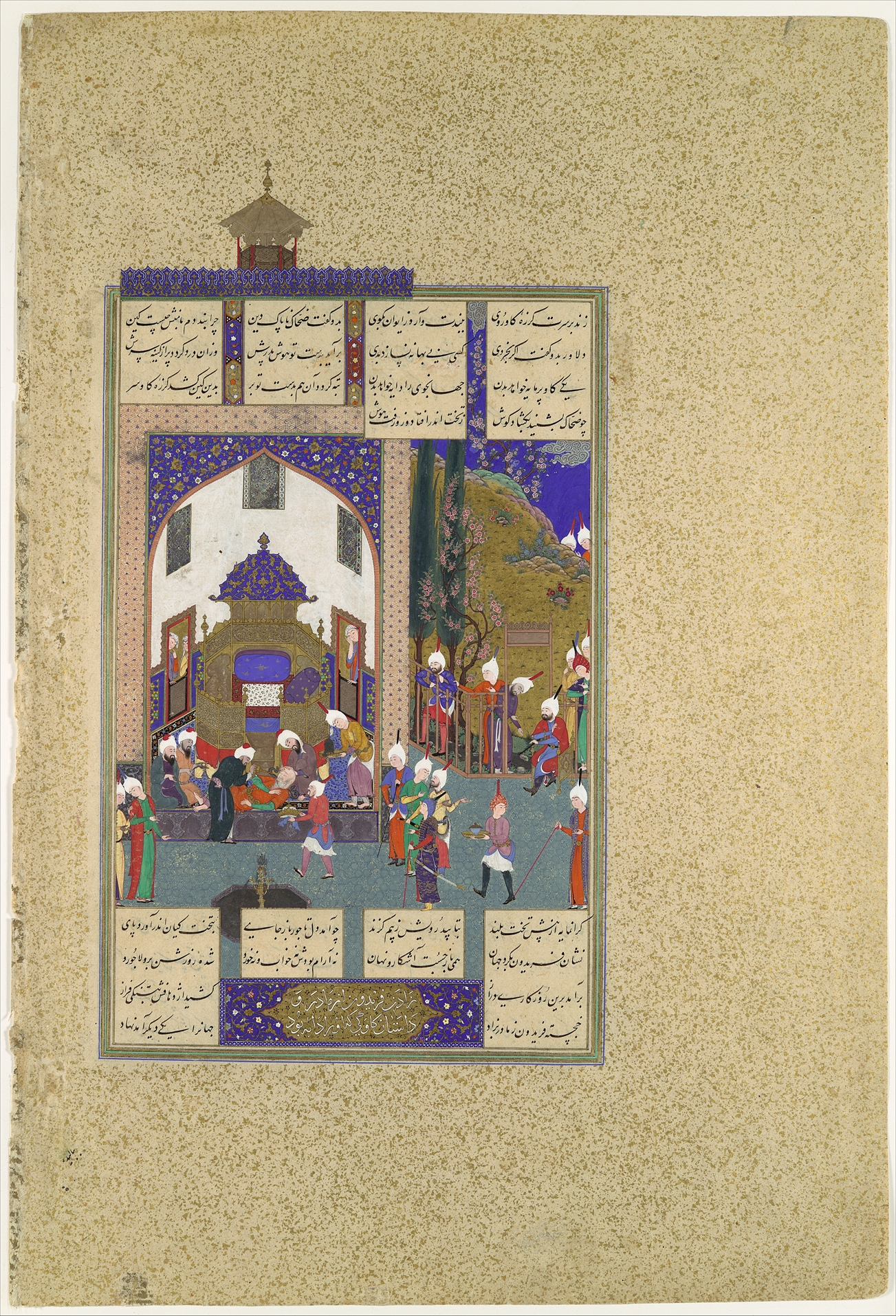
"Zahhak is Told His Fate", Folio 29v from the Shahnameh of Shah Tahmasp; c. 1524; opaque watercolor, ink, silver, and gold on paper; painting is 18.7 cm (height) x 32.9 cm (width), entire page is 31.9 cm (height) x 47 cm (width); the Metropolitan Museum of Art. The painting is attributed to Sultan Mohammad.

== Cartier Hafiz (1531) ==
Around 1531, while at the court in Tabriz, Sultan Mohammed contributed three miniatures to the Cartier Hafiz, a magnificent copy of the Diwan of Hafez. The three miniatures are Celebration of Id, one of the rare miniatures to bear his signature, the Allegory of drunkenness, and also probably The lovers picnicking, which is in the same style.

In Celebration of Id, on the throne, at the feet of the ruler Shah Tahmasp at the center of the composition, Sultan Muhammad added his signature: "The work (amal) of Sultan Muhammad of 'Eraq". Various adjectives fit for a king surround the signature: victory (fatḥ), [divine] assistance (nuṣrat), good fortune (dawlat), triumph (pirūzī), and [long] life (`umr).

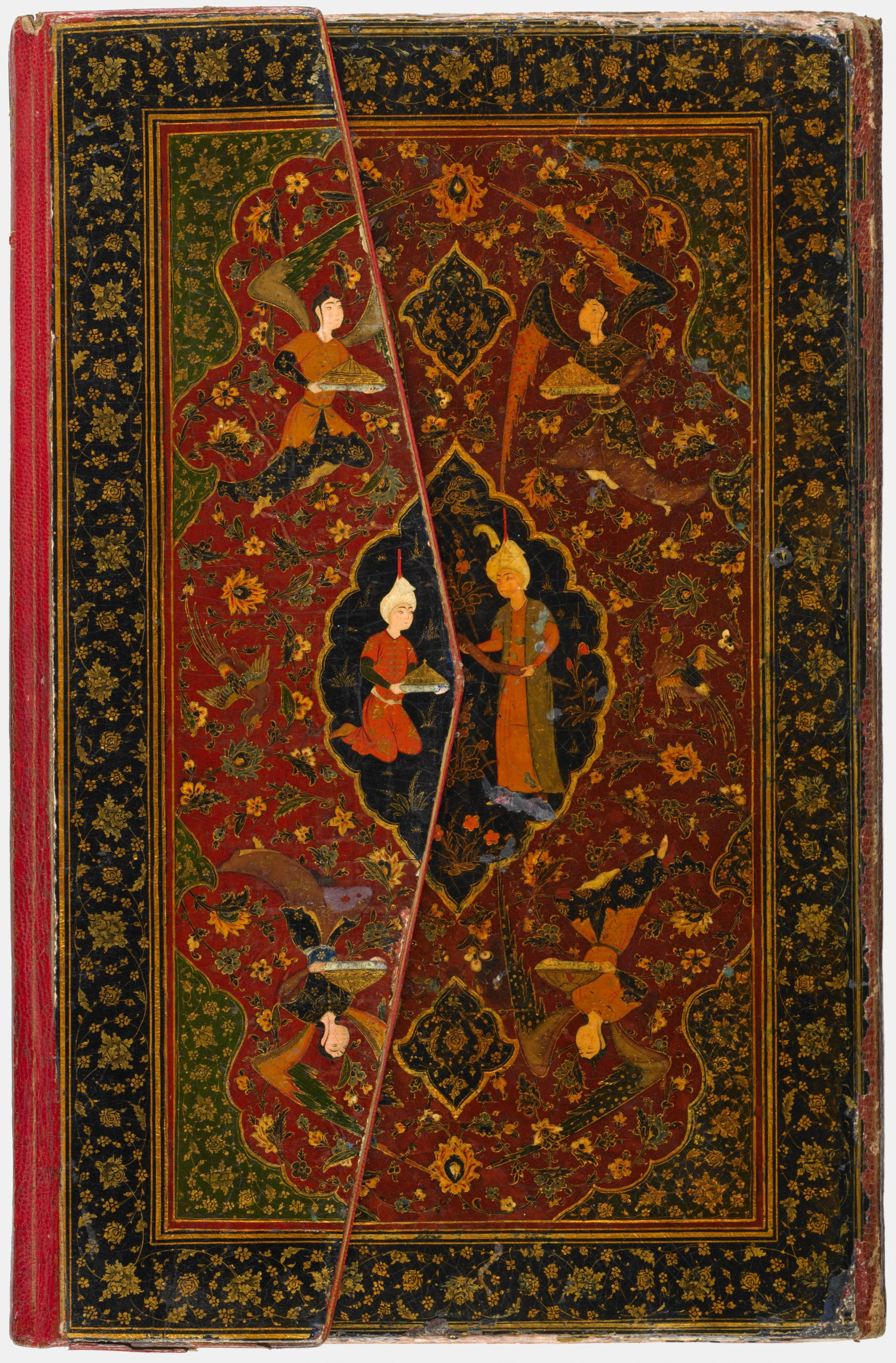
Binding, front cover attributed to Sultan Muhammad

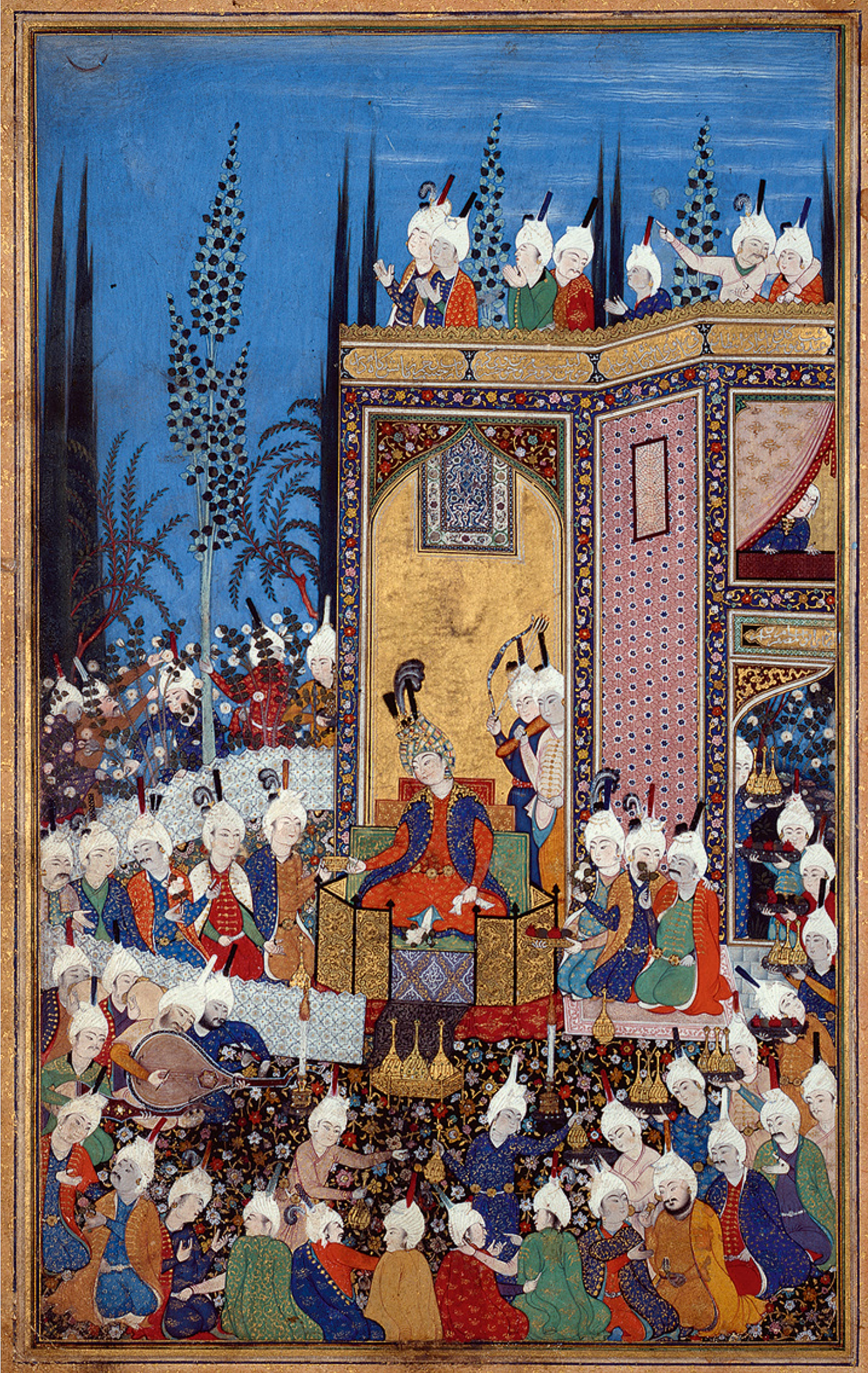
Shah Tahmasp and his court at the Celebration of Id. Cartier Hafiz, circa 1531. Signed by Sultan Mohammad.

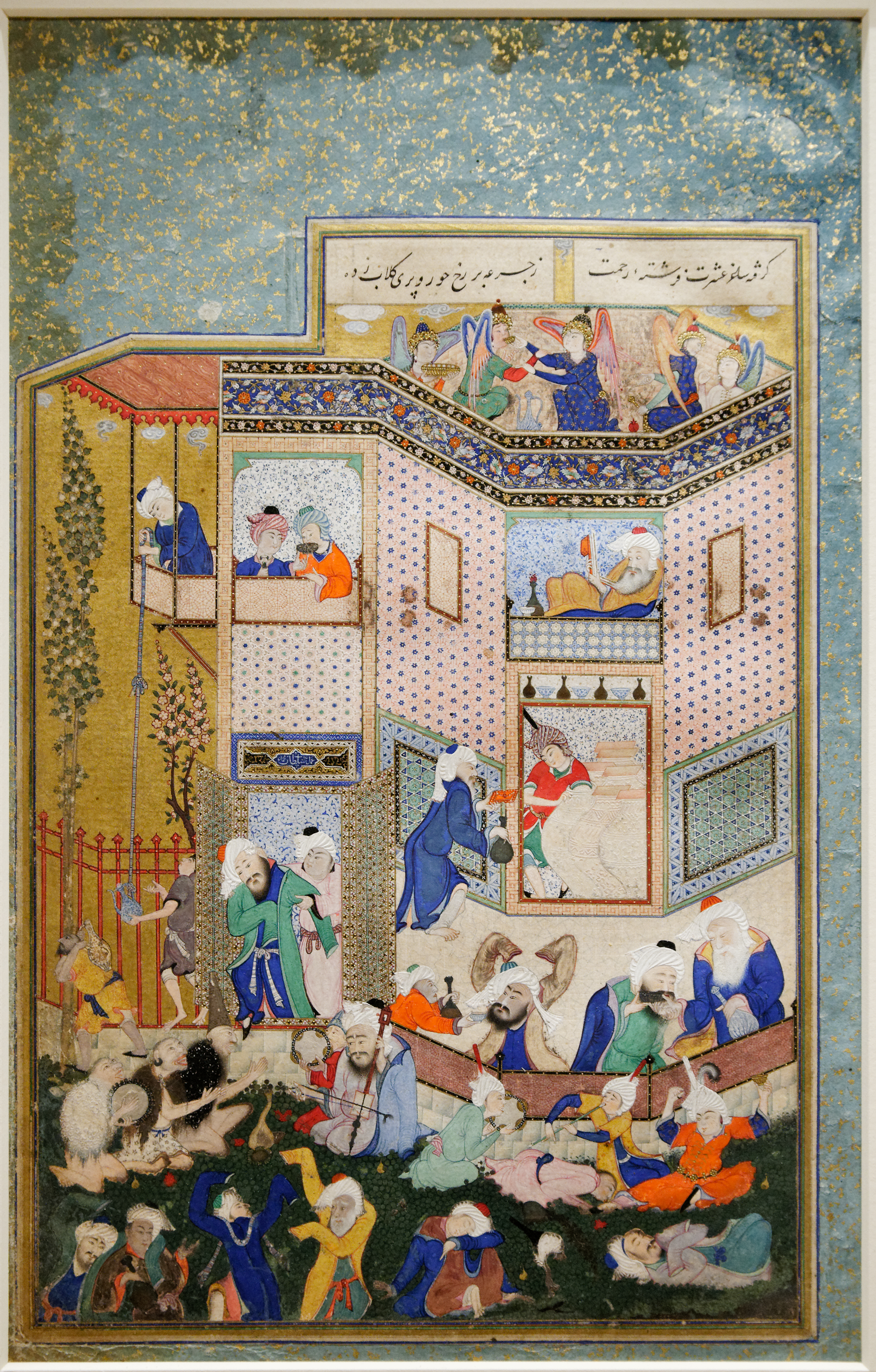
Allegory of drunkenness. Hafez appears in the window over the jars, painted and signed by Sultan Mohammed circa 1531.

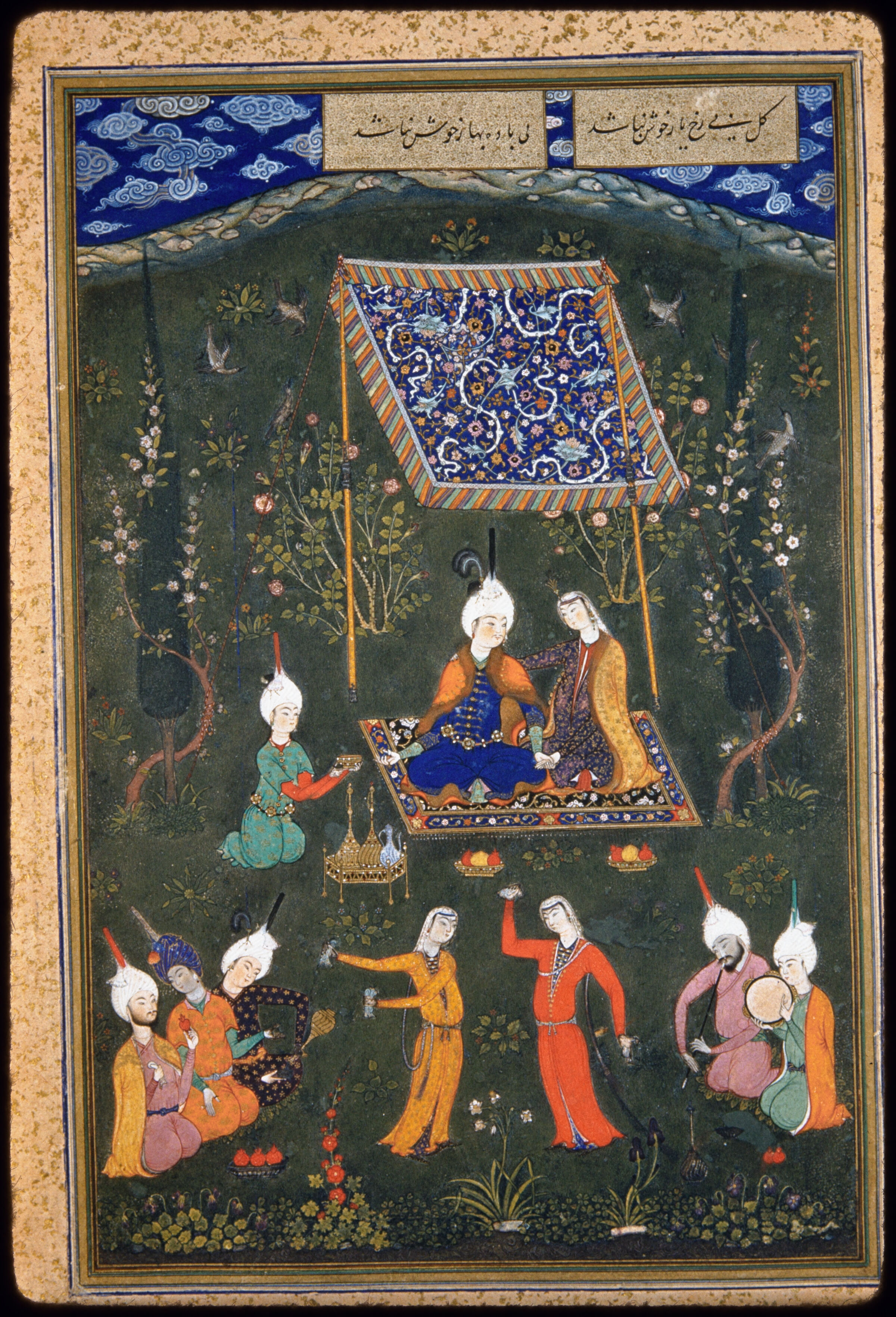
The lovers picnicking, attributed to Sultan Mohammed

== Other works ==
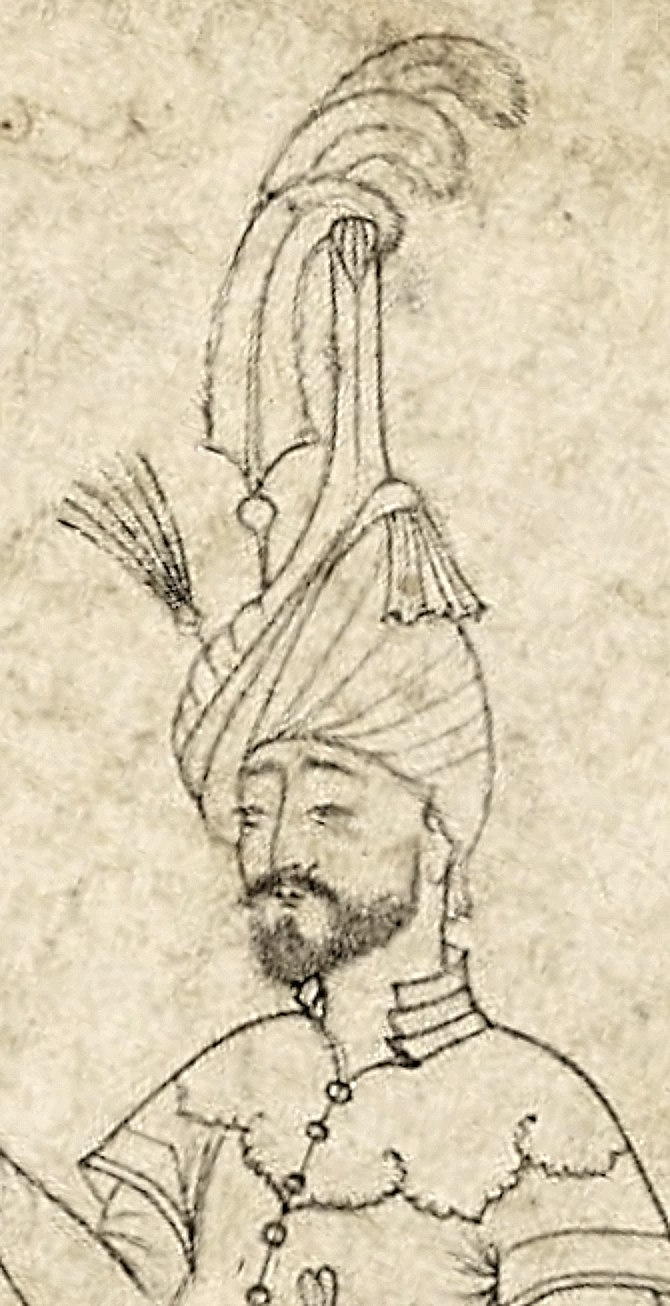
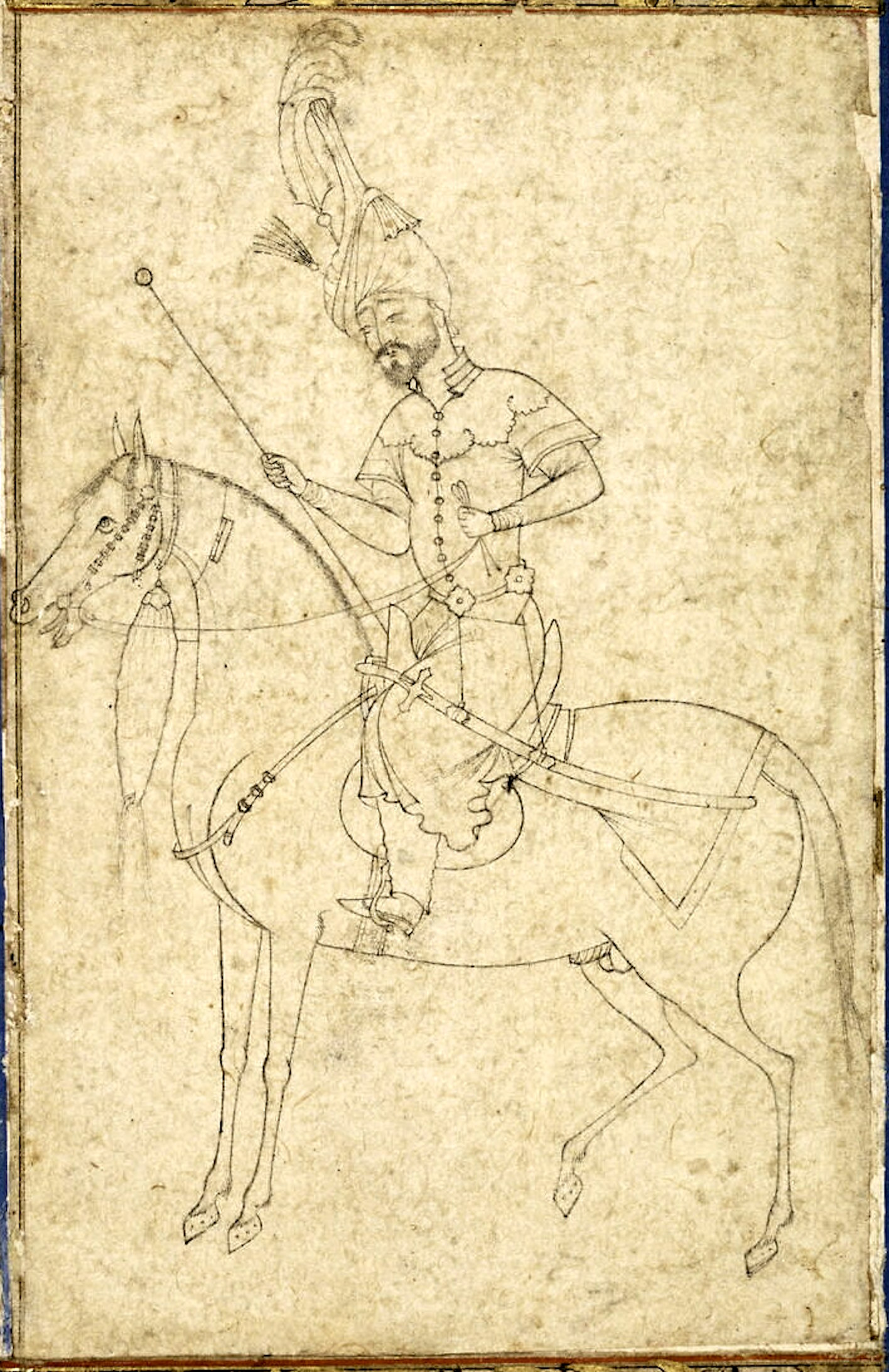
Presumed equestrian portrait of Tahmasp I (1525-1550). Attributed to Sultan Mohammed. Louvre Museum OA 7138.

Sultan Mohammed was also among the few distinguished artists to contribute to an illustrated manuscript of the Khamseh of Nizami that was copied by the scribe Shah Mahmud of Nishapur at Tabriz and produced between 1539 and 1543. Furthermore, he decorated the borders of many other fine Safavid manuscripts.

A presumed equestrian portrait of Shah Tahmasp, now in the Louvre Museum is also attributed to Sultan Mohammed.

== Sources ==
- Blair, Sheila (2014). Text and image in medieval Persian art. Edinburgh: Edinburgh University Press. ISBN 978-0748655786.
- Blair, Sheila S.; Bloom, Jonathan M. (25 September 1996). The Art and Architecture of Islam 1250-1800. Yale University Press. p. 68. ISBN 978-0-300-06465-0.
- Daylami, Malik; Muhammad, Sultan (1525). "Louvre Museum. Portrait équestre présumé de Shah Tahmasp".
- Welch, Stuart Cary (1976). Persian painting: five royal Safavid manuscripts of the sixteenth century. New York : G. Braziller. ISBN 978-0-8076-0812-8.
