= Aqa Mirak =

Persian illustrator and painter (1520–1576)

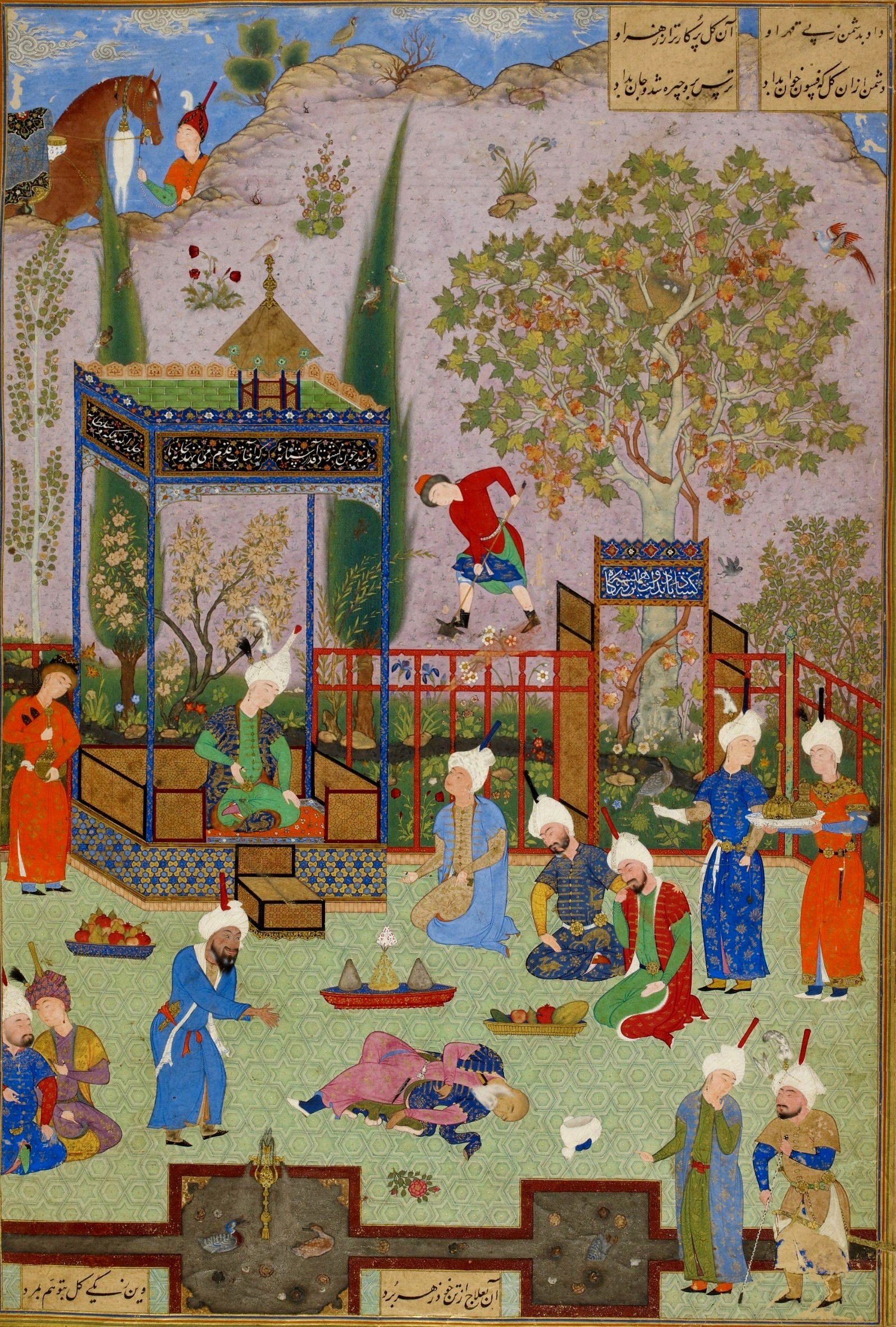
The argument of the two doctors by Aqa Mirak, 1539–43. This is considered an accurate contemporary depiction of Shah Tahmasp I and his court. Khamsa of Nizami, British Museum Or.2265. (Note: "The picture is also rewarding as an accurate description of the costumes, noblemen, and setting at Shah Tahmasp's court" in Welch 1976, p. 76)

Aqa Mirak (Persian: آقا میرک; fl. 1520 – Qazvin, 1576) was a Persian illustrator and painter.

== Life ==
Aqa Mirak was a painter, purveyor and companion to the Safavid shah Tahmasp I and was well known in contemporary circles. Initially living in Tabriz, he traveled and lived in Mashhad between 1555 and 1565, and Qazvin from 1565 until his death.

== Works ==
The contemporary chronicler Dust Muhammad mentioned that Aqa Mirak along with Mir Musavvir did wall paintings for Prince Sam Mirza's palace in Tabriz and illustrations for royal manuscripts including the Shahnameh of Shah Tahmasp, a superb copy of Ferdowsi's Shahnameh ('Book of kings') and Nizami's Khamsa ('Five poems'). Qazi Ahmad wrote that Aqa Mirak "had no peer in artistic design and was an incomparable painter, very clever, enamoured of his art, a bon vivant, an intimate [of the Shah] and a sage". A manuscript of the Khamsa done between 1539 and 1543 has four illustrations bearing attributions to Aqa Mirak. Dickson and Welch have attributed other paintings to Aqa Mirak in the monumental copy of the Shahnameh made for Tahmasp, and have used these attributions to define four periods in the artist's life.

== Style ==
Works ascribed to a youthful period in the 1520s have tautly composed landscapes inhabited by a few large-scale figures. A transitional period in the early 1530s was followed by mature works produced from the late 1530s to c. 1555, in which the compositions are more complex and the coloring more subtle. In the view of Dickson and Welch, at the end of his life the artist returned to his youthful style in two paintings for Ibrahim Mirza's copy of Jami's Haft Awrang ('Seven thrones') produced between 1556 and 1565.

== Gallery ==
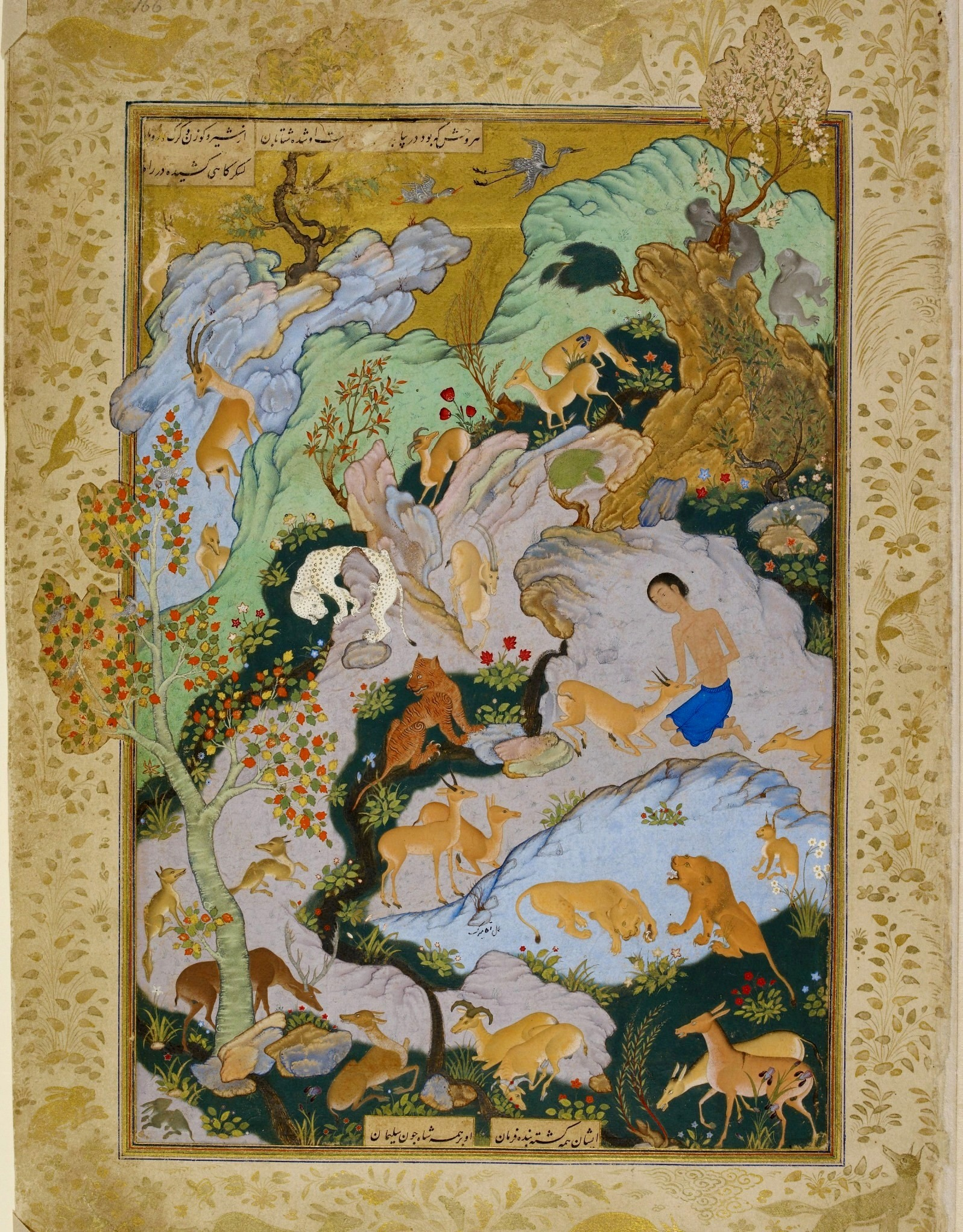
Majnun in the desert from Layla and Majnun (1543–44)

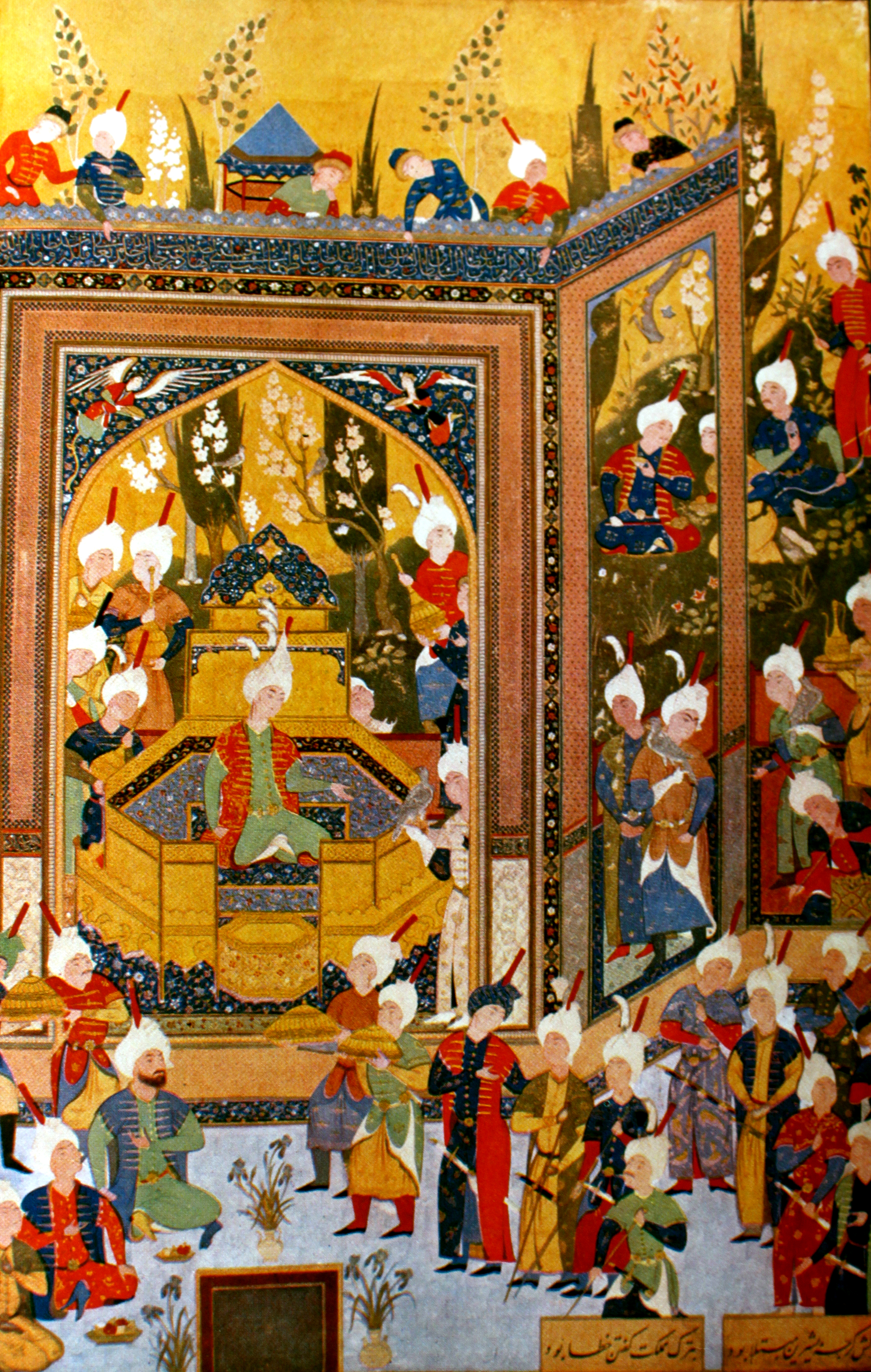

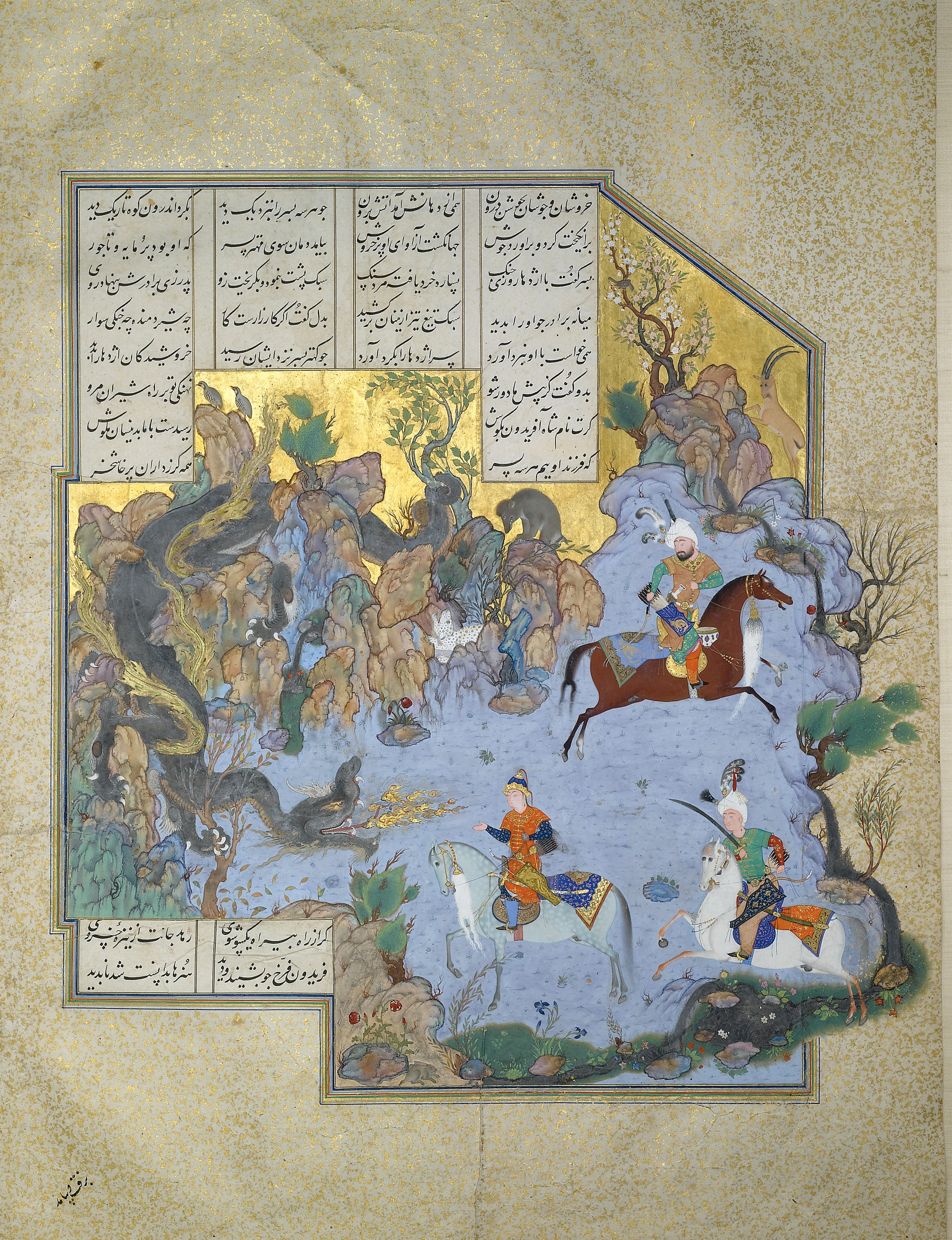
Fereydun in the guise of a dragon tests his sons, from the Shahnameh of Shah Tahmasp, attributed to Aqa Mirak (c. 1525–35)

== Sources ==
- Welch, Stuart Cary (1976). Royal Persian Manuscripts. Thames & Hudson. ISBN 0-500-27074-0.
