= Dust Muhammad =

Persian painter of miniatures, calligrapher, and art historian

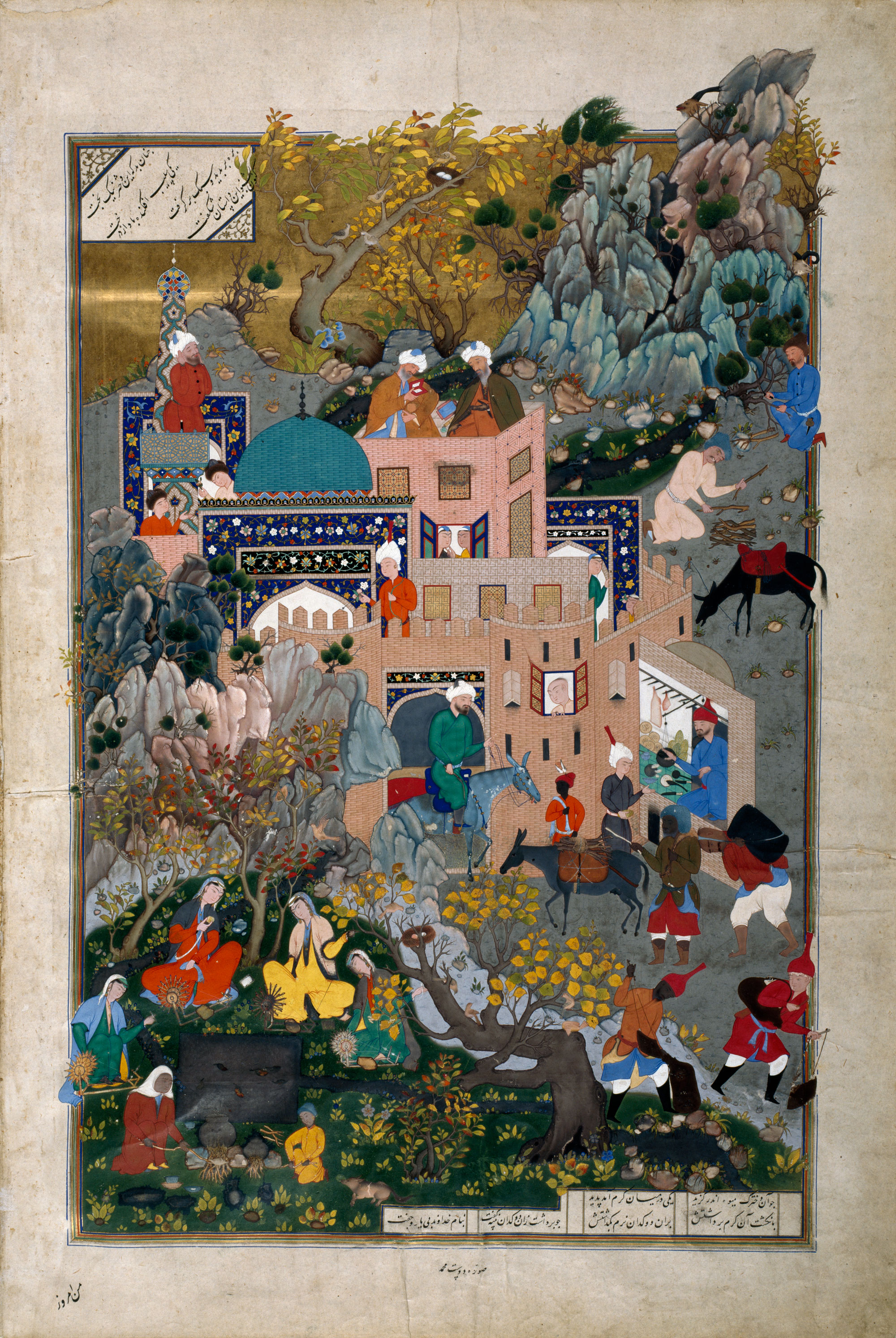
The Story Of Haftvad And The Worm, from the Shahnameh by Dust Muhammad, Aga Khan Museum, c. 1540, from the Shahnameh of Shah Tahmasp

Dust Muhammad, also Dust Muhammad Musawwir or "Dust Muhammad the painter" (Persian: دوست محمد) was a Persian painter of miniatures, calligrapher, and art historian, active from about 1510 to 1564. Apparently a student of Bizhad, he may be best defined as an artist trained in the Timurid tradition, who further developed his style under the Safavids. Later in life he worked in Afghanistan and India, where he was called the "Mani of the Age" by Humayun. He is likely different from Dust Muhammad Haravi, who authored a preface to the Bahram Mirza Album in 1544.

== Early career ==
Dust Muhammad was born in Herat in the late 15th century, although the date is not known. He was a disciple of Kamāl ud-Dīn Behzād, working with teachers in Herat. Prince Bahram Mirza first spotted his talent and invited him to work in his studio. By early 1520 Muhammad moved with Behzad from Herat to Tabriz. After the death of Shah Ismail I, he remained in the service of Shah Tahmasp I, taking part in the illustration of the famous Shahnameh of Shah Tahmasp, however his contribution is much more modest than that of Sultan Mohammed or Mir Musavvir.

After the death of Behzad in 1535, Muhammad left Tahmasp's court. According to some researchers, he was a nomad and he could no longer sit in the same spot.

== Kabul ==
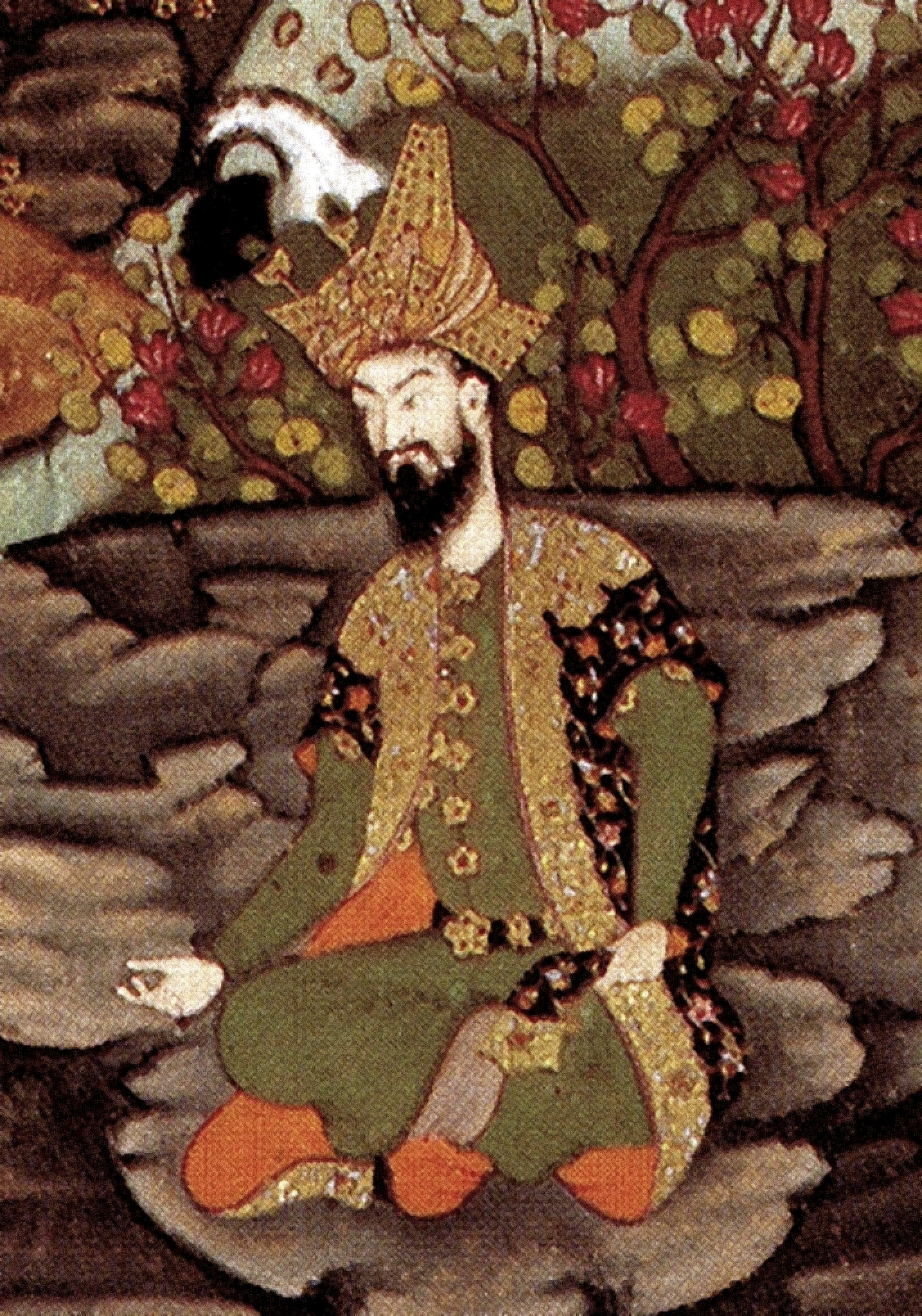
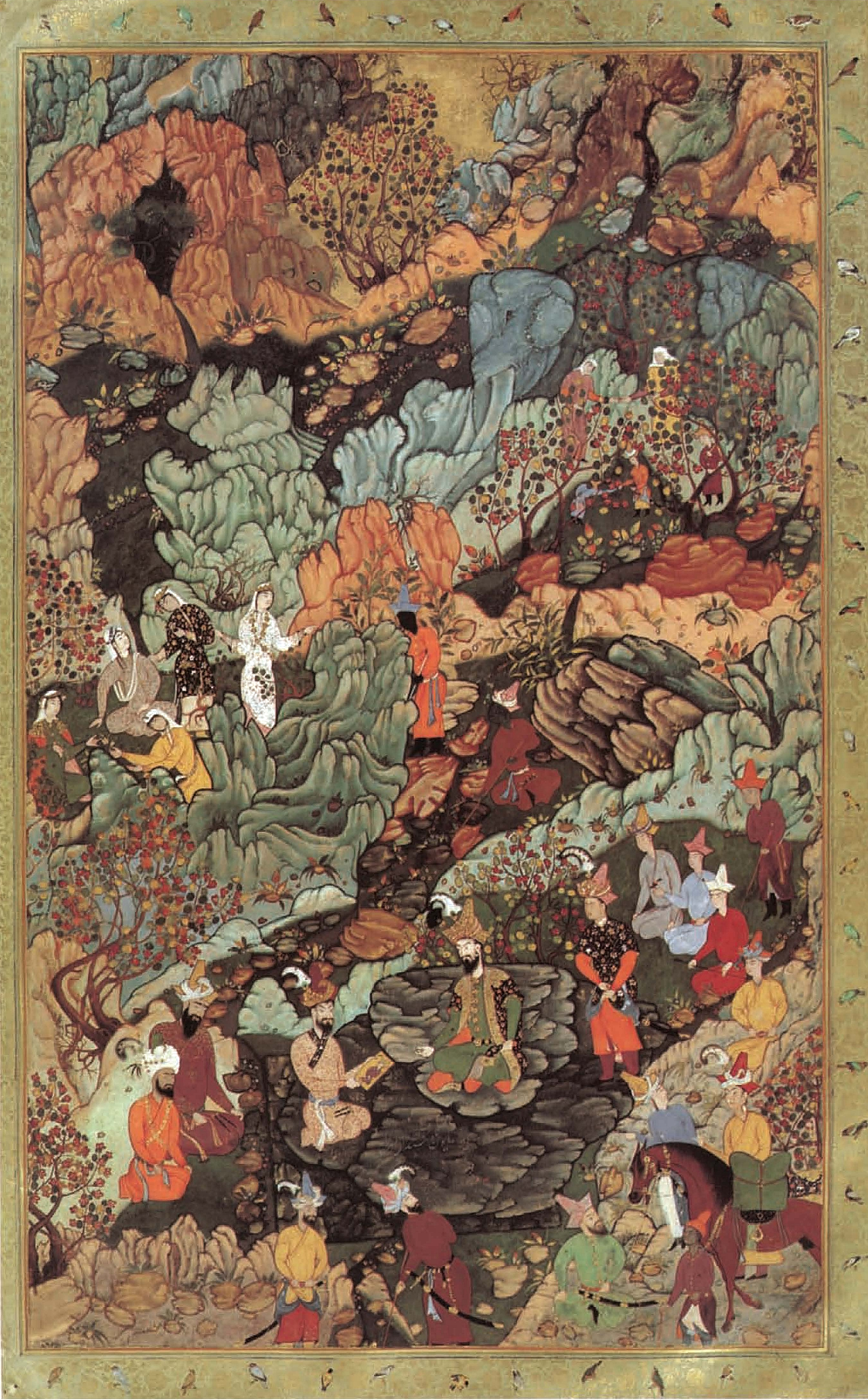
Portrait of Humayun and his brothers, from life, by Dust Muhammad, c.1546, Kabul. Humayun's face was later damaged as it travelled to the India! Art and Culture exhibition in 1985.

In the late 1530s, he worked at the court of the ruler of Kabul, Kamran Mirza, brother of the Mughal emperor Humayun, who was in control of Kabul from 1540 to 1545 and 1547-49.

Dust Muhammad arrived at the Mughal court much earlier than other, younger Safavid artists such as Mir Sayyid ‘Ali and ‘Abdussamad, who arrived in 1549.

Paintings by Dust Muhammad for Humayun are known from around 1545, including the Allegory of the Celebrations for Akbar's Circumcision (1546). The interior of this piece is styled Turkmen Sultan Mohammed. Much of it takes the form of grotesque mountain elephants and other animals (especially loved by Shah Tahmasp). The emperor Humayun sits on a stone throne, and in the distance under the trees play three boys, one of whom is the future Emperor Akbar I.

As of 1552, Humayun, in a letter to Rashid Khan (the ruler of Kashgar), wrote that Dust Muhammad had “long been in [his] retinue” (nisbat-i qidam-i mulāzimat dārad, had been “longtime companion of the ruler”). Humayun was based in Kabul from 1545 and 1555, interrupted by Kamran in 1547-49. Humayun called him the "Mani of the Age" in the same letter.

== India ==
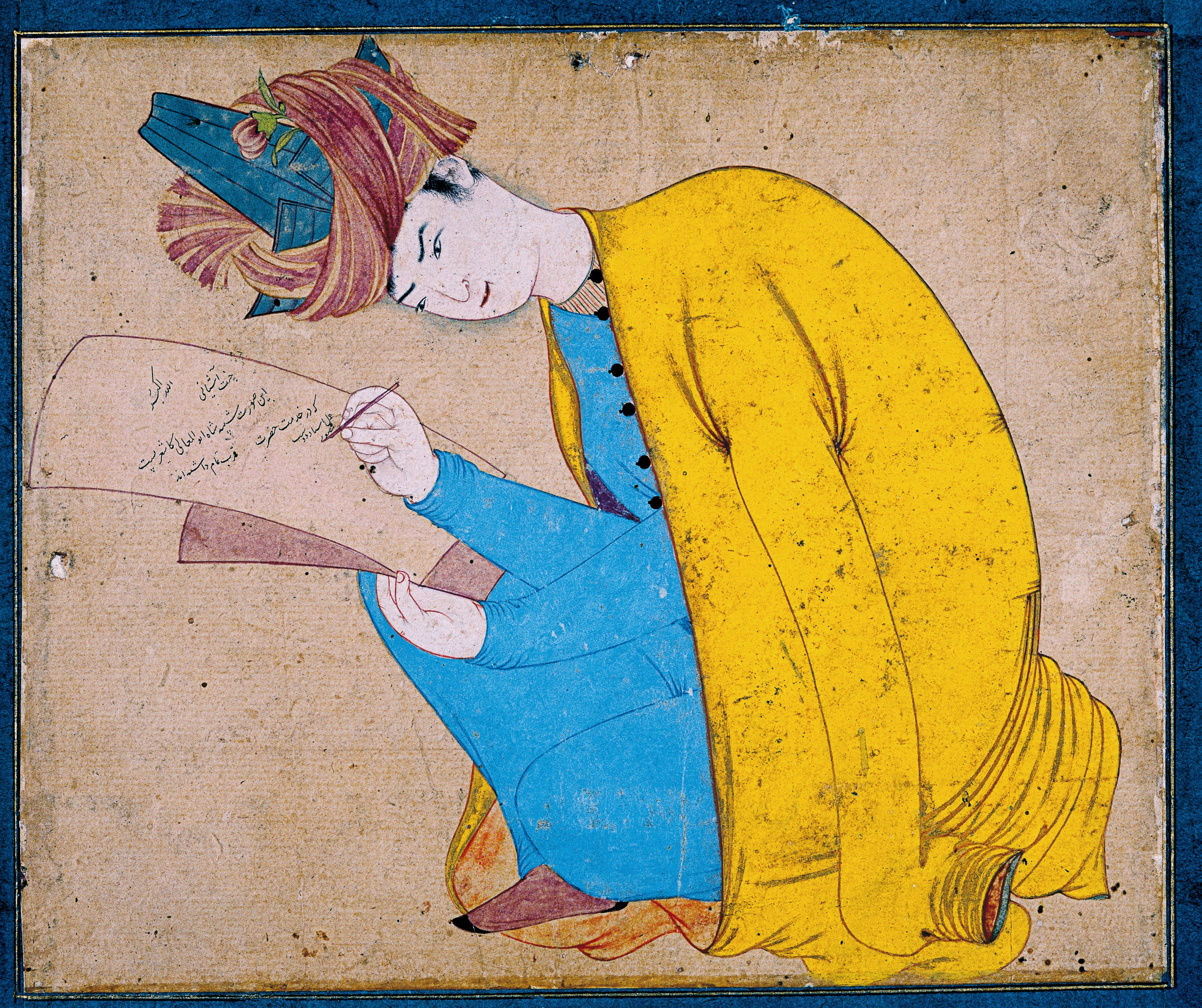
Portrait of Shah Abu'l Ma‘ali by Dust Muhammad, c. 1556. He wears the Tāj-i 'Izzat headdress of Humayun. Aga Khan Collection

In 1555, and at the invitation of Emperor Humayun, he traveled to India. But Humayun died in 1556.

In the early 1560s, the court of the Mughal emperors was already under Emperor Akbar I, and Dust Muhammad left India and returned to Iran. He lived out his last days in Qazvin. The exact date of his death is unknown.

== Sources ==
- Branfoot, Crispin (30 June 2018). Portraiture in South Asia since the Mughals: Art, Representation and History. Bloomsbury Publishing. ISBN 978-1-83860-897-2.
- Dickson M. B. / Welch S. C. The Houghton Shahnameh. - Cambridge, Mass. 1981. - Vol. 1.
- Master the art of art. - M., 1965. - T. 1.
- Weis, Friederike (2020). "How the Persian Qalam Caused the Chinese Brush to Break: The Bahram Mirza Album Revisited". Muqarnas Online. 37 (1): 63–109. doi:10.1163/22118993-00371P04.
- Welch, Stuart Cary. Persian Painting Five Royal Manuscripts of the Sixteenth Century. - New York. 1976.
- Welch, Stuart Cary. Wonders of the Age. - Cambridge: Fogg Art Museum, Harvard University. 1979.
