= Shahnameh of Shah Tahmasp =

Illustrated manuscript of the Shahnameh

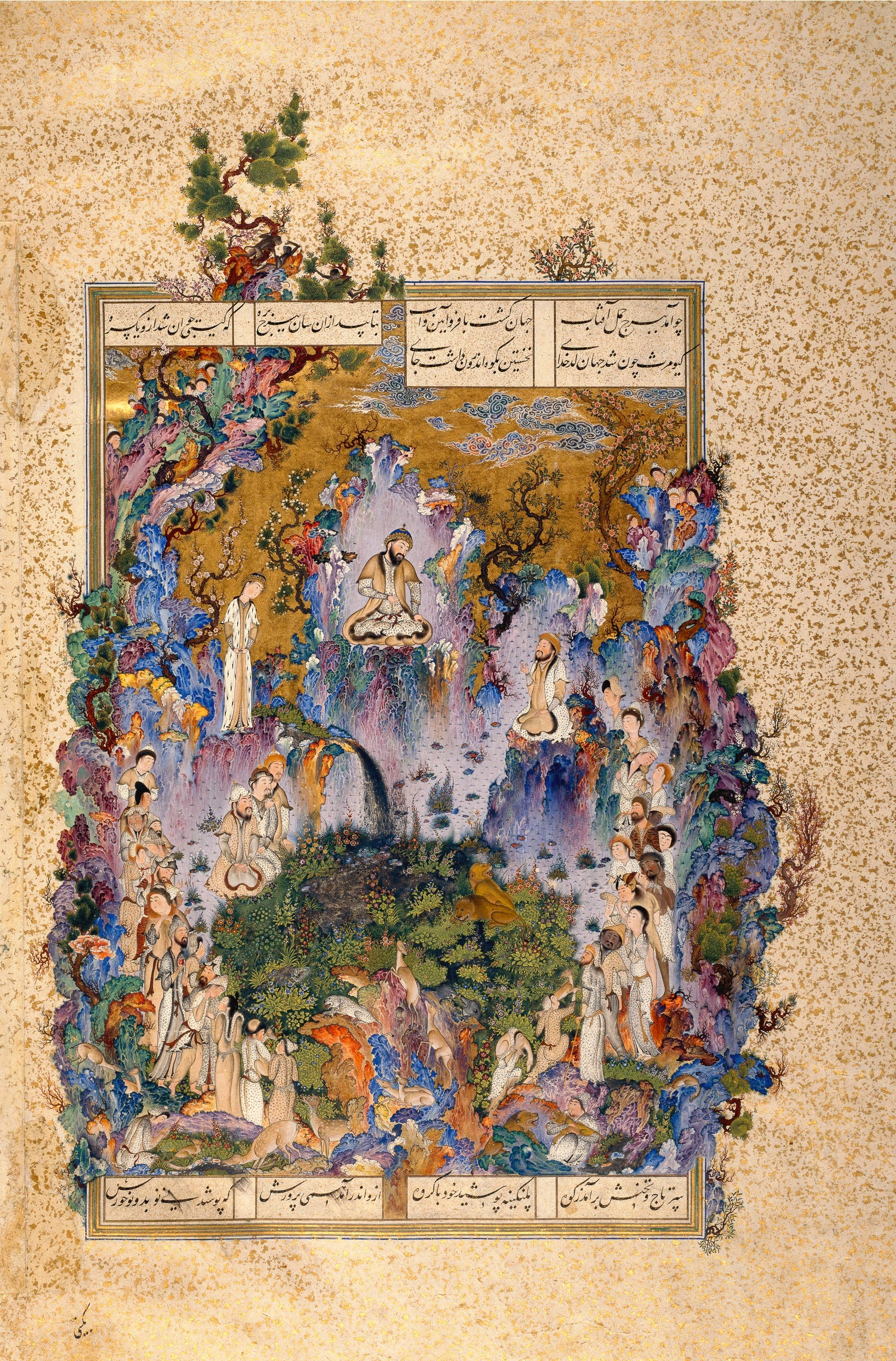
The Court of Kayumars

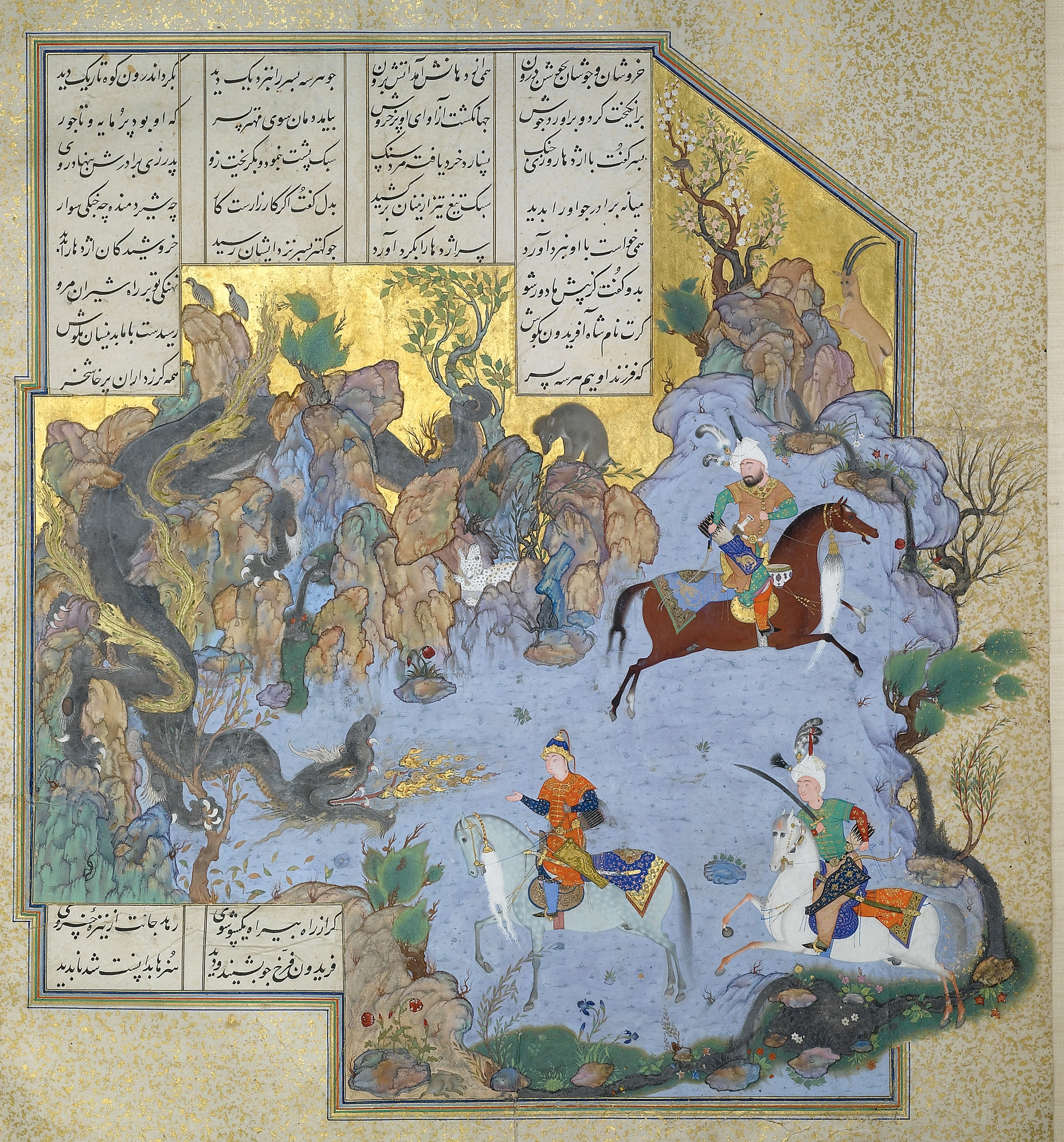
Attributed to Aqa Mirak; Faridun disguised as a dragon tests his sons

The Shahnameh of Shah Tahmasp (Persian: شاهنامه شاه‌طهماسب) or Houghton Shahnameh is one of the most famous illustrated manuscripts of the Shahnameh, the national epic of Greater Iran, and a high point in the art of the Persian miniature. It is probably the most fully illustrated manuscript of the text ever produced. When created, the manuscript contained 759 pages, 258 of which were miniatures. These miniatures were hand-painted by the artists of the imperial workshop in Tabriz under Shah Ismail I and Shah Tahmasp I. Upon its completion, the Shahnameh was gifted to the Ottoman Sultan Selim II in 1568. The page size is about 48 x 32 cm, and the text written in Nastaʿlīq script of the highest quality. The manuscript was broken up in the 1970s and the pages are now in a number of different collections around the world.

== History ==
=== Creation and Years in Safavid Iran (c. 1522 – 1568) ===
This edition of the Shahnameh was created in Tabriz by the order of Shah Ismail I who had recently taken control of the city. Ismail was a charismatic and militarily aggressive leader, which allowed him to conquer large swaths of territory with cosmopolitan populations. Because of this, he had access to a wide variety of artists with many specialties and training in different styles, which allowed for the collaboration of artists and resulted in a new style of illumination later named the Tabriz Style.

He commissioned the most prominent artists of Safavid Iran, to illustrate this manuscript as a demonstration of the shift in political landscape and as an assertion of his dominance as the Shah. A commission of the Shahnameh was a common way to assert legitimacy as a ruler because the text portrays the king as a strong, stable individual who was to be unquestionably obeyed and respected.

Such an expensive and lavishly decorated manuscript would have presented Ismail I as a successful and powerful leader tied to the strength and notoriety of the Iranians. Most likely, the manuscript was either intended to ultimately be given as a gift to Suleiman the Magnificent, sultan of the Ottoman Empire, or perhaps to celebrate the return of his son Tahmasp from a period as governor of Herat. The Shahnameh has been described as a mixture of a mythology and a history of the Iranian people. This makes it comparable to works with similar themes from other regions of the world, such as the Old Testament's Book of Kings or the Iliad.

Although the exact dates are still debated, most scholars believe the work began in the 1520s. It would have taken multiple generations of artists to complete, and many great artists took the position of director, including Sultan Mohammed, Mir Musavvir, and Aqa Mirak. Shah Ismail I died in 1524 shortly after the work on the manuscript had begun. Tahmasp I then succeeded the throne, but at 11 years old was certainly not old enough to recognize the importance of promoting great art and culture in society. Presumably, his advisers pushed for the completion of the manuscript and it was likely close to completion by the mid-1530s during his reign.

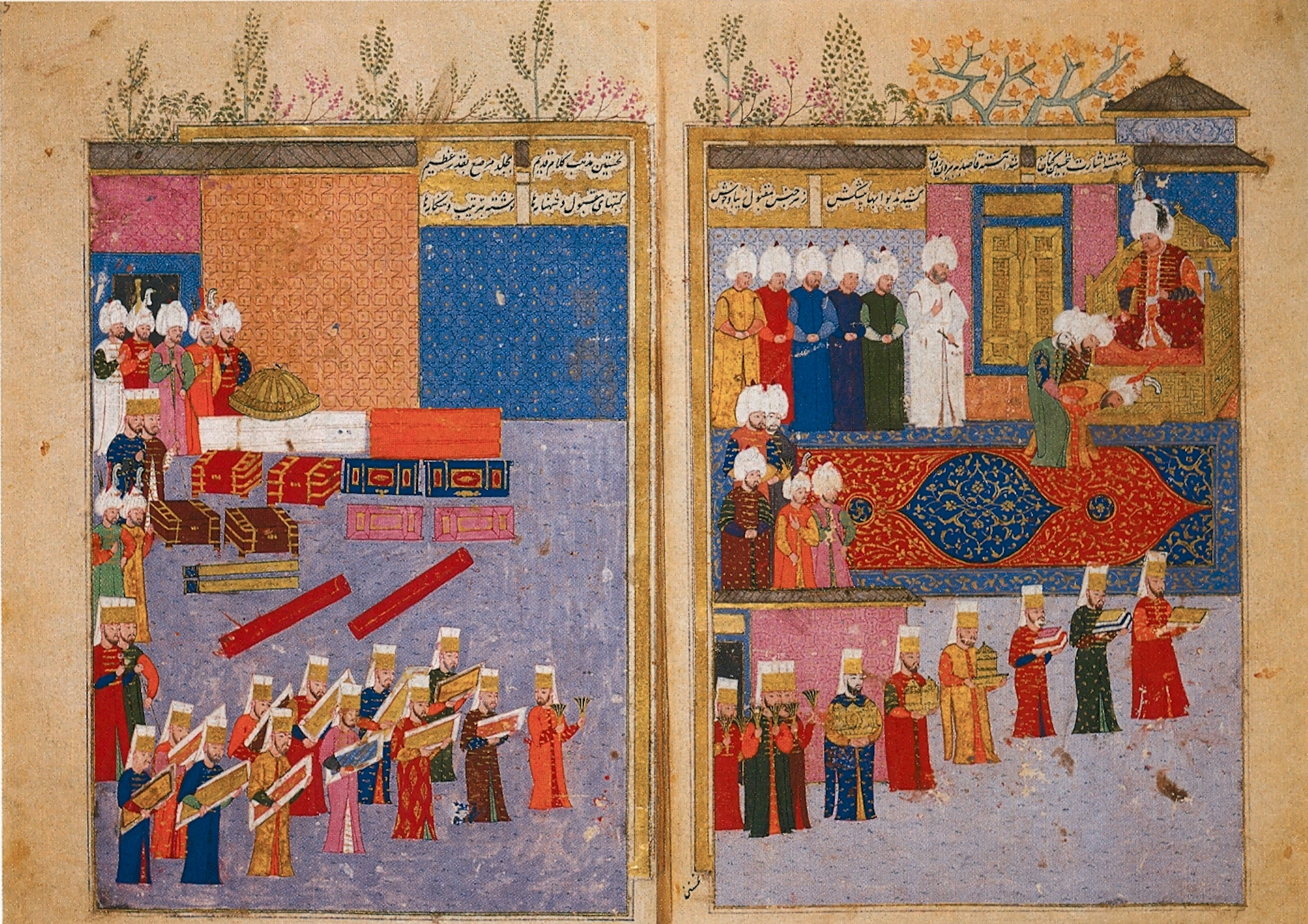
"Presentation of Gifts by the Safavid Ambassador, Shahquili, to Sultan Selim II at Edirne in 1568", including the Shahnameh of Shah Tahmasp. Şehname-I Selim Han, 1581.

=== Under Ottoman Ownership (1568 – exact year unknown) ===
The Shahnameh was finally given to the Ottoman Sultan, Selim II, in 1568. Ottoman sources reveal that it arrived at the Iranian Embassy in February 1568, accompanied by 34 camels and other lavish gifts intended for the Sultan. Both the Sultan and his palace members were impressed with the manuscript, which was estimated to be 30,000 couplets long when it was first presented. It long remained in the Topkapı Palace library in Istanbul, and commentaries added in the margins around 1800 prove that the remarkably decorated manuscript fascinated many rulers and scholars long after its completion.

=== In the Rothschild Family Collection (exact date unknown – 1959) ===
When the Ottoman Empire fell apart in the early 1900s, the manuscript appeared in the collection of Edmond James de Rothschild. It stayed in the Rothschild family and then was acquired by Arthur Houghton II.

=== Present day (1959 – 2011) ===
The manuscript once contained 258 miniatures, but these were sold individually by Houghton to avoid taxes. Houghton kept 118 miniatures for himself, donated 78 paintings to the Metropolitan Museum of Art in 1972 and sold the rest to other privately and publicly owned collections around the world.

After Arthur Houghton II's passing in 1990, his son decided to sell the binding, text pages, and the remaining 118 paintings.

Through complex negotiations with the London art dealer Oliver Hoare, the remains of the manuscript were exchanged with the Tehran Museum of Contemporary Art in 1994 for a Willem de Kooning painting, Woman III. The painting had been purchased by Shahbanu Farah of Iran, but was considered distasteful in the Islamic Republic.

The dispersed miniatures are in several collections, including the Khalili Collection of Islamic Art, which holds 10 folios.

On 6 April 2011, a page from this manuscript owned by scholar and collector Stuart Cary Welch was sold for 7.4 million pounds ($12 million).

== Miniatures ==
The huge scale of the work, which consisted of 759 pages total including 258 miniatures, would have required help from all the leading artists of the royal workshop. Some of the artists identified are Mir Sayyid Ali, Sultan Mohammed, Mirza Ali (son of Sultan Mohammed) Aqa Mirak, Mir Musavvir, Dust Muhammad, and likely Abd al-Samad. A number of artists have been identified from their style by scholars, but are not known by name. Each page size is about 48 x 32 cm with text written in quality Nastaʿlīq script. The style of the miniatures varies considerably, though the quality is consistently high.

Although many of the miniatures have mythical motifs, they also depict everyday objects that would have been common in the Safavid period in Iran. This makes the miniatures unique to a specific time and place. The manuscript shows the fusion of the styles of the schools of Herat, where the Timurid royal workshops had developed a style of classical restraint and elegance, and the painters of Tabriz, whose style was more expressive and imaginative. Tabriz was the former capital of the Turkmen rulers, successively of the Kara Koyunlu and Ağ Qoyunlu, who had ruled much of Persia before Ismail I defeated them and began the Safavid dynasty in 1501.

Dust Muhammad wrote an account of Persian painting which mentions the manuscript. It is the first of many accounts to single out the Court of Guyumars (illustrated above), which he says is by Sultan Mohammad, whom he refers to as a “zenith of the age." Later scholars have called this miniature "matchless" and "probably the greatest picture in Iranian art." Dust Muhammad's account also emphasizes the astonishing talents of portrait artists Aqa Mirak and Mir Musavvir, who also illustrated the Khamsa of Nizami.

A famous unfinished miniature showing Rostam asleep, while his horse Rakhsh fights off a lion, was probably made for the manuscript, but was never finished and bound in, perhaps because its vigorous Tabriz style did not please Tahmasp. It appears to be by Sultan Mohammad, whose later works in the manuscript show a style adapted to the court style of Kamāl ud-Dīn Behzād. It is now in the British Museum.

One of the more prominent miniatures, He Kills the White Div, features Rostam killing a White Div (or demon) as part of his journey in rescuing King Kay Kāvus. The colorful foliage surrounding Rostam and the Div is meant to counter to the black void, which symbolizes the Div's expansive cave, in the hostile region of Mazandaran, around the two figures.

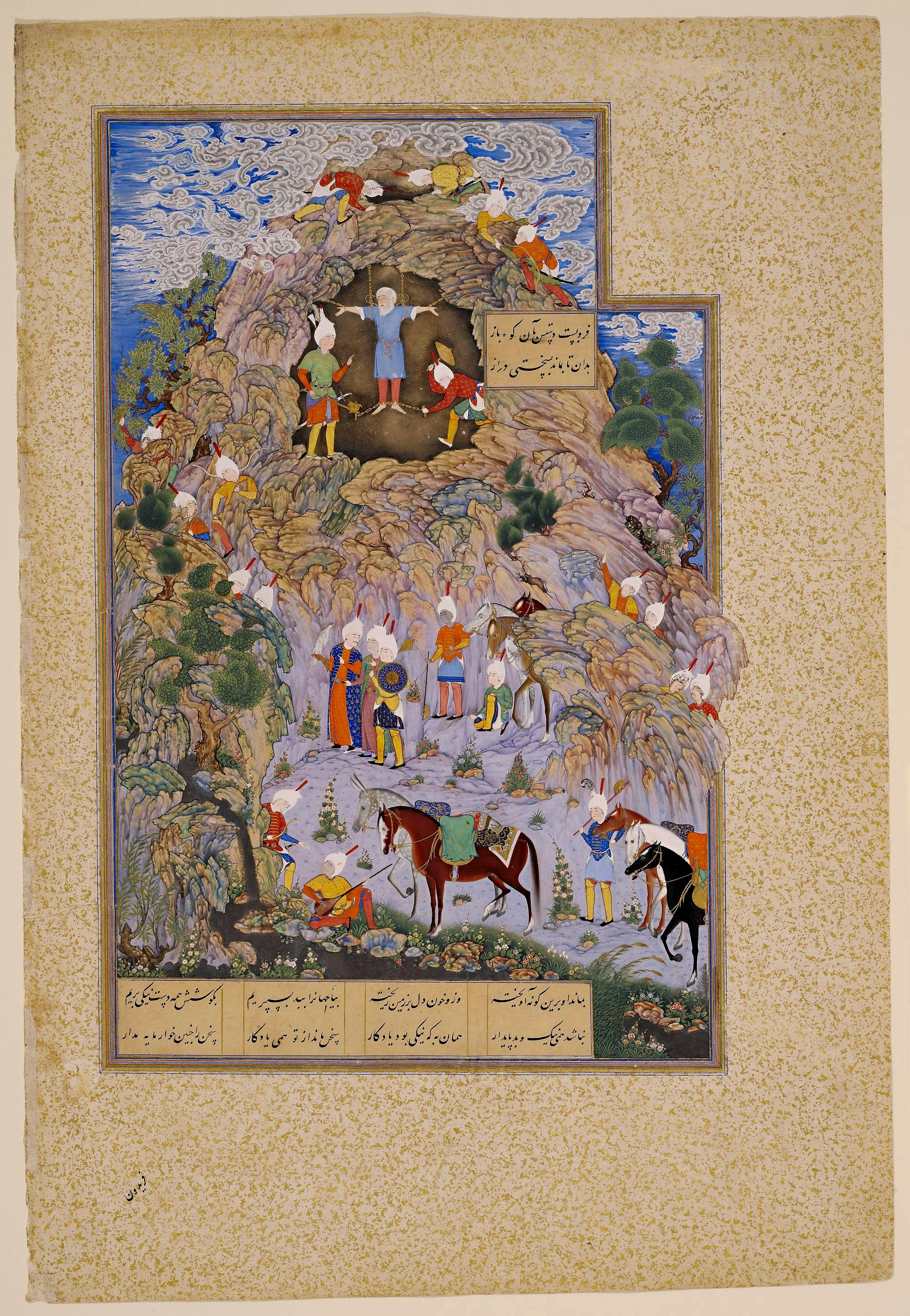
The Death of Zahhak, fol. 37b.

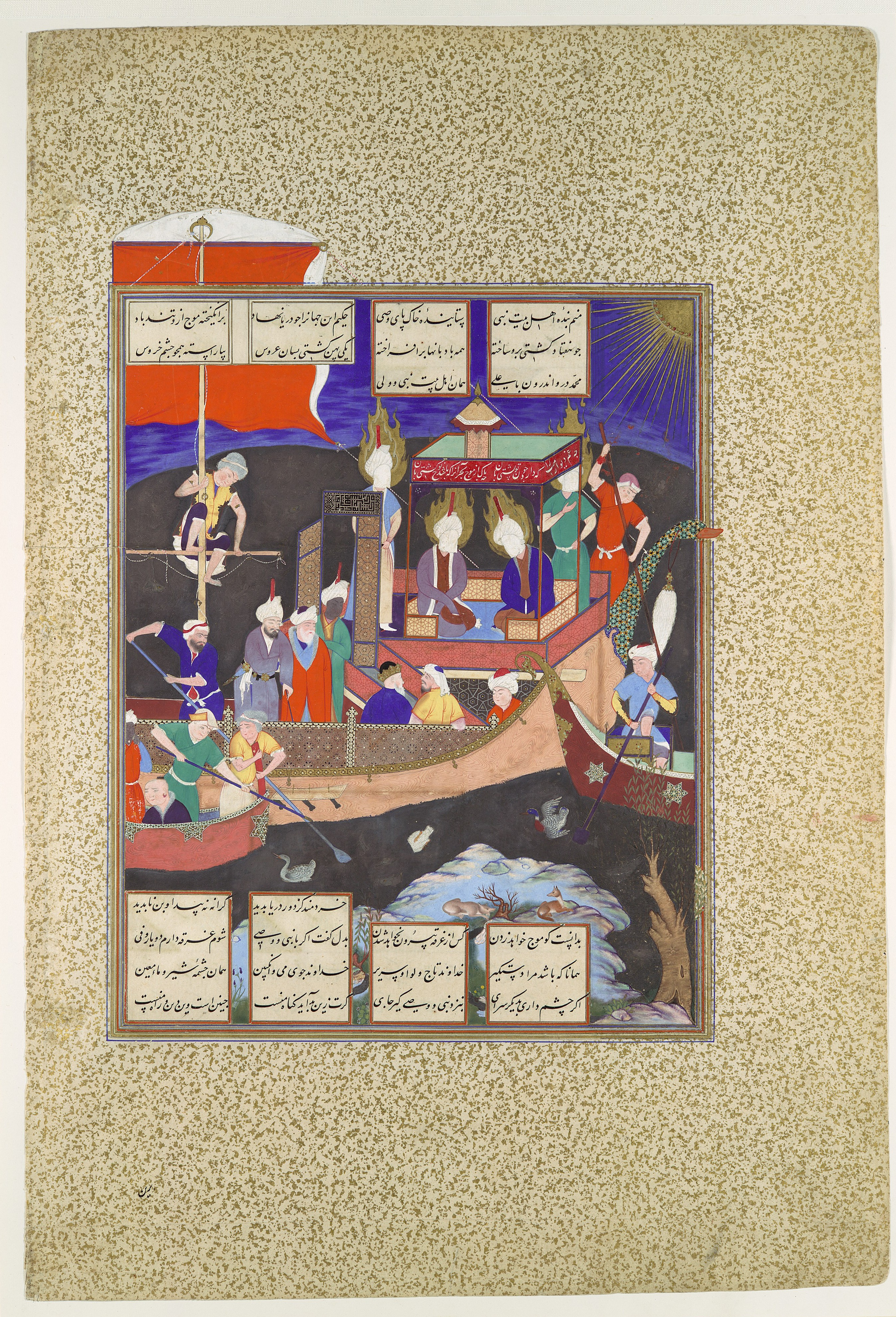
Parable of the "Ship of Fate (Ship of Shiism)", fol. 18v.

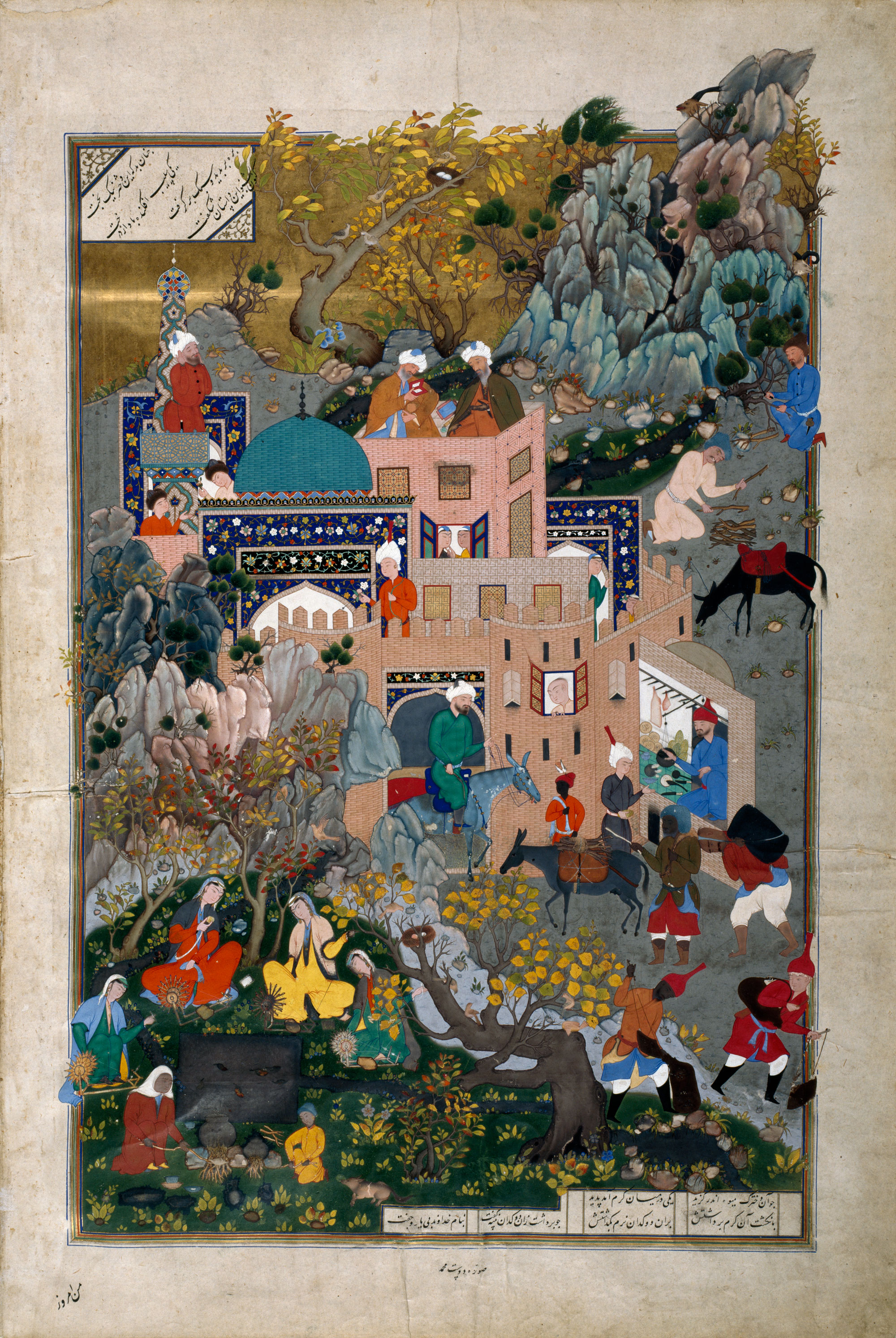
Dust Muhammad, The Story Of Haftvad And The Worm, fol. 521v.

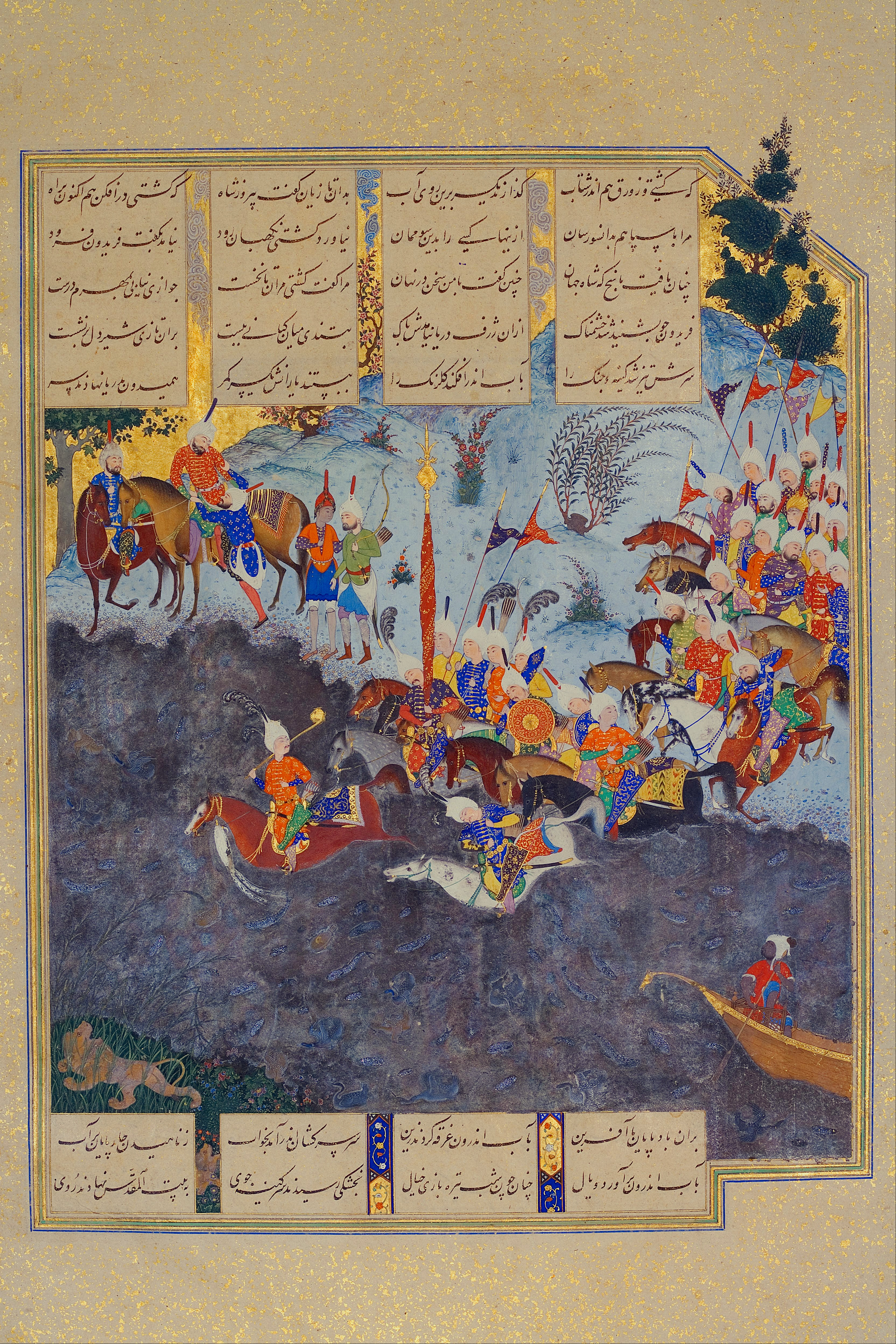
Faridun crosses the River Dijla (Tigris), fol. 33v.

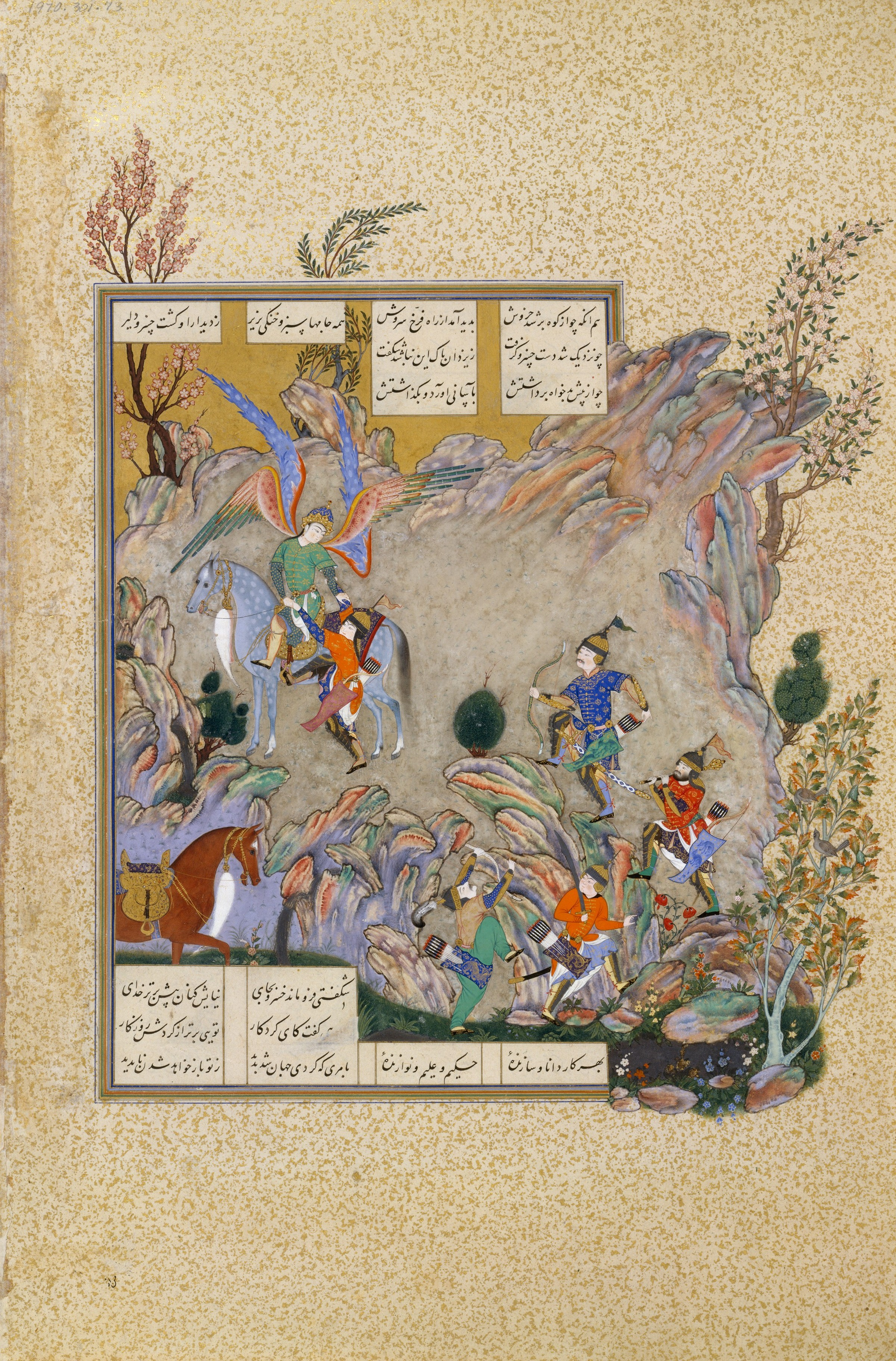
The Angel Surush Rescues Khusrau Parviz, fol. 708v

== See also ==
- List of most expensive books and manuscripts
