= Mir Sayyid Ali =

Persian Artist

- میر سید علی
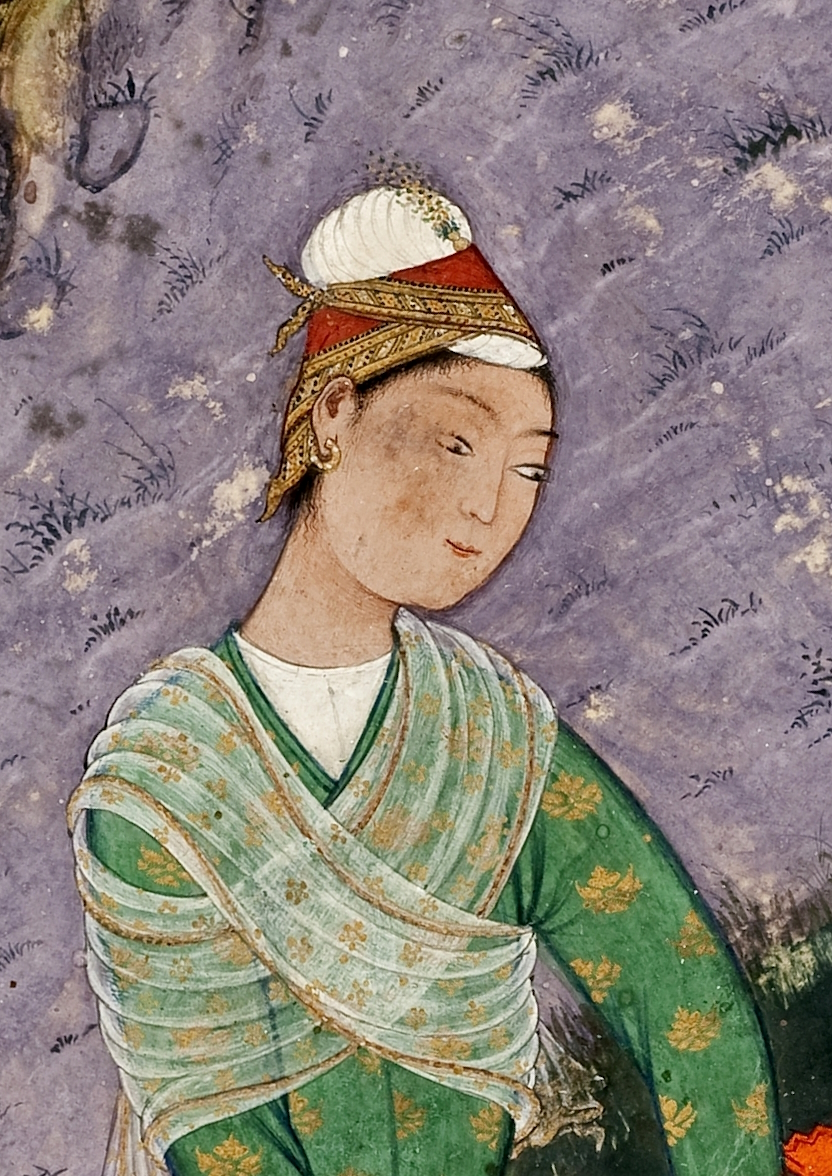
- Self-portrait in Indian dress, signed by Mir Sayyid Ali, Los Angeles County Museum of Art, 1555-56.
- Born: 1510; Tabriz, Safavid Iran
- Died: 1572 (aged 61–62)
- Style: Persian; Mughal
- Father: Mir Musavvir

Mir Sayyid Ali (Persian: میرسید علی, Tabriz, 1510 – 1572) was a Persian miniature painter who was a leading artist of Persian miniatures before working under the Mughal dynasty in India, where he became one of the artists responsible for developing the style of Mughal painting, under Emperor Akbar.

== Family ==
Born in Tabriz, Mir Sayyid Ali was the son of artist Mir Musavvir. Historian and chronicler Qazi Ahmed said that the son was more talented than his father, but the impact of Mir Musavvir did influence his work.

== Early works in Persia ==
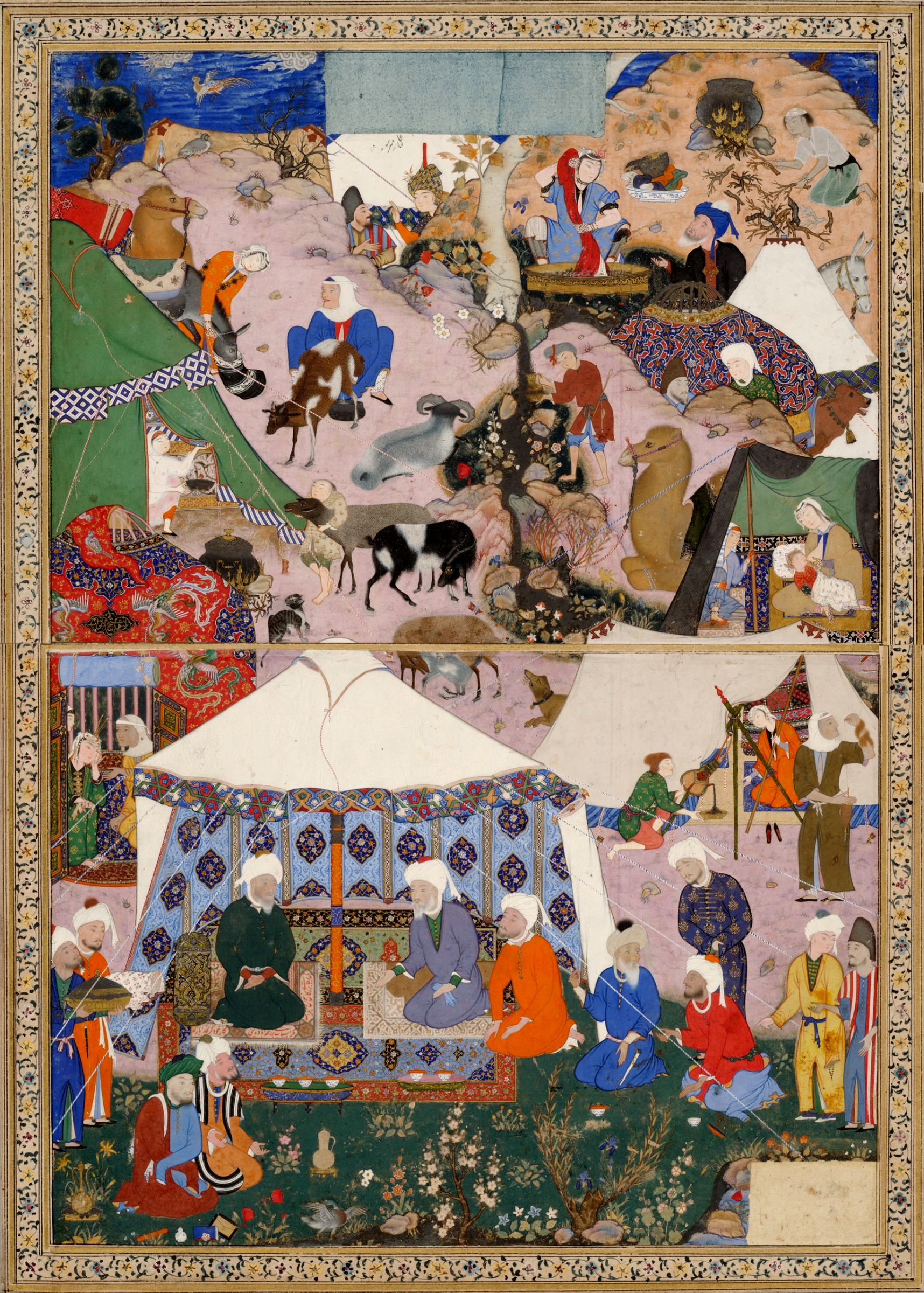
Miniature from Layla and Majnun (c. 1540).

Modern research suggests that Mir Sayyid Ali took part in the illustration of the famous Shahnameh of Shah Tahmasp created in 1525–1548 for Shah Tahmasp I (1514–1576). Two miniatures in it are attributed to Sayyid Ali's. He was also involved in the creation of lavish illustrations for the manuscript of the Khamsa of Nizami ("Five poems") created by the best artists of the Shah's kitabhane in 1539–1543 by order of Shah Tahmasp. Of the 14 miniatures his brush is credited with, four among them including "Layla and Majnun", bears the signature of the artist. The period around 1540, contains two remarkable works of the master: a picture of the elegant young man holding a letter disclosed, and a diptych (double frontispiece) for the Khamsa of Nizami with "Camp of nomads" on one sheet and "Evening Life Palace" (signed) on the other.

=== Removal from court ===
In the 1540s, Shah Tahmasp I became increasingly orthodox and grew to reject artistic representations of living creatures. He lost interest in miniatures, and eventually issued an edict banning secular images throughout Safavid Iran. Artists of his court, including Mir Sayyid Ali, dispersed in all directions. Most took refuge at the court of Shah Tahmasp's nephew, Sultan Ibrahim Mirza.

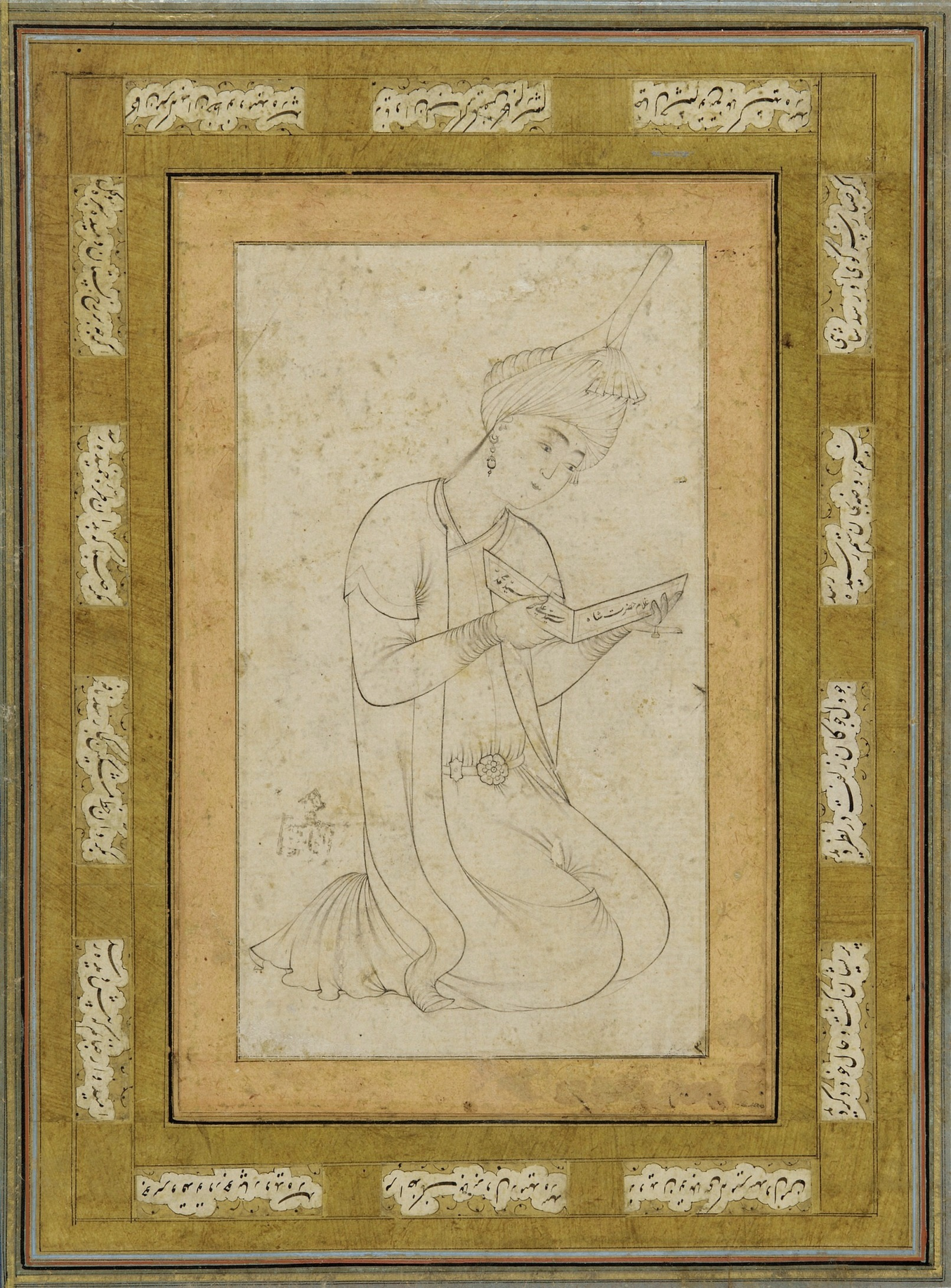
Self portrait.

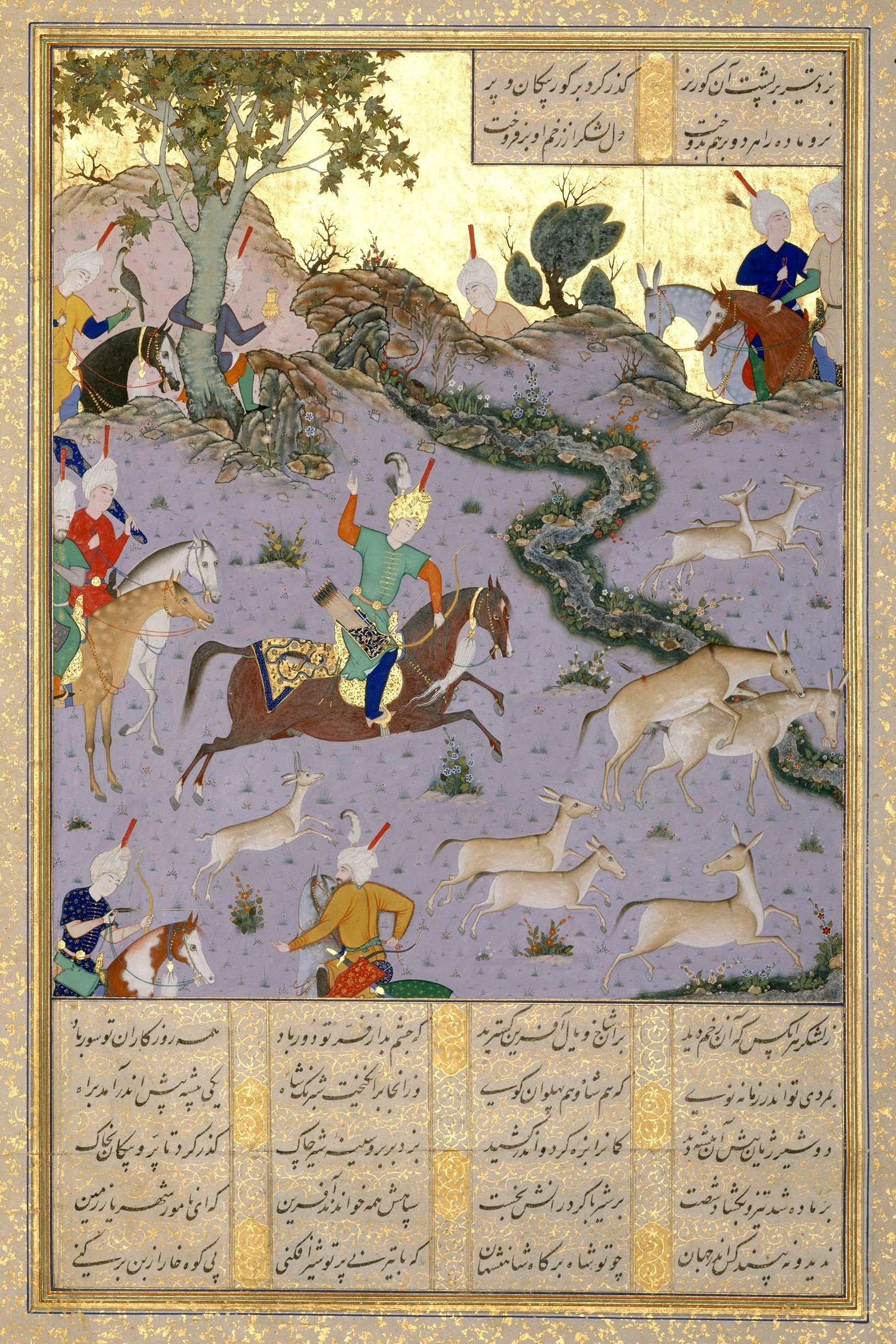
Bahram Gur Pins the Coupling Onagers, Shahnameh of Shah Tahmasp, 1530–35

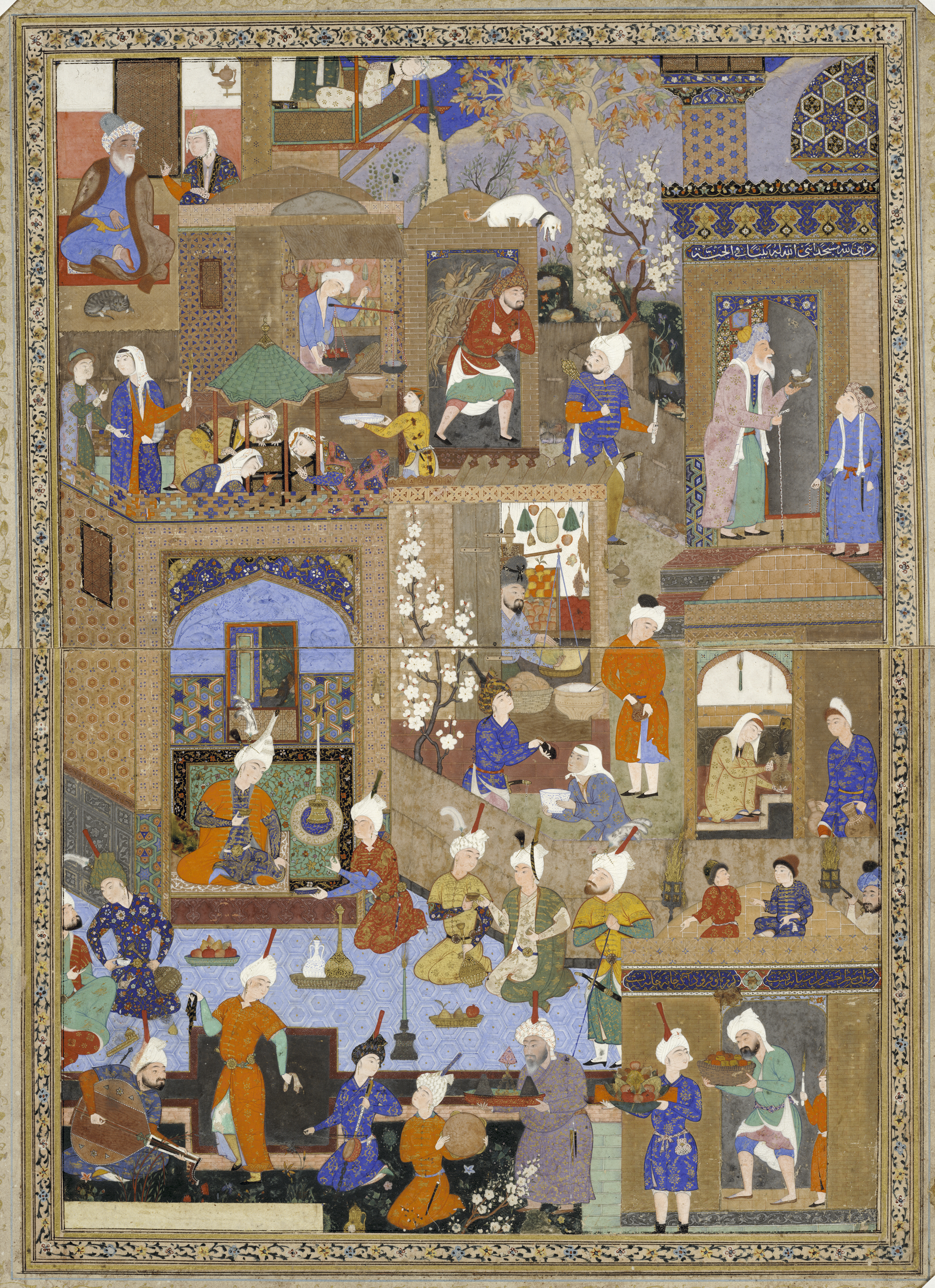
Nighttime in a City, signed by Mir Sayyid Ali, circa 1540, Tabriz (Sackler Museum, 1958.76)

== Humayun service ==
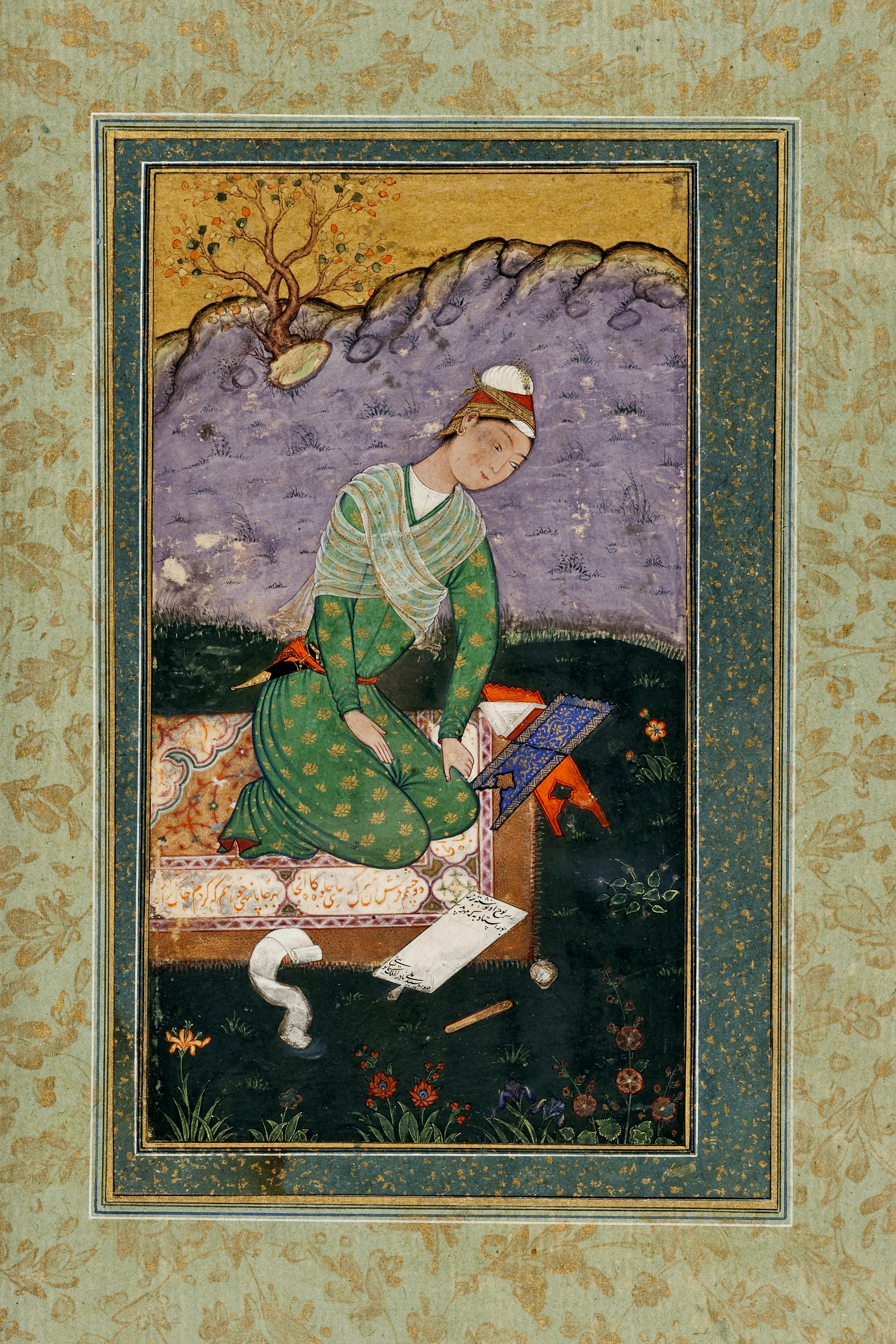
Self-portrait in Indian dress, signed by Mir Sayyid Ali, Los Angeles County Museum of Art, 1555-56.

Meanwhile, the Mughal Emperor Humayun after unsuccessful battles with Sher Shah Suri, lost his throne, and in 1543 arrived in Iran, where Shah Tahmasp gave him a warm welcome and the highest protection. Followed by countless feasts on which Tahmasp persuaded the Sunni Humayun to go to the Shiite faith. While Humayun was staying in Tabriz, he became acquainted with the artists, was fascinated by their works, and two of them were invited to come under his service, as he wanted to create a library-like master of Tabriz. These artists were Abd al-Samad and Mir Musavvir. However, for some reason, instead of Mir Musavvir, the service went to his son Mir Sayyid Ali.

Humayun did not immediately regain his possessions in the Indian subcontinent. While this struggle took place, he was in his Kabul court where the Persian painter Dust Muhammad has been officiating since the late 1530s. Mir Sayyid Ali arrived there in 1549, lived and worked there for as long as the summer of 1555 Humayun's army defeated in a battle the troops of Sikandar Shah. The Delhi gate was open, and his father Humayun regained the throne. The period of the artist's life in Kabul today carries very few works, among them "Portrait of a young writer". Mir Sayyid Ali is considered a master of the genre of portraiture, but Persian portraits were to a large extent conditioned and idealized character than were significantly different from the Mughal portrait, which was much more naturalistic. However, the "Portrait of a young writer" belongs to the best Persian portrait miniatures. Experts from the Los Angeles Museum believe that this may be a self-portrait of the artist.

== Service under Akbar ==
The Emperor Humayun was succeeded by Emperor Akbar, who was an even more passionate lover of portrait miniatures than his father. Mir Sayyid Ali, along with Abd al-Samad from childhood had taught the art of drawing to the future sultan, and between them established warm relations. Sayyid Ali headed the imperial court art initiatives, and under his leadership began one of the most ambitious projects in the book of world history – the Akbar Hamzanama, an illustrated copy of the Persian epic of Amir Hamza, the uncle of the prophet Muhammad. The order, which was implemented from 1562 to 1577, was made by Emperor Akbar, and was launched under the leadership of Mir Sayyid Ali. It was completed under the supervision of Abd al-Samad, who took over around 1572. Mir Sayyid Ali may have been replaced for being too slow, as at this point the commission was seven years old and only four of the volumes were complete. Under Samad's direction the remaining ten volumes were completed in another seven years. The book was divided into 14 volumes, each of which contained 100 illustrations, of larger than usual size, in total – 1,400 miniatures. About 140 miniatures of the works have survived, which are scattered in various museums and collections around the world.

Both the heads of the imperial court workshop essentially supervised the work of others, and it is uncertain whether Samad painted any of miniatures himself, though he may have done or corrected much of the underdrawing. But one miniature, "Elijah the prophet rescues drowning Nur ad-Dahr," is credited to Mir Sayyid Ali. Along with the portrait of his father, Mir Musavvir, and the "Wise men, reflecting on the book", this shows his late style.

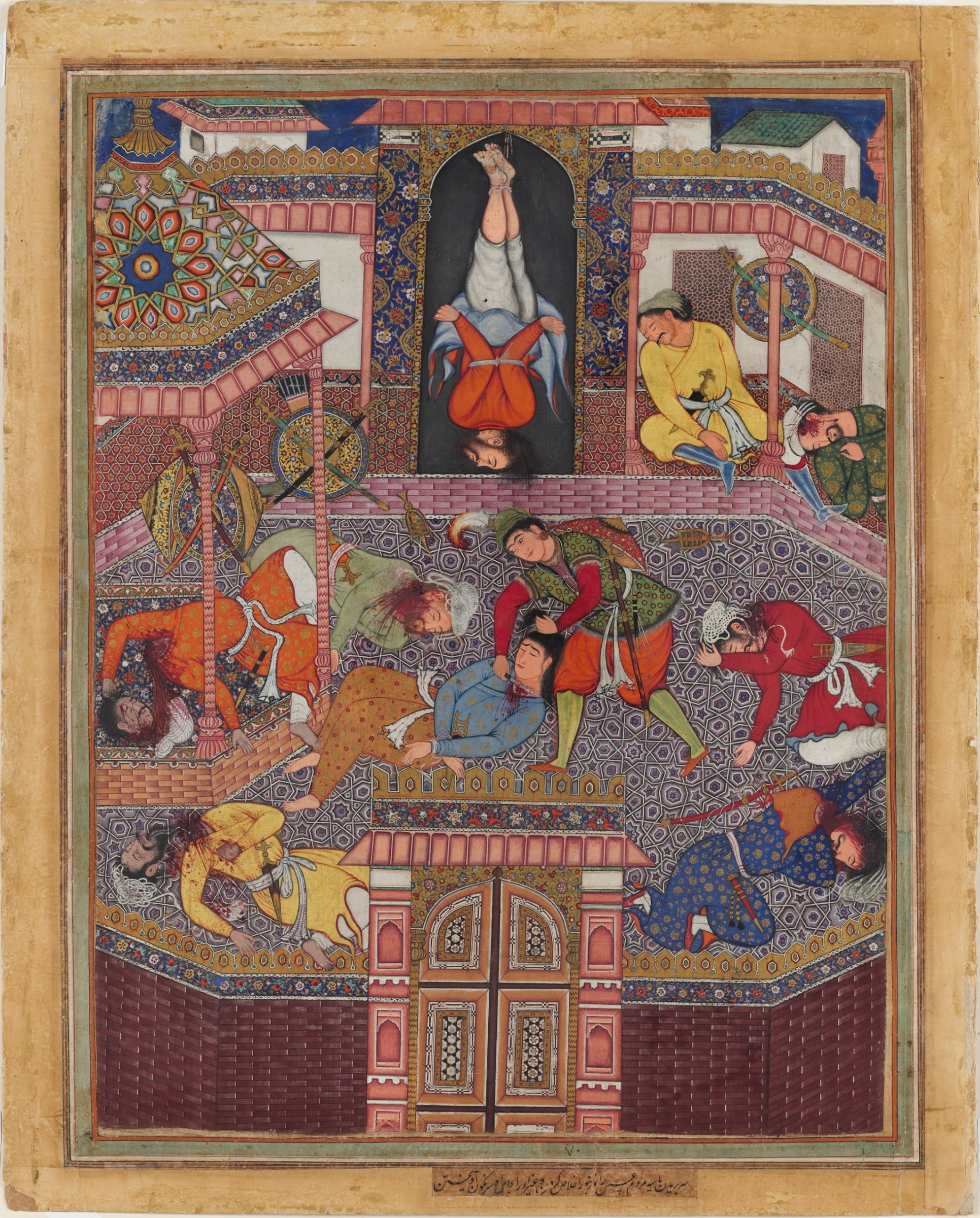
Mahiya frees Zambur, Beheads his sleeping guards, and suspends Gharrad in his stead Hamzanama
Harvard Art Museum

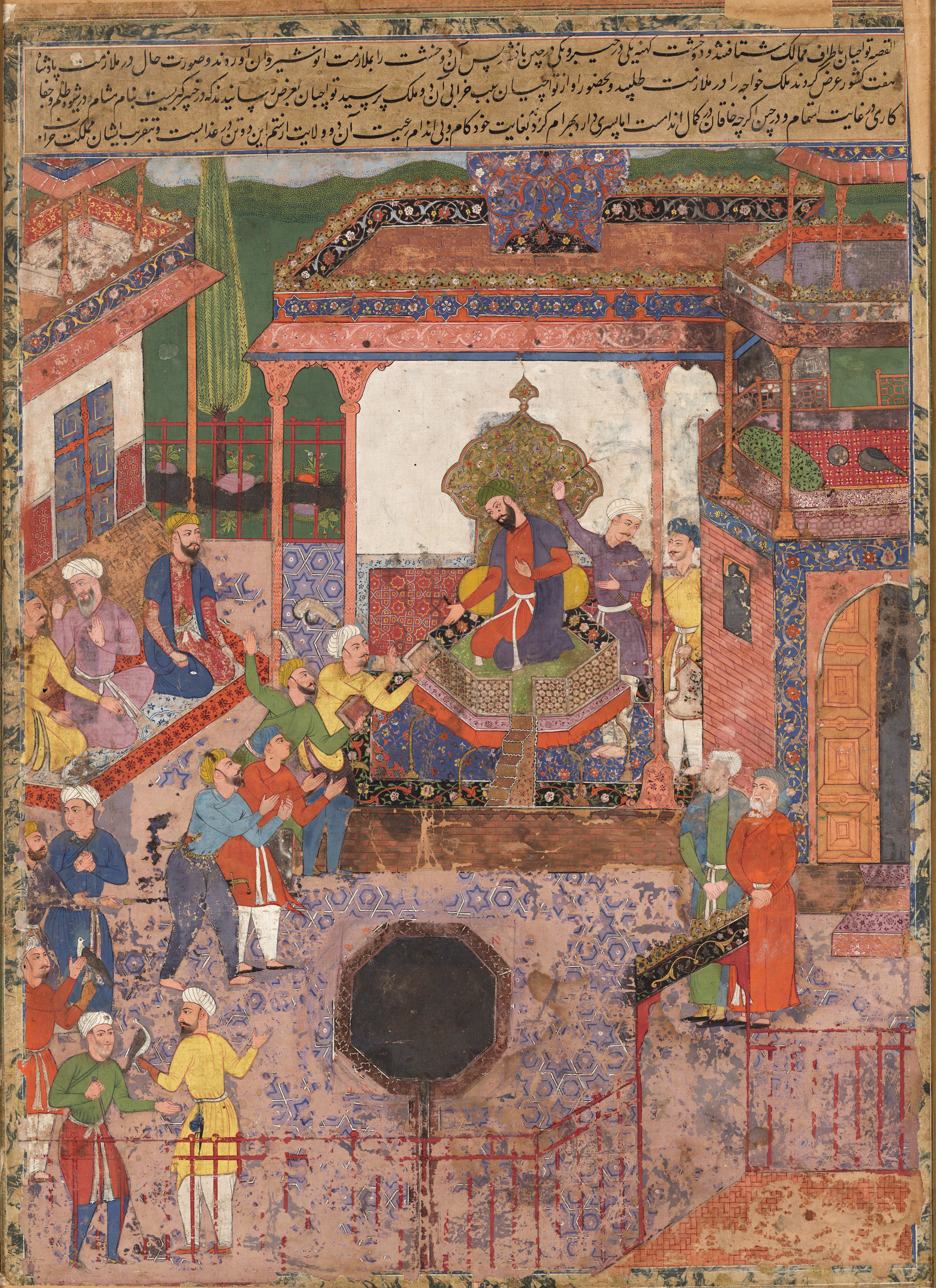
Emissaries bring news from the provinces of Khaybar and Chin to Anoshirvan. From the Hamzanama

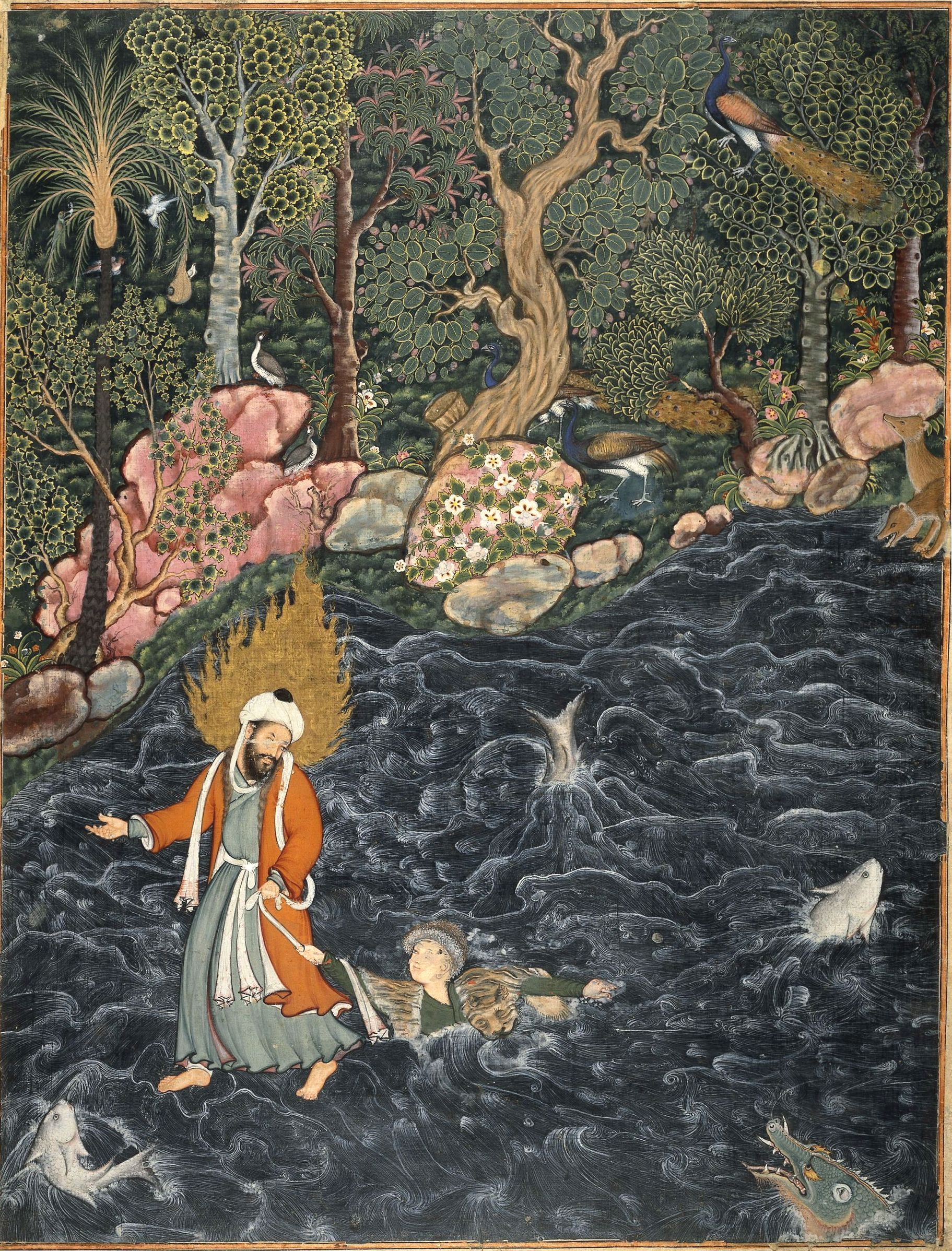
Mir Sayyid Ali, the prophet Elias (Elijah) rescuing Prince Nur ad-Dahr from drowning in a river, from the Akbar Hamzanama

== Legacy ==
Mir Sayyid Ali remained faithful to the end of the Persian tradition and Akbar, where he worked for an international group of artists who advocated the principles of Persian painting. In his works, one can see the influence of his father's and Sultan Muhammad. His work earned him numerous awards and praise. Vizier of Emperor Akbar I, Abu'l-Fazl, in his History of Akbar (Akbarnama) speaks of him the most enthusiastic manner. In al Fadl's the list of the best artists of the era (he counted more than a hundred) Mir Sayyid Ali tied for first place; al Fadl stating: "His art he learned from his father. From the moment he got to the palace, the king's favor beam shone on him. He had distinguished himself by his art ... ". The emperor Humayun gave him the honorary title of "Nadir-ul-Mulk" (The Miracle of the kingdom).

Seven years after the start of the large project for a "Hamzanama" that is, approximately in 1569, the artist left the Mughal court, and as a devout Muslim pilgrim went to Mecca. Some researchers believe that he had died during the Hajj, while others say that he returned to the court of Akbar and died in 1580.

== Sources ==
- Beach, Milo Cleveland, Early Mughal painting, Harvard University Press, 1987, ISBN 0-674-22185-0, ISBN 978-0-674-22185-7
- Amina Okada. Indian Miniatures Of The Mughal Court. Harry N. Abrams, Inc., Publishers, N-Y. 1992
- Dr. M. Abdulla Chaghatai. Mir Sayyid Ali Tabrezi. Publisher: Lahore: Kitab khana-i-nauras, 1955
- Dickson M.B. / Welch S.C. The Houghton Shahnameh. vol.1-2, Cambridge, Mass. 1981
