= Mir Musavvir =

Persian painter

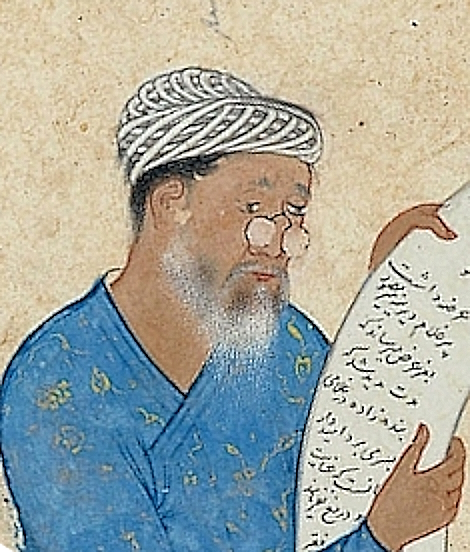
Portrait of Mir Musavvir by Mir Sayyid Ali (signed); c. 1555; opaque watercolor, ink, and gold on paper; 12 cm (height) x 11.1 cm (width); the Louvre Museum. He is shown wearing an Indian turban, so he had likely already joined his fellow artists in the Punjab. Self-portrait according to the Louvre Museum.

Mir Musavvir (fl. 1510–48, died 1555) was a Persian painter at the Safavid court at Tabriz and later the Mughal court at Kabul. During his time at the royal Safavid workshop, he contributed to the Shahnameh of Shah Tahmasp. He was the father of Mir Sayyid Ali, who adopted his occupation of painting.

== Safavid court ==
Mir Musavvir moved to Tabriz from Termez or Badakhshan, where he has no known artistic antecedents. The regional source of his style is evident in his illustrations from the 1520s, for example the painting "Ardashir and the Slave Girl Gulnar" of 1527–8 that he produced for the Shahnameh of Shah Tahmasp; the compositions are carefully constructed, with much attention given to architectural elements and the accurate depiction of objects such as lamps, bowls and ewers. By the 1530s, however, as part of the synthesis of eastern and western Iranian styles of painting, Mir Musavvir’s illustrations became “more broadly conceived and dramatic” and ceased to contain an abundance of minute details.

According to the contemporary chronicler Dust Muhammad, Mir Musavvir and Aqa Mirak worked together closely in service to the Safavid royal library, producing wall paintings for the palace of Prince Sam Mirza and illustrations for the royal manuscript of the Khamsa of Nizami of 1539–43. Mir Musavvir's signature is on a courtier's turban in the painting "Manuchihr Enthroned" of the Shahnameh of Shah Tahmasp, and a verse couplet written in the iwan depicted in the illustration "Nushirwan and the Owls" of the 1539–43 Khamsa manuscript attributes the painting to Mir Musavvir and dates it to 1539–40.

As well as manuscript illustrations, Mir Musavvir produced single-page paintings to be included in albums known as Muraqqas, for example the portrait “Sarkhan Beg the Table-steward”.

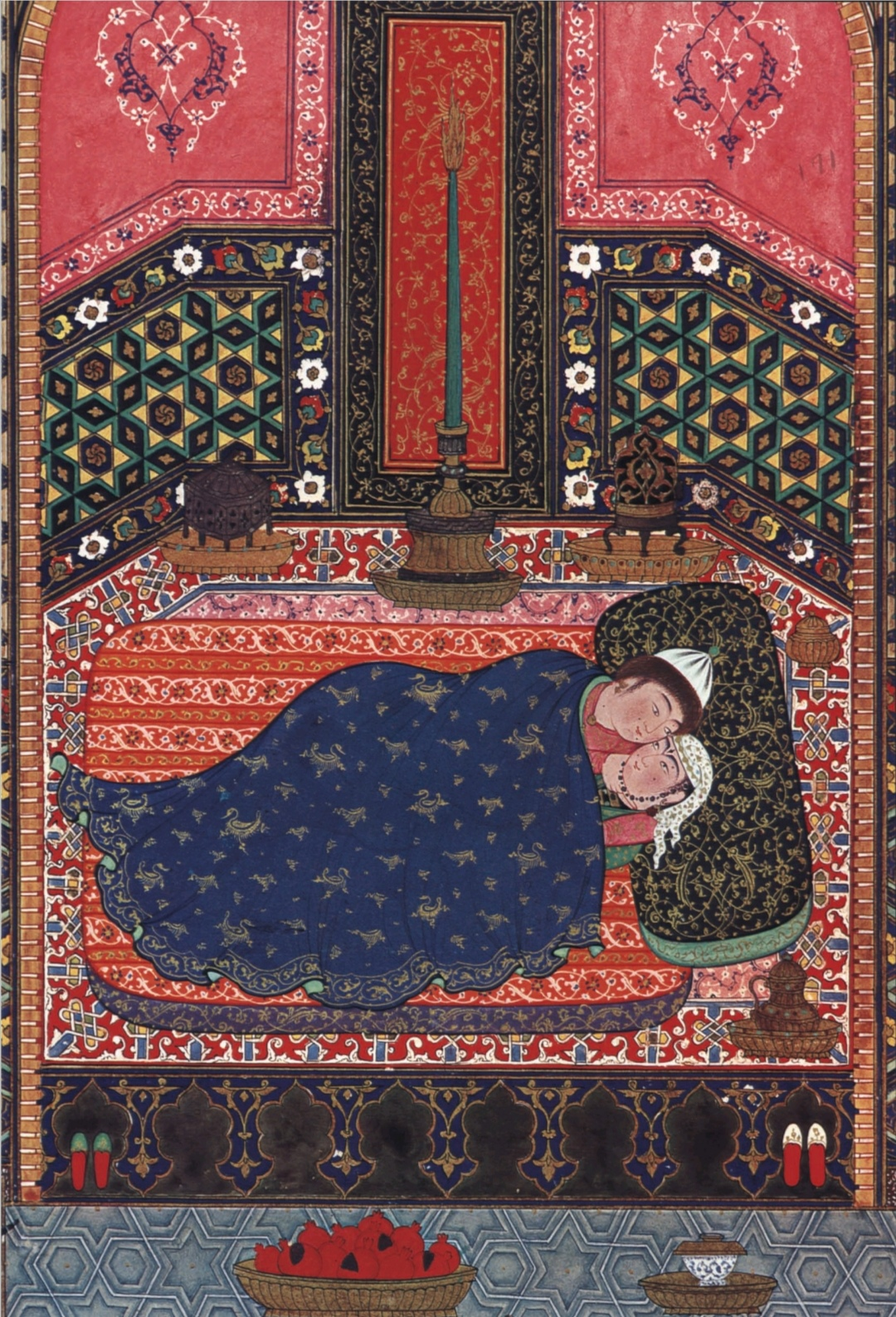
Ardeshir and slave girl Gulnar, 1527–8. Shahnameh of Shah Tahmasp

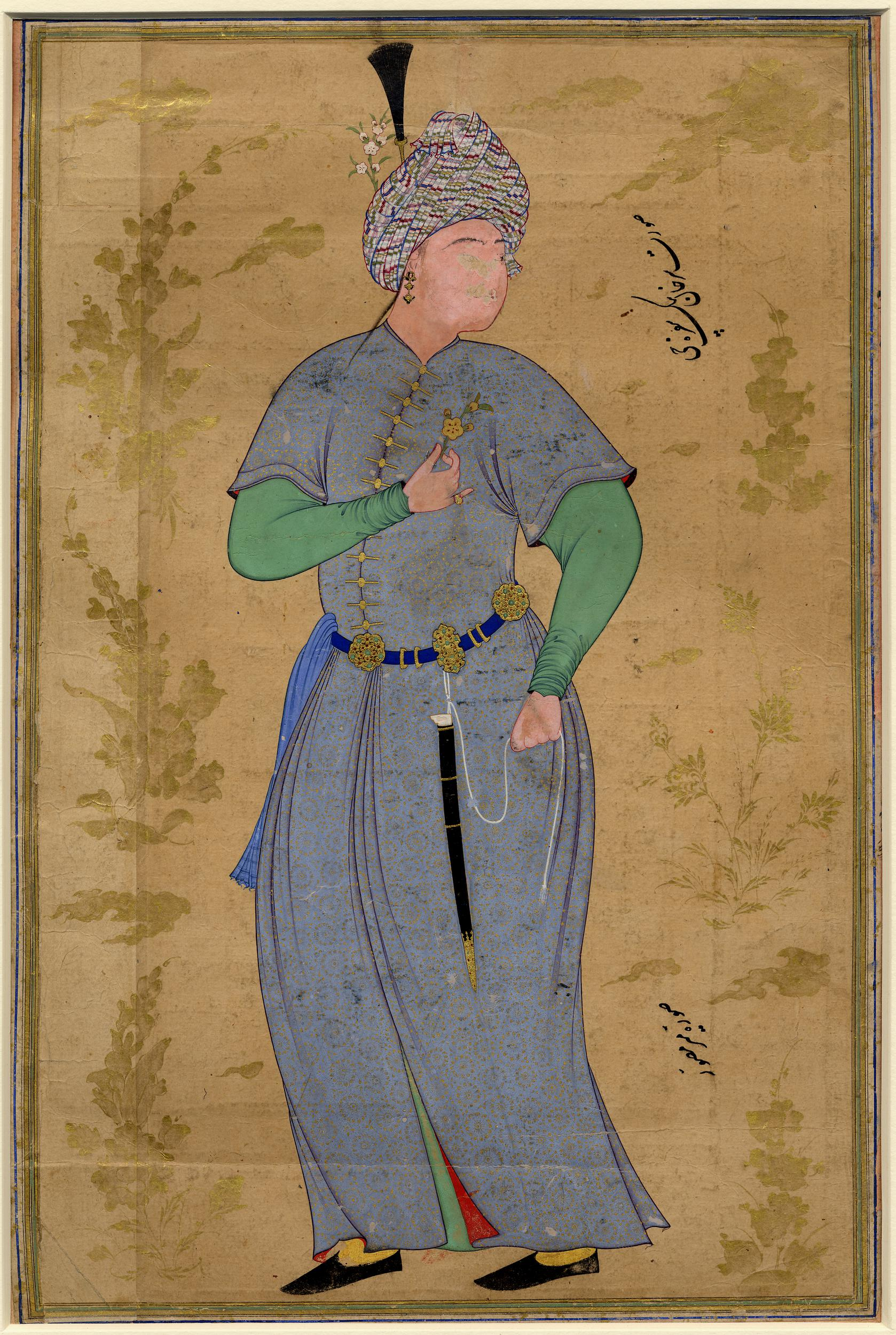
"Sarkhan Beg the Table-steward"; c. 1530; opaque watercolor, ink, and gold on paper; 33 cm (height) x 22 cm (width); the British Museum. This portrait is signed by Mir Musavvir

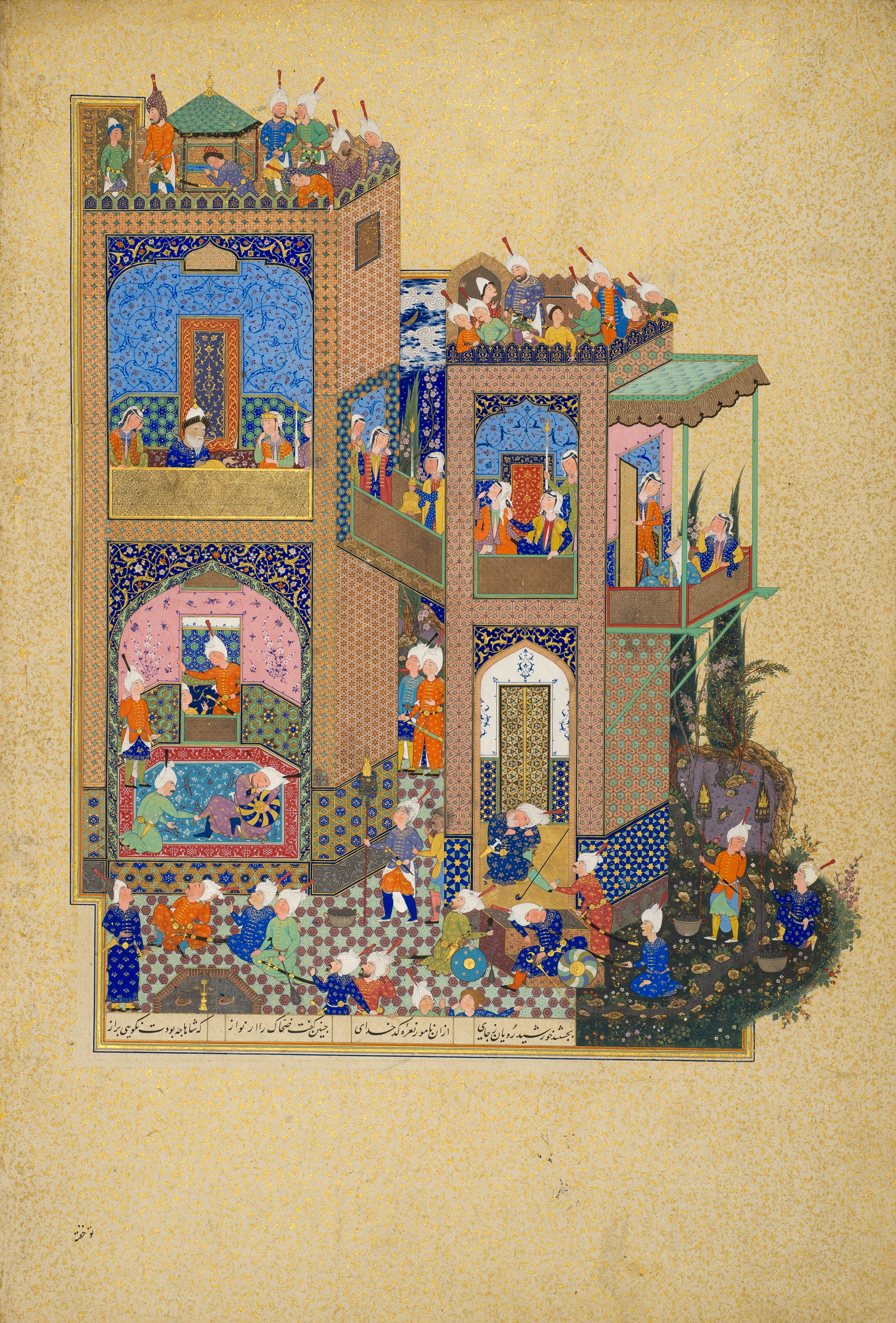
“The Nightmare of Zahhak”, from the Shahnameh of Shah Tahmasp; c. 1525–35; opaque watercolor, ink, and gold on paper; 47.2 cm (height) x 32.1 cm (width); held at the Museum of Islamic Art.

== Mughal court ==
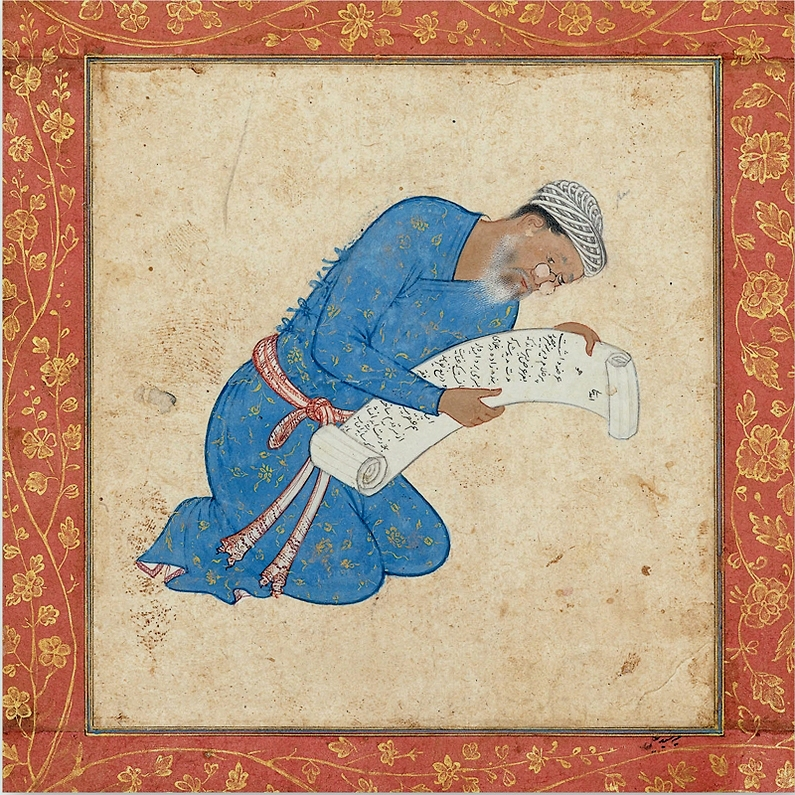
Portrait of Mir Musavvir by Mir Sayyid Ali (signed); c. 1555; opaque watercolor, ink, and gold on paper; 12 cm (height) x 11.1 cm (width); the Louvre Museum.

By November 1549, Mir Musavvir and his son Mir Sayyid Ali had left Iran for the Mughal court at Kabul. Shah Tahmasp I was likely willing to release them only because he himself was no longer actively patronizing them. Mir Musavvir may have arrived in Kabul later than his son, together with Dust Muhammad.

From 1555, Humayun defeated Sultan Sikandar Shah Suri and returned to India, accompanied by his Persian artists who then established ateliers. A 1555 portrait, either by himself or by his son Mir Sayyid Ali, shows him wearing an Indian turban, suggesting he had likely already joined his fellow artists in the Punjab.

Mir Musavvir contributed three miniatures to a Khamsa of Nizami (now in the Kasturbhai and Lalbhai Collection), one of the few remaining manuscripts from Humayun's time, which also included works from local and Uzbek artists, as well as a possible self-portrait. His son, Mir Sayyid Ali, rose to prominence at the Mughal court, where he taught Prince Akbar, and directed the monumental Hamzanama project, and produced various works between the 1550s and his death in 1572.
