= Haftvād =

Character from the Shahnama

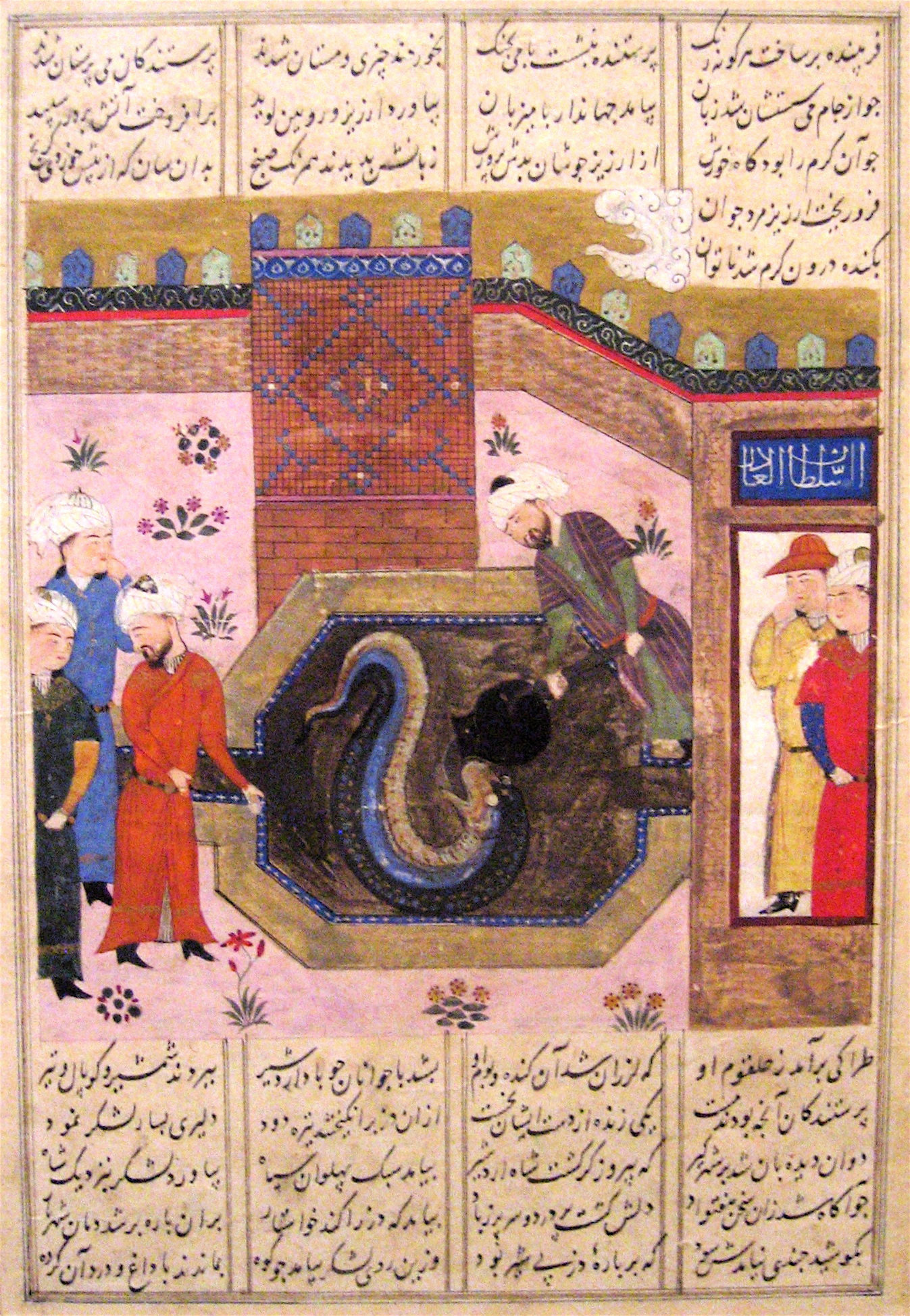
A Persian miniature from a 15th-century manuscript of the Shahnameh depicting Ardashir killing Hafvād's worm.

Haftvād (Persian: هفتواد) is a legendary character whose story appears alongside accounts of the rise of Ardashir I, the founder of the Sassanid dynasty of Persia, in the third century C.E. Haftvād is mentioned in various sources, most notably the Shahnameh of Abu'l-Qāsim Ferdowsī Tūsī.

== Haftvād in the Shahnameh ==
The tale of Haftvād appears in the section of the Shahnameh on the reign of Ardashir. The story opens with a description of Haftvād's daughter, who works as a spinner. Haftvād pays her little attention, instead favoring the seven sons for whom he is named ("haft" means "seven" in Persian, and "vād" means "son"). One day, as Haftvād's daughter takes a break from spinning to eat lunch on the mountainside with her fellow spinners, she spies an apple on the ground. She bites into it and finds a small worm, which she hides away in her spindle case. That day she spins twice as much as she normally does. It soon becomes apparent that the worm is special, as Haftvād's daughter miraculously spins greater and greater amounts of wool.

Haftvād takes great care of the worm, feeding it hearty food and providing it with a luxurious chest to live in. The amount of thread Haftvād's daughter spins brings the family great wealth, and Haftvād and his sons become prominent in the town. A local nobleman takes umbrage at their influence, and Haftvād uses his new-found wealth to gather an army, kill the nobleman, and take charge of the town. He builds a fortress on a mountaintop outside the town and encloses the entire area with a massive wall. Haftvād continues to amass wealth and followers, and his worm grows until it reaches the size of an elephant.

Ardashir is displeased when he hears of Hafvād's growing power, and so he sends an army against him, expecting easy victory. The army is routed by Haftvād's forces, and Ardashir resolves to go to battle himself against Haftvād. Once again, Ardashir's forces fare poorly against those of Haftvād, and the king retreats with his army to an encampment by a salt lake. Their supply lines are cut off, and Ardashir's troubles are compounded by news that his palace at home has been pillaged by an enemy in his absence. As the king and his commanders confer over a meal, an arrow flies through the darkness and embeds itself in the meat they are eating. On it is an inscription telling them that no one can achieve victory against Haftvād's worm.

The next day the king and his troops retreat in despair, pursued from the rear by Haftvād's forces. Ardashir and his entourage come upon two young men, who ask why they are fleeing. The strangers feed the king not knowing who he is, but they reassure him that Haftvād will be defeated. Ardashir reveals his identity, and asks the men to tell him how he is to fight Haftvād. They tell him that he will only find success if he kills the worm.

After returning to his home to wreak vengeance on the enemy who destroyed his palace, Ardashir musters another army and sets off to attack Haftvād once again. The troops set up camp some distance away from Haftvād's castle, and Ardashir chooses seven warriors to accompany him on a secret mission. Disguised as a caravan of wealthy merchants, the eight men, accompanied by the two strangers, enter Haftvād's city. They carry with them valuable goods, two chests of lead, and a cauldron. Upon reaching the castle, they request the opportunity to show their wares, and are granted entrance. After ingratiating himself with the worm's caretakers, Ardashir is given permission to feed the worm for three days. He and his companions ply the guards with wine, and when they fall into an intoxicated slumber, Ardashir melts the lead in the cauldron. When the worm opens its mouth expecting to be fed, the men pour the molten lead down his gullet, killing the serpent. Its dying throes rock the entire town.

Ardashir and his companions send up a smoke signal, and their army joins them and takes control of the city, defeating Haftvād's forces. Haftvād and his son are brutally executed, and Ardashir's troops plunder the town and return victorious to Persia behind their king.

== Haftvād and the historical record ==
The late Iranian Studies Professor Shapur Shahbazi noted Haftvād's connection to history: "Despite these legendary elements, the story is clearly woven around a historical base, namely, Ardashir's effort to conquer the Persian coastland and the neighboring regions of Makran and Kerman, and the heavy local resistance that he had to overcome. The maritime trade must have made these regions wealthy, and it is quite possible […] that a local industry for making silk had developed on the Persian Gulf, and its patrons had jealously guarded its secret and amassed great wealth in their strongholds. It has been pointed out that already Aristotle had learned 'of a certain great worm with horns, as it were, which produces bombycine or cocoons which the women use in weaving.' The entire episode rests on the rationalization of an historical event: on the shore of the Persian Gulf, a mighty pirate, probably influenced by an Indian Nāga cult, had earned the enmity of Zoroastrian priests […] and Ardashir vanquished him with great difficulty. This eventually gave rise to a legend concerning a divine worm (kerm) and the story of Haftvād and his seven sons."

== Haftvād in other sources ==
The story of Haftvād appears in the Book of the Deeds of Ardashir, a mythological tale written in the Sassanid period and used by Ferdowsi as a source in writing the Shahnameh. A more abbreviated reference to the story exists in History of the Prophets and Kings, a monumental work by the famous 9th-century Persian historian Muhammad ibn Jarir al-Tabari.

== Parallel stories in world folklore ==
The Haftvād story echoes world folklore motifs, and scholar Kinga Ilona Markus-Takeshita has noted parallels between the Shahnameh account and world folklore types like that of the Dragon-Slayer and the Spinning Maiden.

== The Haftvād story in Persianate art ==
Scenes from the story of Haftvād have been depicted in Persian miniatures that adorn illuminated manuscripts of the Shahnameh, including the famous Houghton Shahnameh.
