= Shah Mosque =

Shah Mosque (Persian: مسجد شاه) may refer to:

- Shah Mosque (Isfahan), also known as the New Abbasi Mosque or Royal Mosque, in Isfahan, Iran
- Shah Mosque (Mashhad), a mosque in Mashhad
- Shah Mosque (Tehran), also known as the Soltāni Mosque, in Tehran, Iran
