= Mohebb Ali Beg =

Safavid courtier (16th–17th centuries)

The Shah Mosque in Isfahan, constructed under the supervision and funding of Mohebb Ali Beg.

Mohebb Ali Beg (Persian: محب علی بیگ; fl. late 16th–early 17th centuries) was the laleh-ye gholaman (tutor of the gholams) and supervisor of the royal building projects in Safavid Iran.

At the court in Isfahan, Mohebb Ali Beg functioned as an intermediary to create ties between the concubine queen Dilaram Khanum and the military sphere. The task of delivering the announcement of the death of Abbas the Great from Mazandaran to Isfahan was performed by Mohebb Ali Beg.

Mohebb Ali Beg was disgraced in 1629, following the enthronement of Shah Safi.

== Sources ==
- Babaie, Sussan; Babayan, Kathryn; Baghdiantz-McCabe, Ina; Farhad, Massumeh (2004). Slaves of the Shah: New Elites of Safavid Iran. I.B. Tauris. ISBN 978-1860647215.
- Babaie, Sussan (2021). "Safavid architecture". In Matthee, Rudi (ed.). The Safavid World. Routledge. pp. 507–536. ISBN 978-1138944060.
- Newman, Andrew J. (2006). Safavid Iran: Rebirth of a Persian Empire. I.B. Tauris. ISBN 978-0857716613.
