= Ali Akbar Isfahani =

17th-century Persian architect

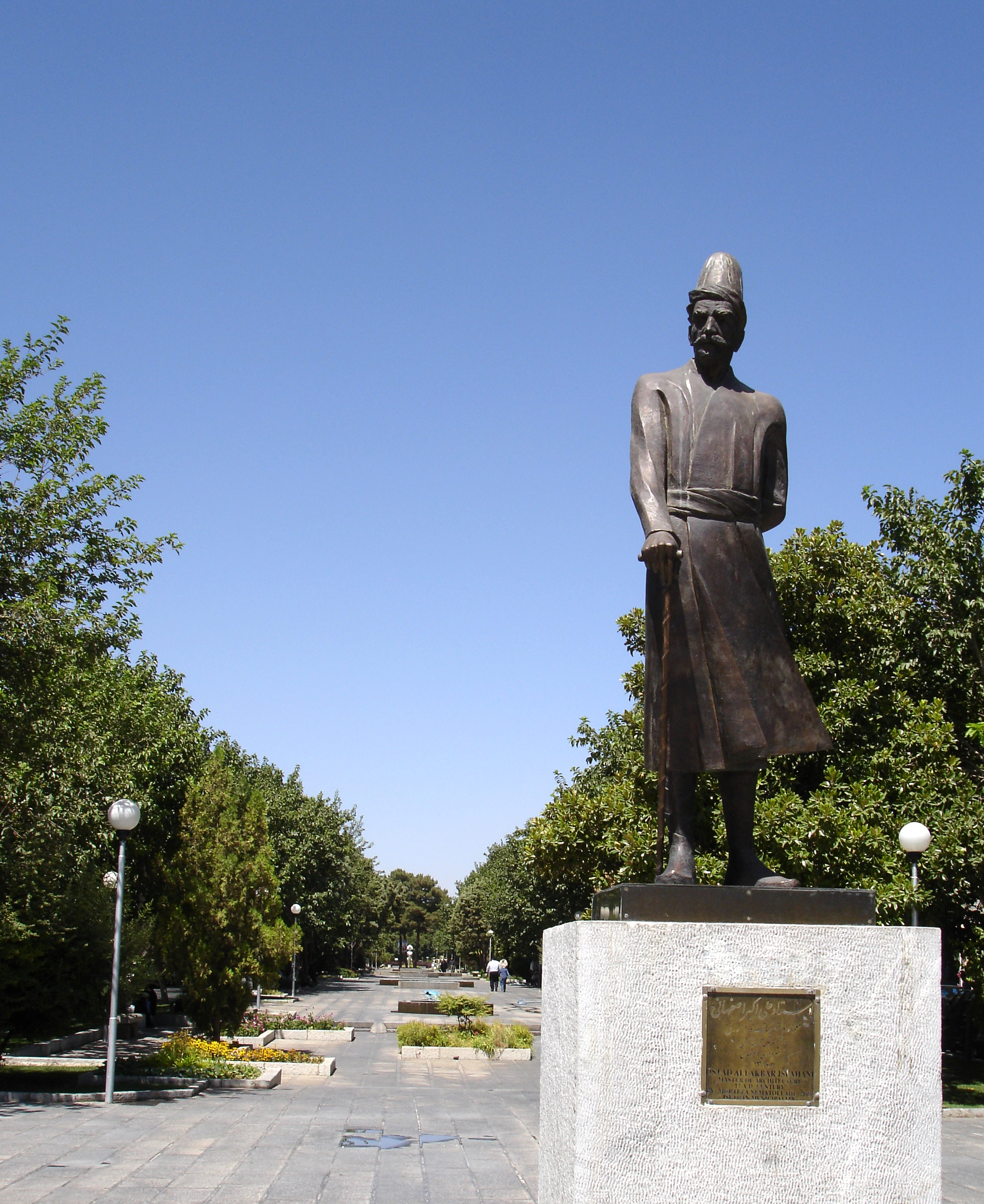
Statue of Ali Akbar Isfahani

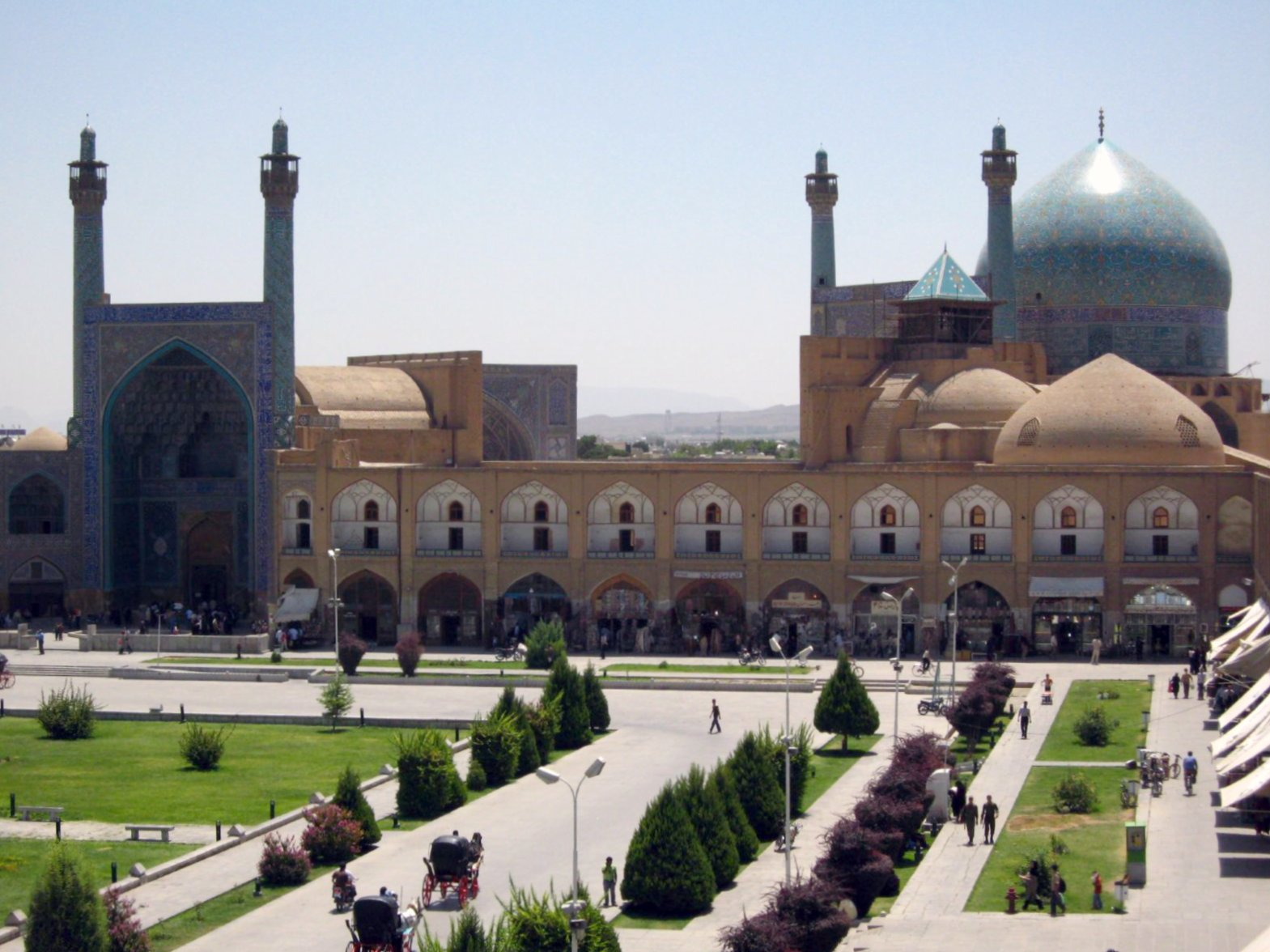
Shah Mosque by Ali Akbar Isfahani

Ali Akbar Isfahani (Persian: علی اکبر معمار اصفهانی) was a Persian architect of the Safavid era. He is best known for the Shah Mosque commissioned by Shah Abbas and built in 1611–1631. His name appears in an inscription in the mosque above the doorway of the entrance iwan complex of the mosque.

Isfahani was born in 985 AH (1577 AD). He was a pupil of Badi' al-Zaman Yazdi, the grand architect of Shah Abbas.
