= Laleh-ye gholaman =

Laleh-ye gholaman was the title of the tutor of the eunuch and non-eunuch gholams in Safavid Iran. While one person initially held the post, the functions were shared by two individuals during the late Safavid period.

== Sources ==
- Floor, Willem (2001). Safavid Government Institutions. Mazda Publishers. ISBN 978-1568591353.
