= Shah Mosque (Mashhad) =

Twlever Shi'ite mosque in Mashhad, Razavi Khorasan, Iran

- مسجد شاه مشهد
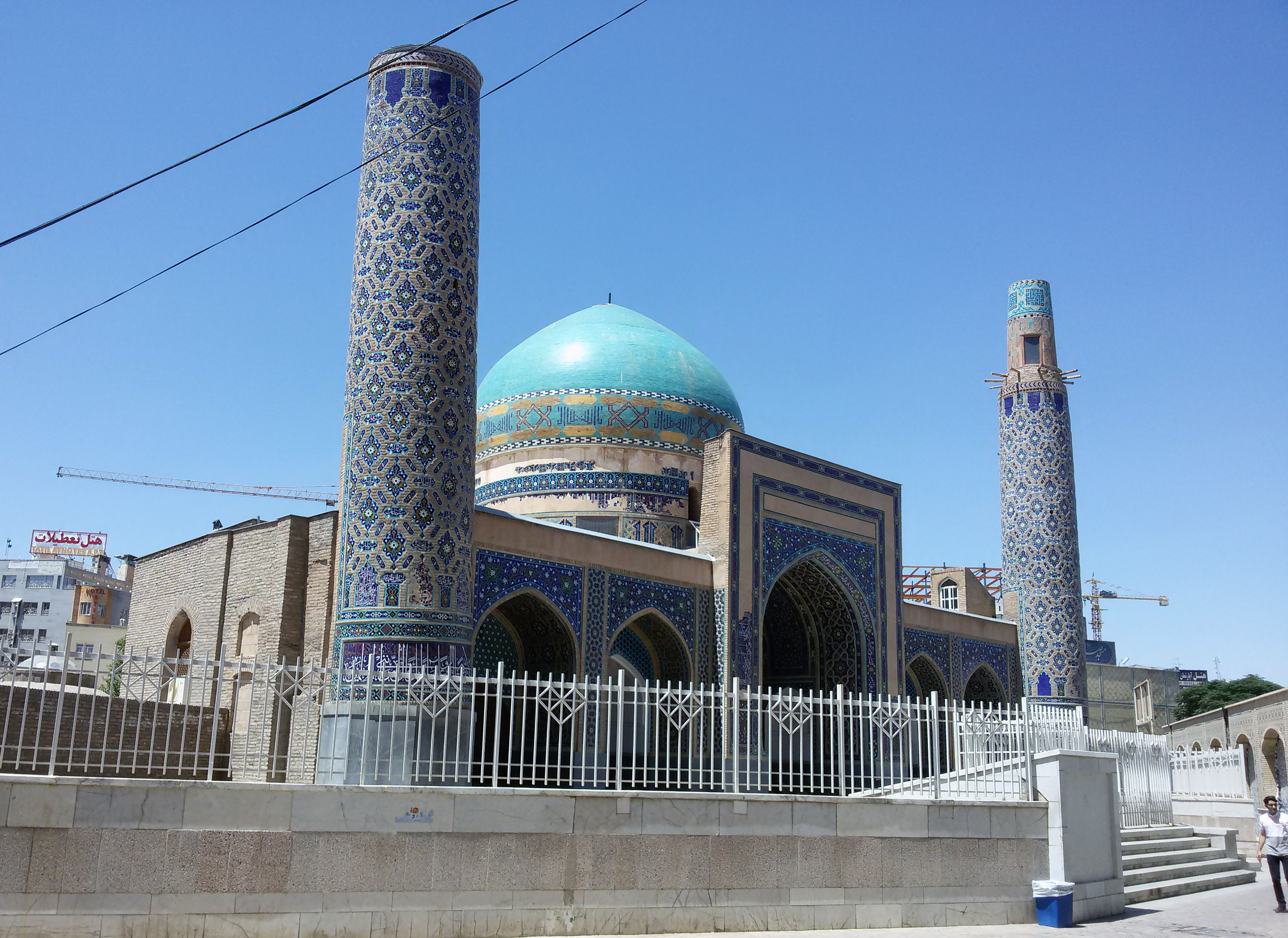
- The mosque in 2017

- Location of the mosque in Iran

Religion
- Affiliation: Shia (Twelver)
- Ecclesiastical or organisational status: Mausoleum; Mosque
- Status: Active

Location
- Location: Mashhad, Razavi Khorasan province
- Country: Iran
- Coordinates: 36°17′16″N 59°36′40″E

Architecture
- Architect: Ahmed ibn Shams al-Din Muhammad Tabrizi
- Type: Mosque architecture
- Style: Timurid; Safavid
- Completed: 1462 (as a mausoleum); 1451 (as a mosque); 1707 (renovation)

Specifications
- Dome: One
- Dome height (outer): 17.4 m (57 ft)
- Minaret: Two
- Minaret height: 20 m (66 ft) (northern); 15.4 m (51 ft) (southern)
- Materials: Stone; bricks; mortar

Iran National Heritage List
- Official name: Shah Mosque
- Type: Mosque
- Designated: 1932
- Part of: Imam Reza Shrine
- Reference no.: 186
- Conservation organization: Cultural Heritage, Handicrafts and Tourism Organization of Iran

The Shah Mosque (Persian: مسجد شاه (مشهد), romanized: Masjid-i Shah), also known, since the Iranian Revolution, as the Haftado Dotan Mosque (Persian: مسجد هفتاد و دو تن, lit. 'Mosque of Seventy-two Martyrs') is a Twelver Shi'ite mausoleum and mosque that forms part of the Imam Reza Shrine complex, located in Mashhad, in the province of Razavi Khorasan, Iran.

The mosque dates from the Timurid period, and was added to the Iran National Heritage List on 9 July 1932, administered by the Cultural Heritage, Handicrafts and Tourism Organization of Iran.

== History ==
Originally, at the site of the mosque, a mausoleum was built for the Timurid noble, Amir Ghiyath al-Din, known by his title "Malikshah". Later on, it was expanded into a larger mosque, which was completed in 1451, and the mosque subsequently was known as the Shah Mosque. During the Safavid era, the mosque was renovated extensively by Soltan Hoseyn and a final renovation was completed during the rule of Nader Shah Afshar.

The Shah Mosque was listed as a national heritage site of Iran in 1893. The mosque was renamed to "Haftado Dotan Mosque" after the Iranian Revolution, the word "Haftado Dotan" being Persian for seventy-two martyrs. This was done in memory of the important people killed during the revolution, which numbered up to 72, coinciding with the number of casualties of the Ahlulbayt side in the Battle of Karbala. In modern times, the front portico of the mosque was converted into an office building and was closed to the public.

== Architecture ==
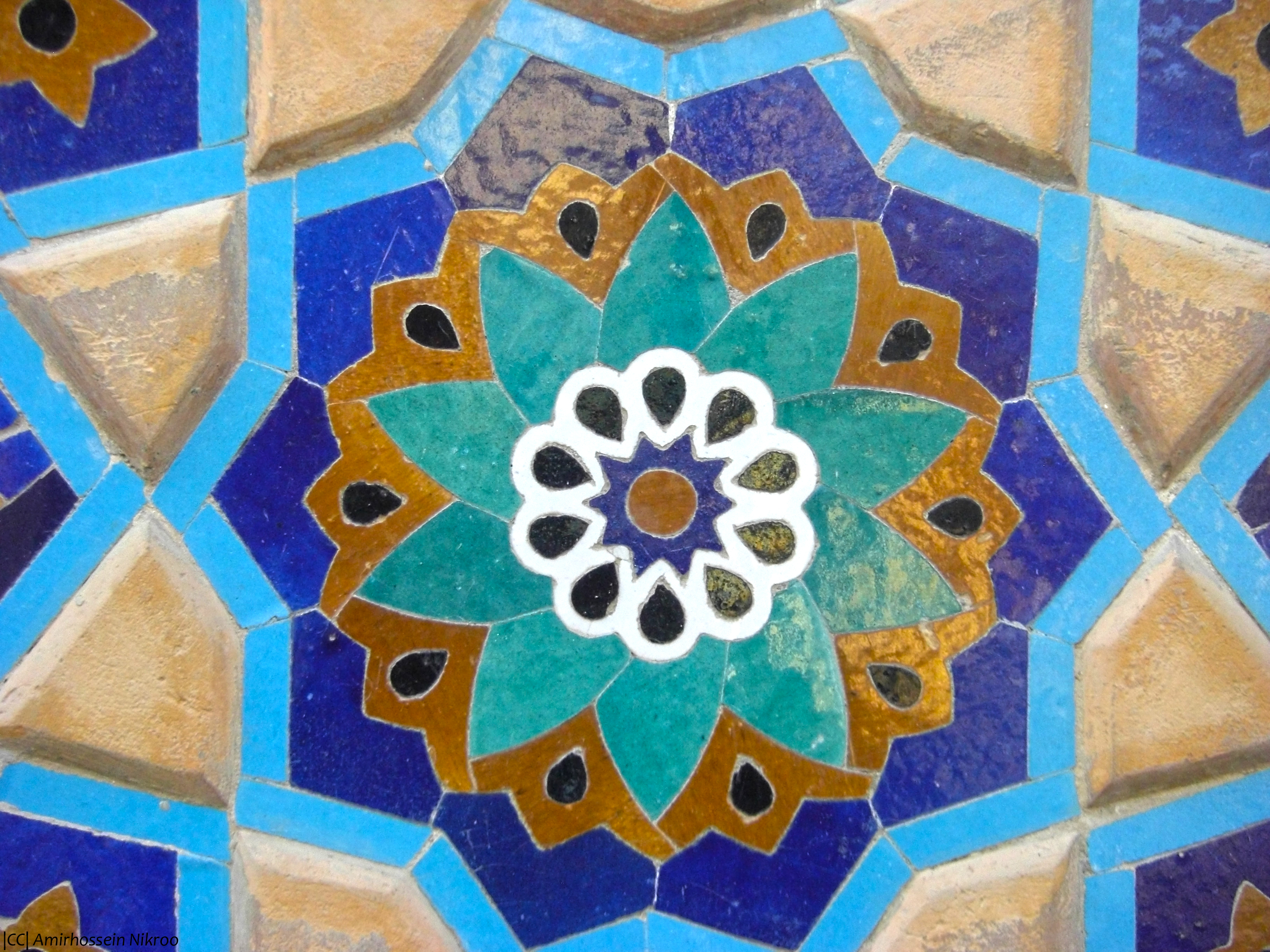
Closeup of a decorative tilework pattern inside the mosque

The mosque has a large, bulbous dome and two minarets which are not connected to it at all. The bulbous dome is decorated with turquoise tiles and the inscription, Allahus-Samad (which translates as "God is Eternal"), embedded repeatedly in the design. Currently, some of the designs on the dome are fading away. From the outside, the dome has a height of 17.4 metres (57 ft), that covers a smaller inner dome. Underneath this inner dome is a crypt containing a tomb which is attributed to Amir Ghiyath al-Din Malik Shah. The surfaces of the domed room are covered with dark-green tiles; both in the dado and above it, the rows of tiles are separated by some calligraphic inscriptions. There is no mihrab; however, a small niche in a wall which is pointed in the qibla direction can be seen in a room next to this domed room and crypt. The southern minaret of the mosque is slightly ruined, and it is 15.4 metres (51 ft) high.

== Gallery ==
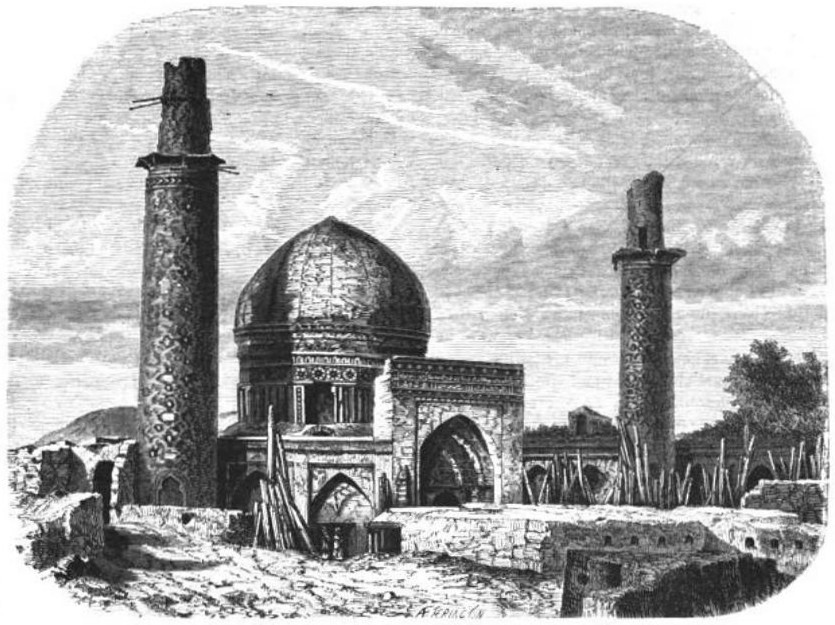
1861 illustration by Alexandre de Bar in Le Tour du Monde, vol. IV.

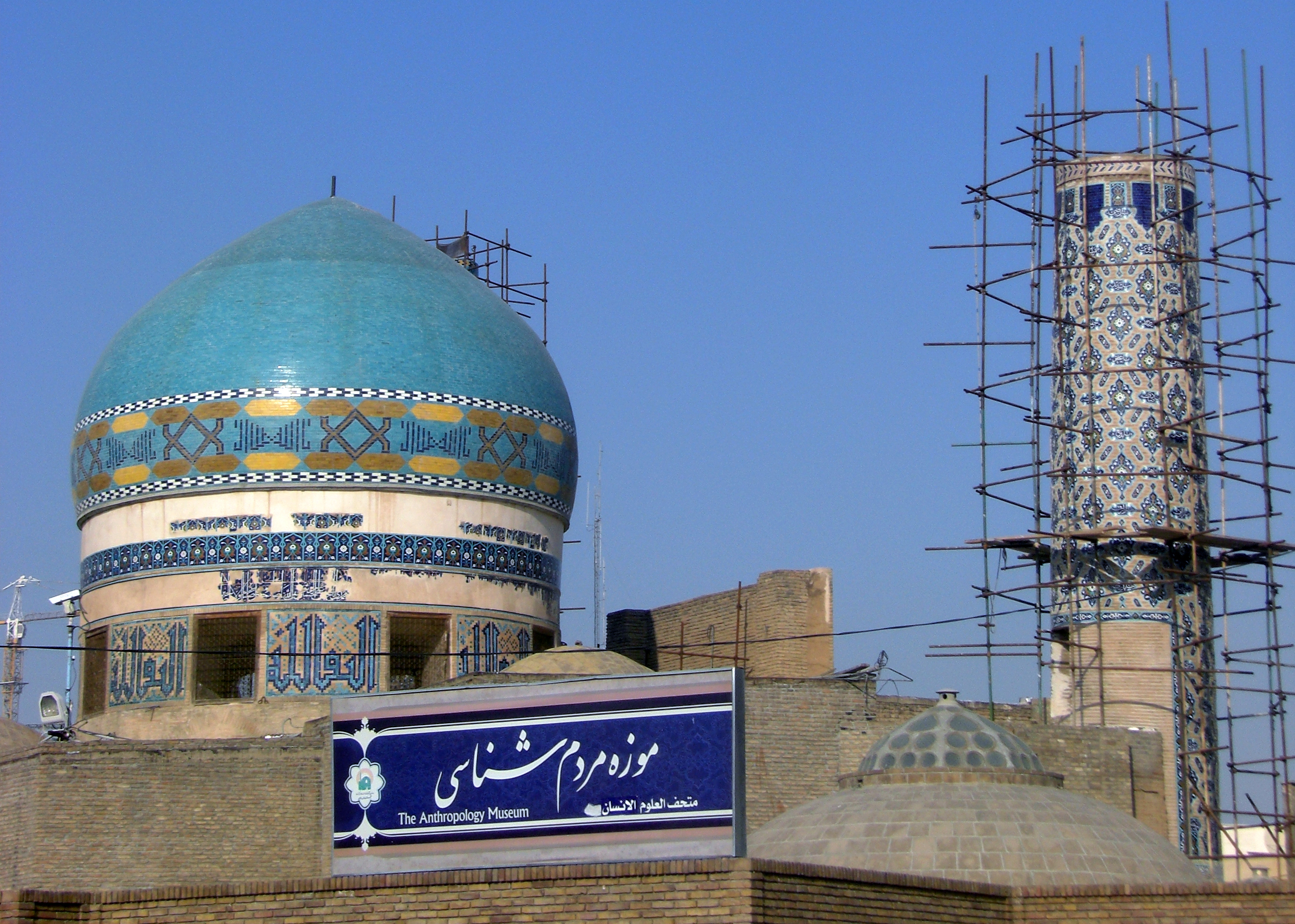
The mosque in 2011

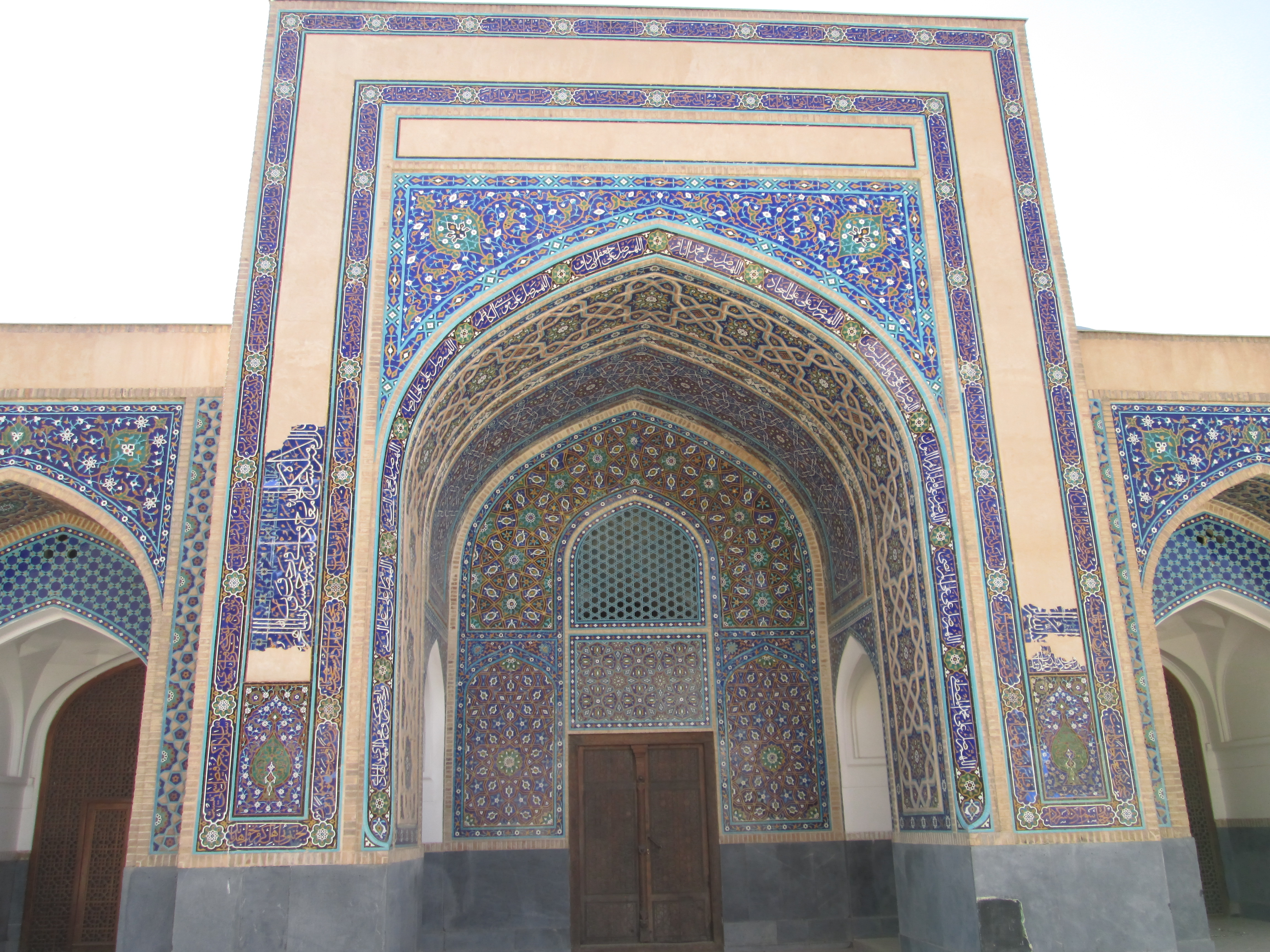
Closeup of the mosque's main iwan

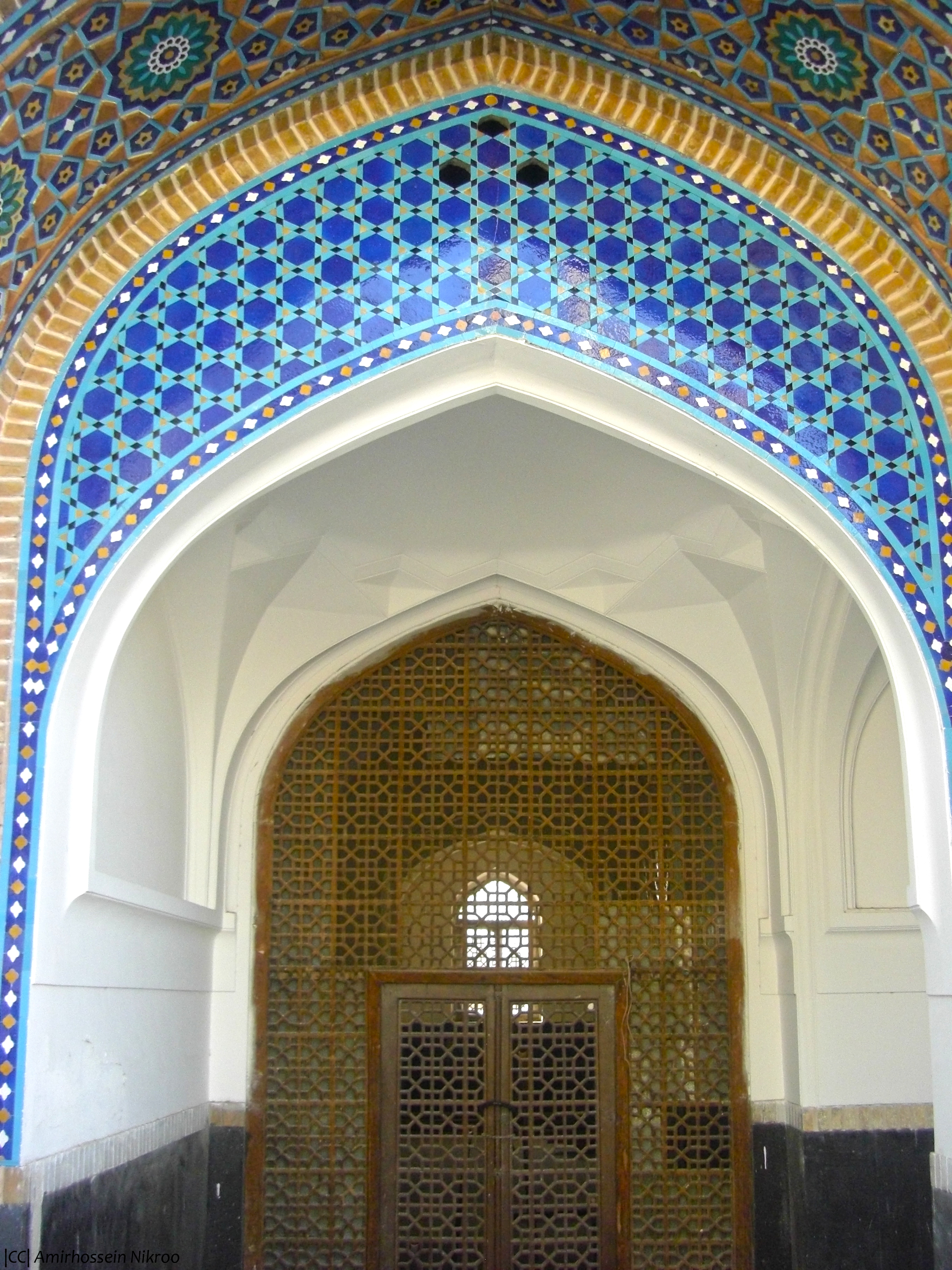
The tomb attributed to Amir Ghiyath al-Din Malik Shah in the mosque

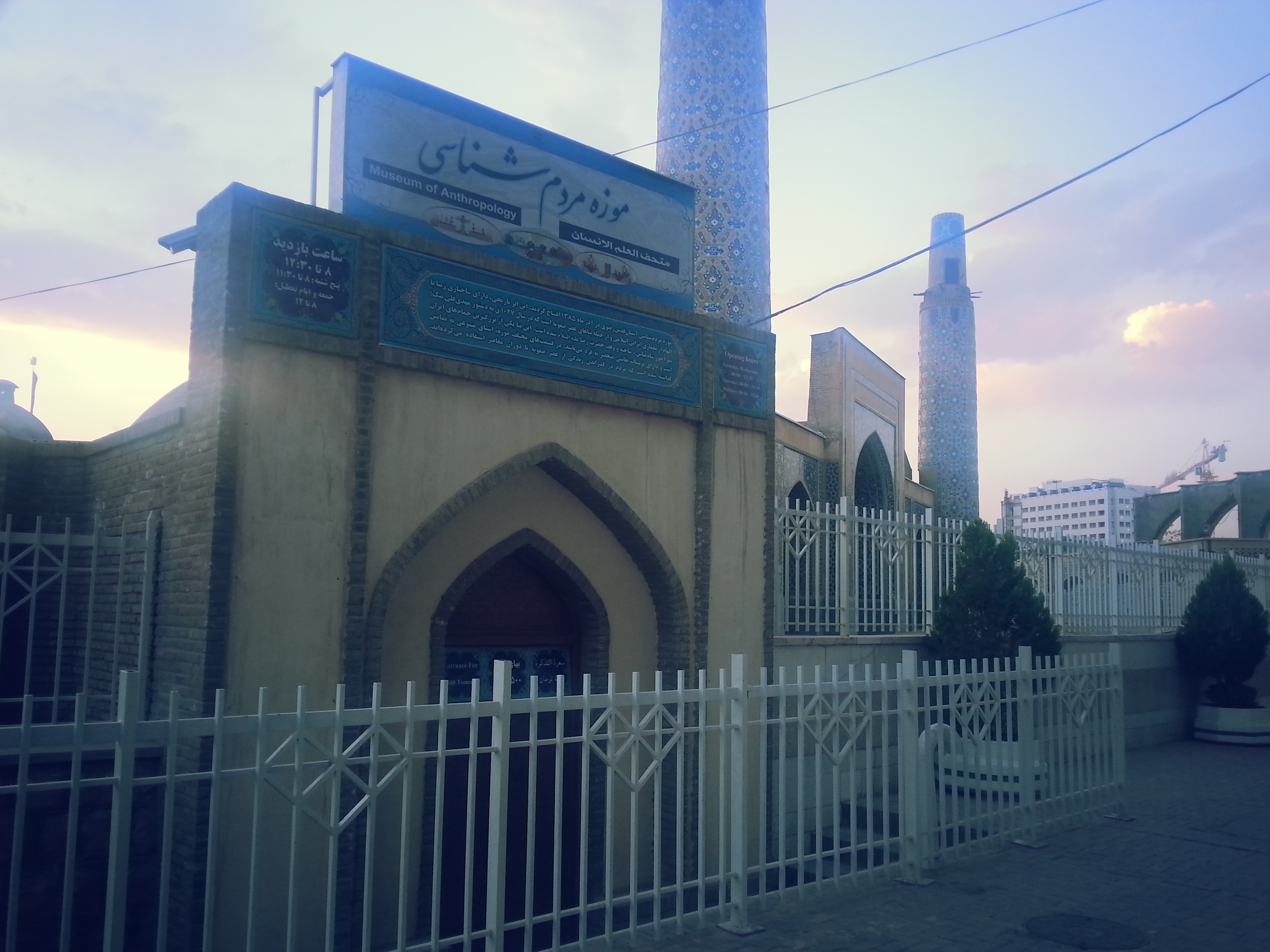
The hammam which is located next to the mosque

== See also ==
- Shia Islam in Iran
- List of mausoleums in Iran
- List of mosques in Iran
- Persian domes
