= Shah Mosque (Isfahan) =

Shi'ite mosque in Isfahan, Iran

- مسجد شاه
- The mosque in 2009

- Location of the mosque in Iran

Religion
- Affiliation: Shia Islam
- Ecclesiastical or organisational status: Mosque
- Status: Active

Location
- Location: Naqsh-e Jahan Square, Esfahan, Isfahan province
- Country: Iran
- Coordinates: 32°39′16″N 51°40′39″E

Architecture
- Architects: Ali Akbar Isfahani; Badi al-Zaman-i Tuni (early phase)
- Type: Mosque
- Style: Safavid
- Founder: Abbas the Great
- Groundbreaking: 1611
- Completed: c. 1630
- Construction cost: 20,000 toman

Specifications
- Length: 100 m (330 ft)
- Width: 130 m (430 ft)
- Dome: 3
- Dome height (outer): 52 m (171 ft)
- Dome height (inner): 38 m (125 ft)
- Dome dia. (inner): approx. 25 m (82 ft)
- Minaret: 4
- Materials: bricks, ceramic tiles, alabaster

UNESCO World Heritage Site
- Type: Built
- Criteria: Cultural: (i)(v)(vi)
- Designated: 1979
- Part of: Meidan Emam, Esfahan
- Reference no.: 115

Iran National Heritage List
- Official name: Shah Mosque
- Type: Mosque
- Designated: 1932
- Reference no.: 107
- Conservation organization: Cultural Heritage, Handicrafts and Tourism Organization of Iran

The Shah Mosque (Persian: مسجد شاه, lit. 'Masjed-e Shah'), also officially known as the Imam Mosque or Imam Khomeini Mosque, is a mosque located on the south side of Naqsh-e Jahan Square in Isfahan, in the province of Isfahan, Iran. Its construction began in 1611, during the Safavid Empire under the order of Abbas the Great, and was completed c. 1630.

It is regarded as one of the masterpieces of Iranian architecture in the Islamic era. The mosque is registered, along with the Naghsh-e Jahan Square and other surrounding structures, as a UNESCO World Heritage Site. It was added to the Iran National Heritage List on 6 January 1932, administered by the Cultural Heritage, Handicrafts and Tourism Organization of Iran. The mosque is depicted on the reverse of the Iranian 20,000 rials banknote.

== History ==
=== Construction ===
In 1598, when Shah Abbas decided to move his capital from the northwestern city of Qazvin to the central city of Isfahan, he initiated what would become one of the greatest programs in Iranian history; the complete remaking of this ancient city. By choosing the central city of Isfahan, fertilized by the Zāyandeh River ("the life-giving river"), lying as an oasis of intense cultivation in the midst of a vast area of arid landscape, he both distanced his capital from any future assaults by Iran's neighboring arch rival, the Ottomans, and at the same time gained more control over the Persian Gulf, which had recently become an important trading route for the Dutch and British East India Companies.

Shah Abbas's urban planning focused on two key features: the Chahar Bagh avenue, flanked at either side by all the prominent institutions of the city, such as the residences of all foreign dignitaries, and the Naqsh-e Jahan Square ("Exemplar of the World"). Prior to his ascent to power, Iran had a decentralized power structure, in which different institutions battled for power, including both the military (the Qizilbash) and governors of the different provinces making up the empire. Shah Abbas wanted to undermine this political structure, and the recreation of Isfahan, as a grand capital of Iran, was an important step in centralizing the power.

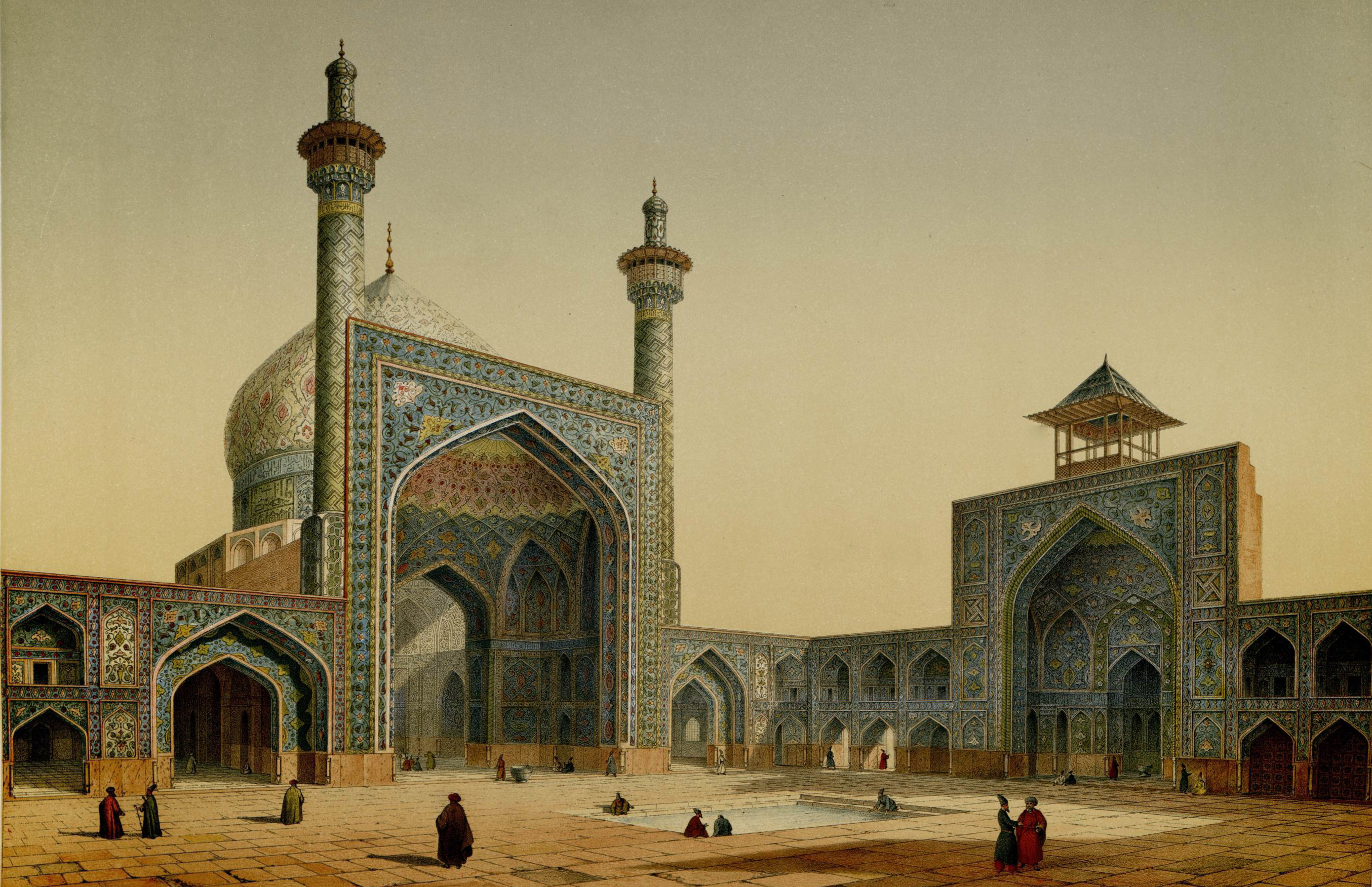
Painting by the French architect, Pascal Coste, visiting Iran in 1841. The painting shows the main courtyard, with two of the iwans. The iwan to the right is topped by the goldast, which in many Iranian mosques had replaced the function of the minarets.

Construction of the Naqsh-e Jahan Square began around 1590. Construction on the Shah Mosque itself, which was part of this project, only began in 1611 (1020 AH), possibly due to delays in purchasing the land required. Based on the series of dated inscriptions around the mosque, construction was probably completed around 1630–1 (1040 AH), which is the date of the inscription on the mosque's western iwan. This indicates that construction finished in the early years of Abbas's successor, Shah Safi. The alabaster dadoes around the mosque were only added in 1638. The construction was reported to have cost 60,000 tomans, reflecting the size of the project.

The name of the architect Ali Akbar Isfahani appears in the main foundation inscription of the mosque, located above the doorway of the entrance iwan. The inscription also mentions that the supervisor of the construction was Mohebb Ali Beg, who was also a major donor to the mosque. Another architect, Badi al-Zaman-i Tuni, is mentioned as the imperial architect during an account of the land purchases prior to construction. He may have been involved in the early phase of construction, while Ali Akbar most likely completed the project. The name of the calligrapher Ali Riza (or Ali Reza), who also designed the inscriptions for the nearby Lotfallah Mosque, appears at the end of the same inscription, suggesting he was involved in designing the mosque's epigraphic compositions.

Because of the Shah's desire to have the building completed during his lifetime, shortcuts were taken in the construction; for example, the Shah ignored warnings by one of the architects, Abu'l Qāsim, regarding the danger of subsidence in the foundations of the mosque, and he pressed ahead with the construction. The architect proved to be right, as in 1662 the building had to undergo major repairs.

=== Recent history ===
In the years after the 1979 Iranian Revolution, the mosque's official name was changed to Imam Khomeini Mosque or Imam Mosque, in honour of Ruhollah Khomeini.

The latest restoration project on the mosque began in 2010. Damage to the dome was discovered in 2022 due to errors in the work. In June 2024, Iranian officials announced the completion of the restoration work on the dome, including repairs to correct the previous errors. In June 2025, another phase of the restoration was announced and aimed at restoring the tile decoration on the middle portion of the dome, with a budget of over 8.5 billion Iranian rials.

In the 2026 Iran war started by the US and Israel, the world heritage site has suffered damages according to numerous reports. UNESCO confirmed damage to multiple World Heritage Sites and on 11 March urged all parties to protect heritage sites.

== Architecture ==
=== Layout and features ===
The mosque is integrated with the design of the Naqsh-e Jahan Square. It is entered through a monumental iwan (a vaulted space open to one side) that is topped by two minarets. The portal is around 27.5 metres (90 ft) tall and the minarets are 33.5 metres (110 ft) tall. The vault inside the iwan is filled with an elaborate muqarnas (stalactite-like) composition. Because the square is not aligned with the qibla (the direction of Mecca), the mosque's large vestibule makes an approximately 45-degree turn towards the southwest to allow the rest of the building to follow the correct alignment for prayers. Scholar Donald Wilber suggests that this general design choice could have been deliberate: because the prayer hall of the mosque is placed on a different axis, its dome is thus prominently visible from the main square, whereas the dome would have been obscured by the mosque's entrance portal if it had been on the same axis as the square. Aside from this bend, the rest of the mosque's internal layout is highly symmetrical.

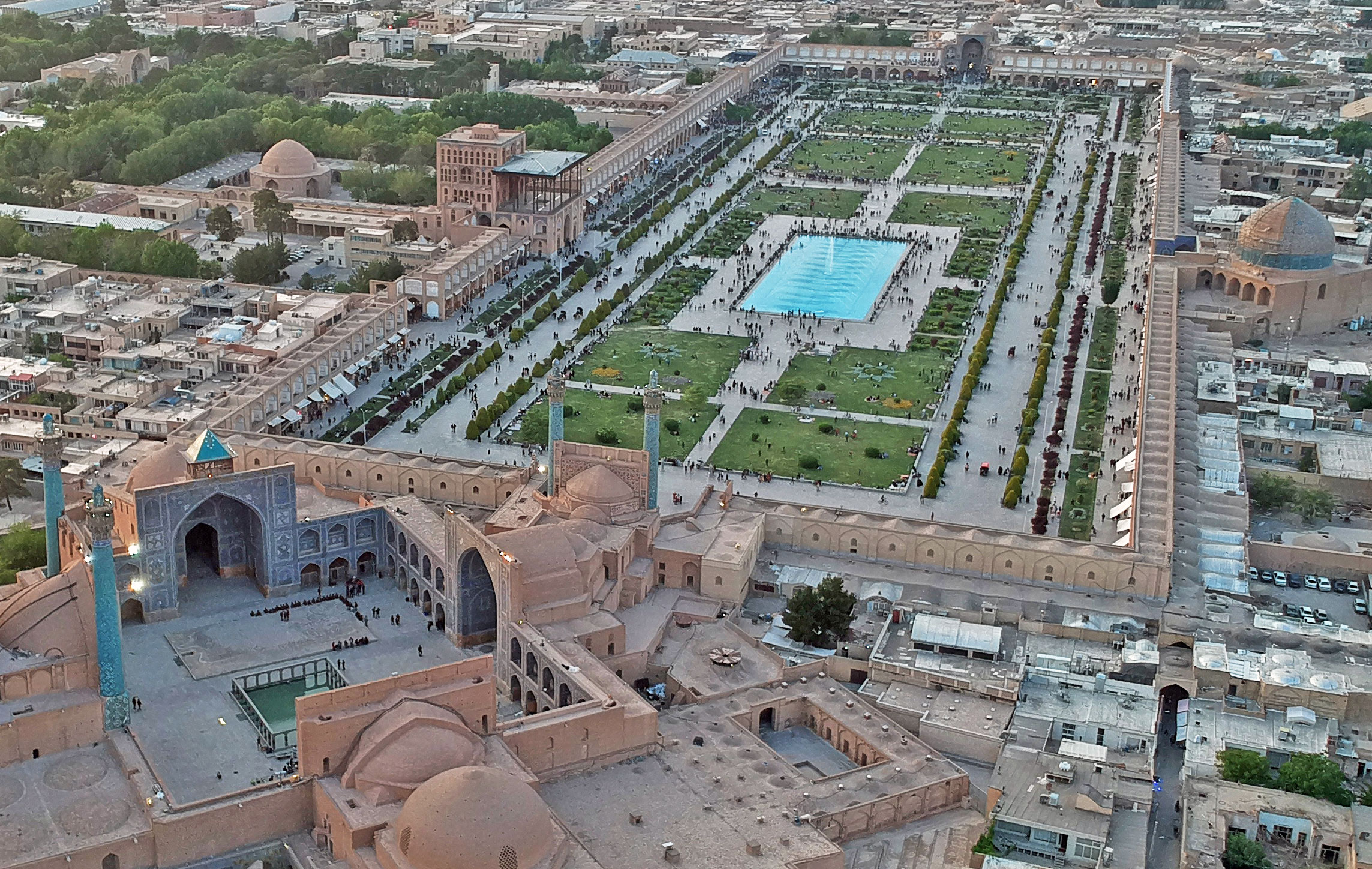
Aerial image collage of the Naqsh-e Jahan Square, with the Shah Mosque in the foreground showing the difference in orientation between the entrance and the mosque, 2019

The Shah Mosque is said to contain 18 million bricks and 475,000 tiles. The main block of the building measures around 100 by 130 metres (330 by 430 ft). It employs the four-iwan plan that was common for Iranian congregational mosques. This had been a regular feature of Iranian mosques since the Seljuk era, when it was introduced into this type of building, notably in the older Jameh Mosque of Isfahan. Accordingly, the mosque contains a spacious rectangular courtyard in the center that is surrounded by four monumental iwan portals. The northern iwan opens from the vestibule, the lateral iwans to the east and west lead into domed halls, and the southern iwan leads into the main prayer hall covered by the large dome. The façades that run between these iwans are occupied by two-story arcades.

In addition to this, the main prayer hall is flanked on either side by two rectangular hypostyle halls with vaulted ceilings, which served as prayer halls in the winter and are entered via smaller vaulted portals. Occupying the two southern corners of the building are two long rectangular courtyard structures which served as madrasas. An annex is also attached to the east side of the vestibule, consisting of a domed hall followed by another rectangular courtyard structure. This contained latrines and ablutions facilities.

One of the distinctive features of a mosque is the minaret, and the Shah Mosque has four. In addition to the two minarets over the entrance portal, two more minarets flank the iwan leading into the main prayer hall. In Iranian mosques, tall minarets were considered unsuitable for the call to prayer. Instead, architects added an aedicule, known in Persian as a guldasta ("bouquet") for this particular purpose, which in the Shah Mosque stands on top of the west iwan facing the courtyard.

The main prayer hall is covered by a huge dome reaching to a height of 52 metres (171 ft) and a diameter of around 25 metres (82 ft). It has a double-shelled structure, inspired by earlier Timurid domes, with a difference of 14 metres (46 ft) between the two shells. The dome rests on a drum and a sixteen-sided base that transitions to the square hall below. Inside the hall is the mihrab, a niche with a large marble tablet 3.0 metres (10 ft) tall and 0.91 metres (3 ft) wide on the southwestern wall, indicating the qibla. Above it, the Shah's men had placed a gold-encrusted cupboard of allow wood. It held two relics: a Quran, said to have been copied by Imam Reza, and the bloodstained robe of Imam Hussain. Although never displayed, the robe was said to have magical powers; lifted on the end of a pike in the battle field, the belief was that it could rout an enemy.

The mosque is also a marvel in acoustic engineering, with the echo of the dome allowing for prayer to be heard throughout the mosque.

Main elements of the mosque

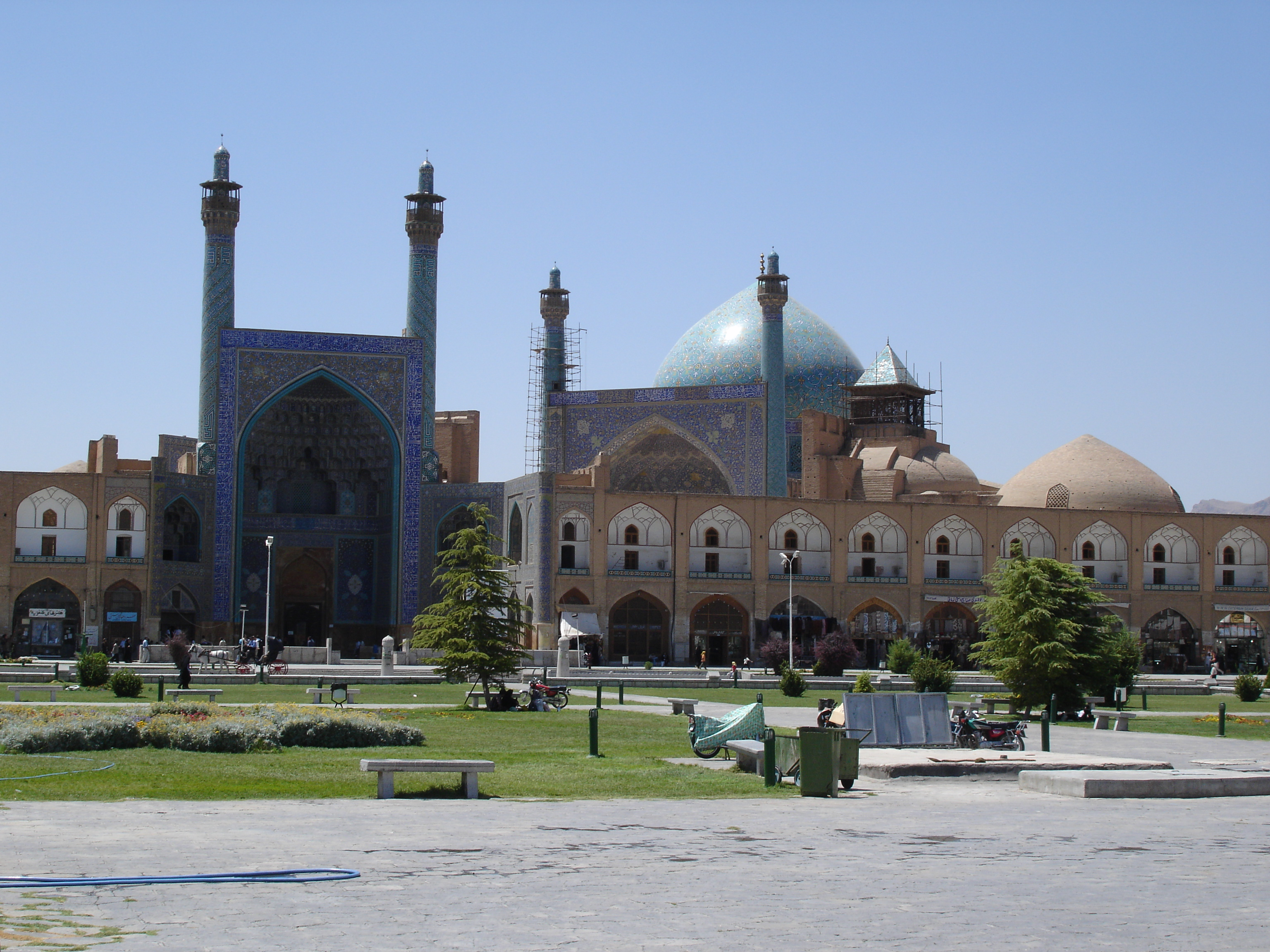
View of the mosque from Naqsh-e Jahan Square

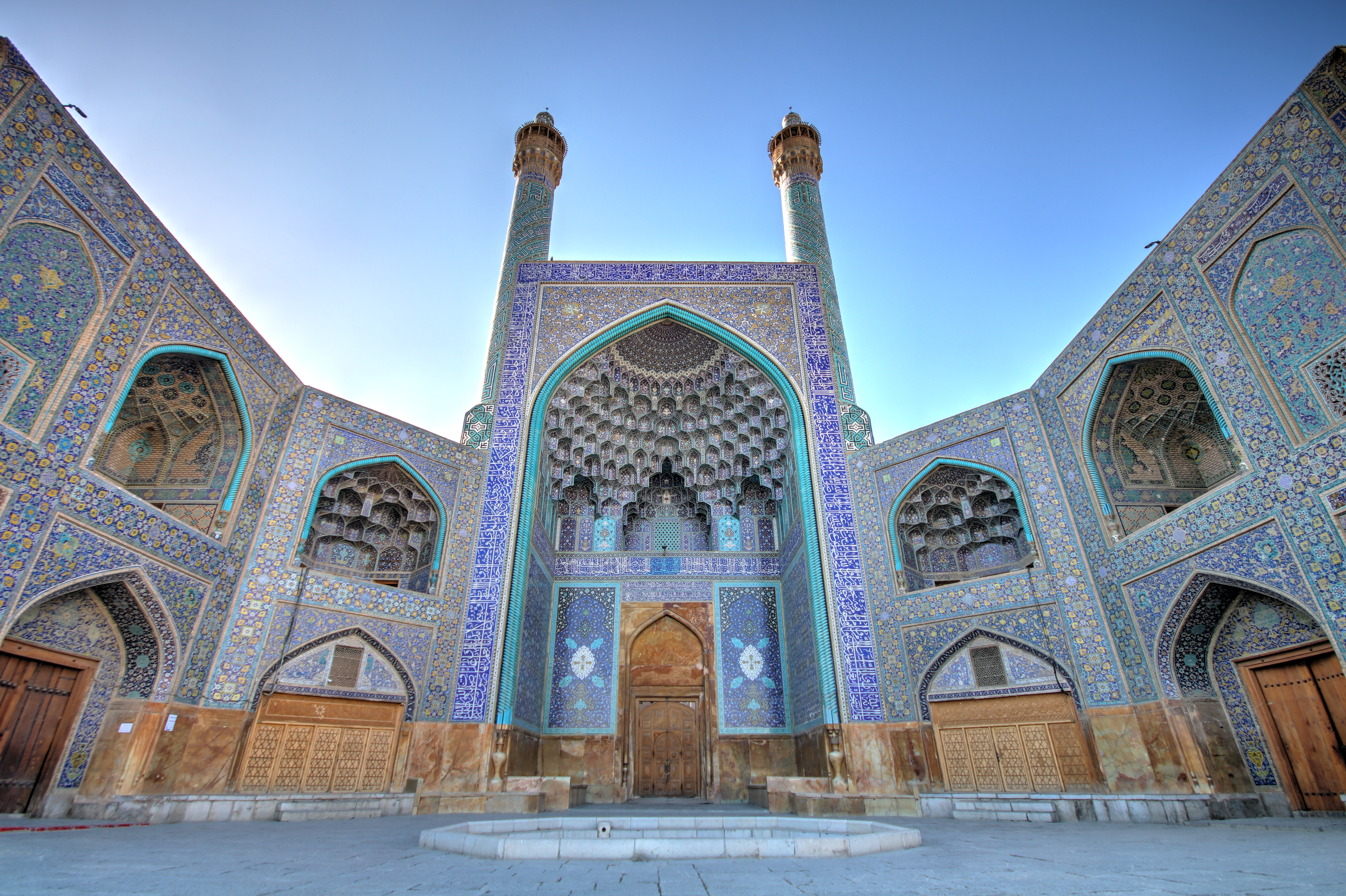
Entrance iwan of the mosque

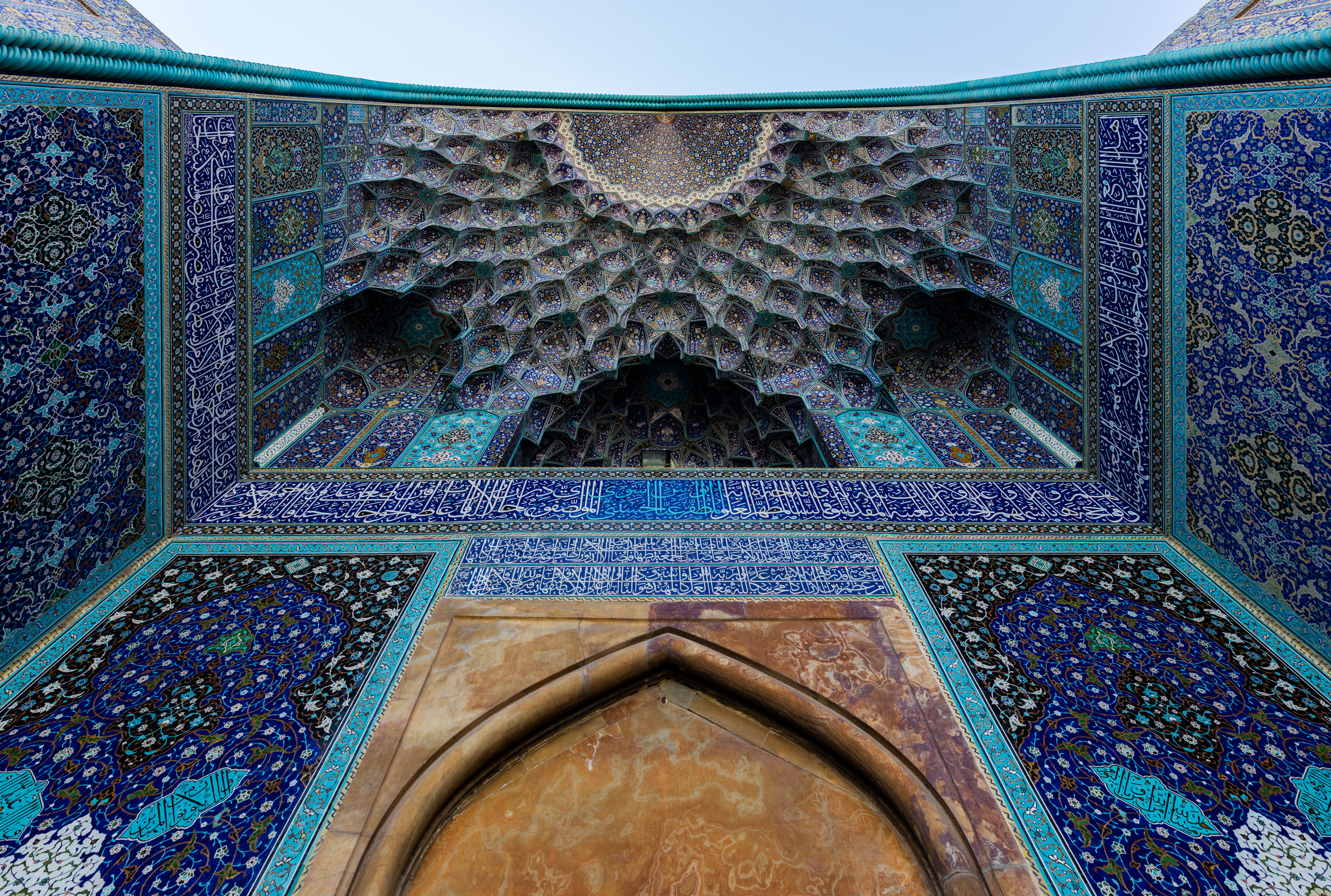
View from below of the muqarnas over the entrance

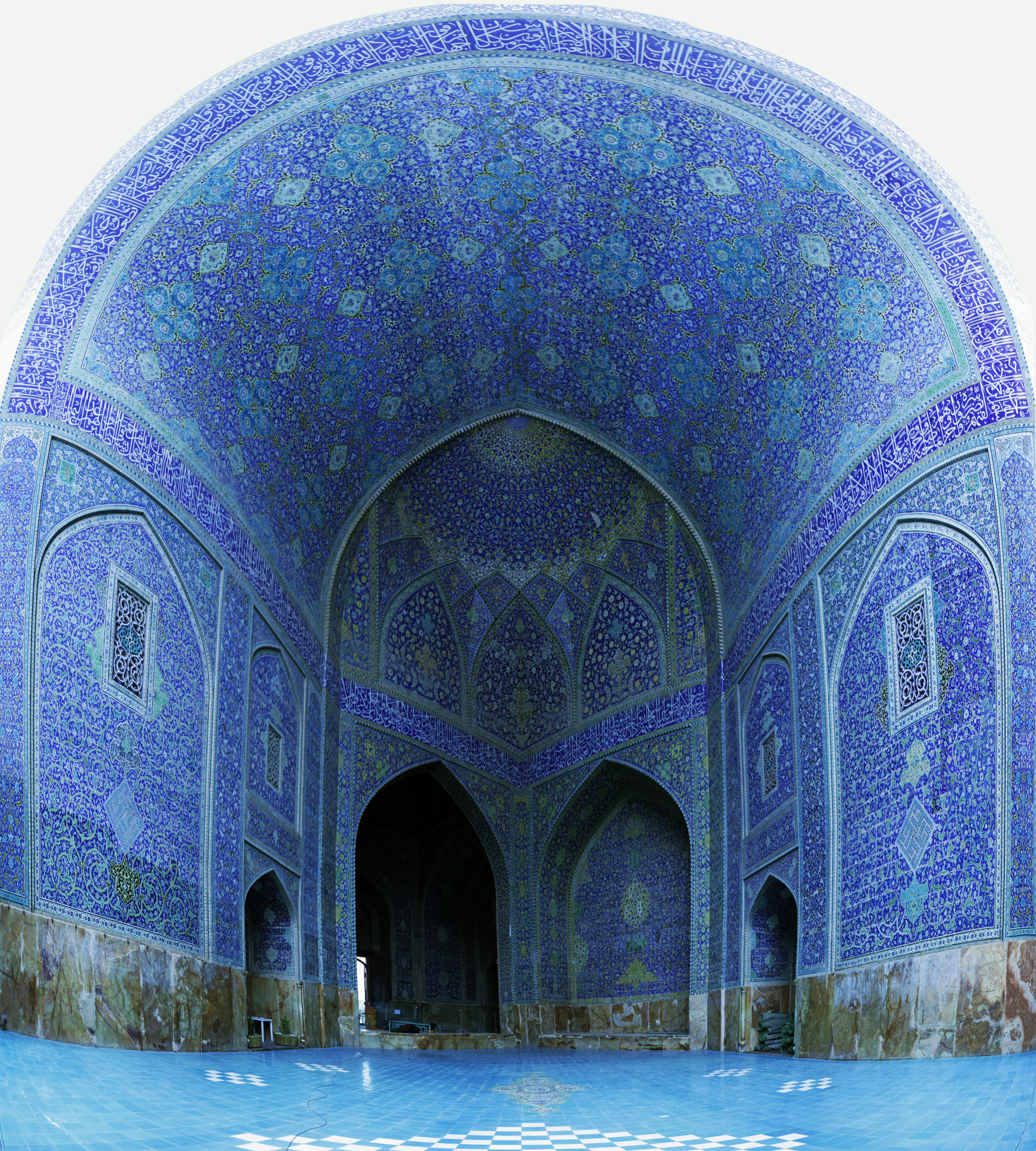
Panoramic photo of the entrance vestibule leading to the courtyard

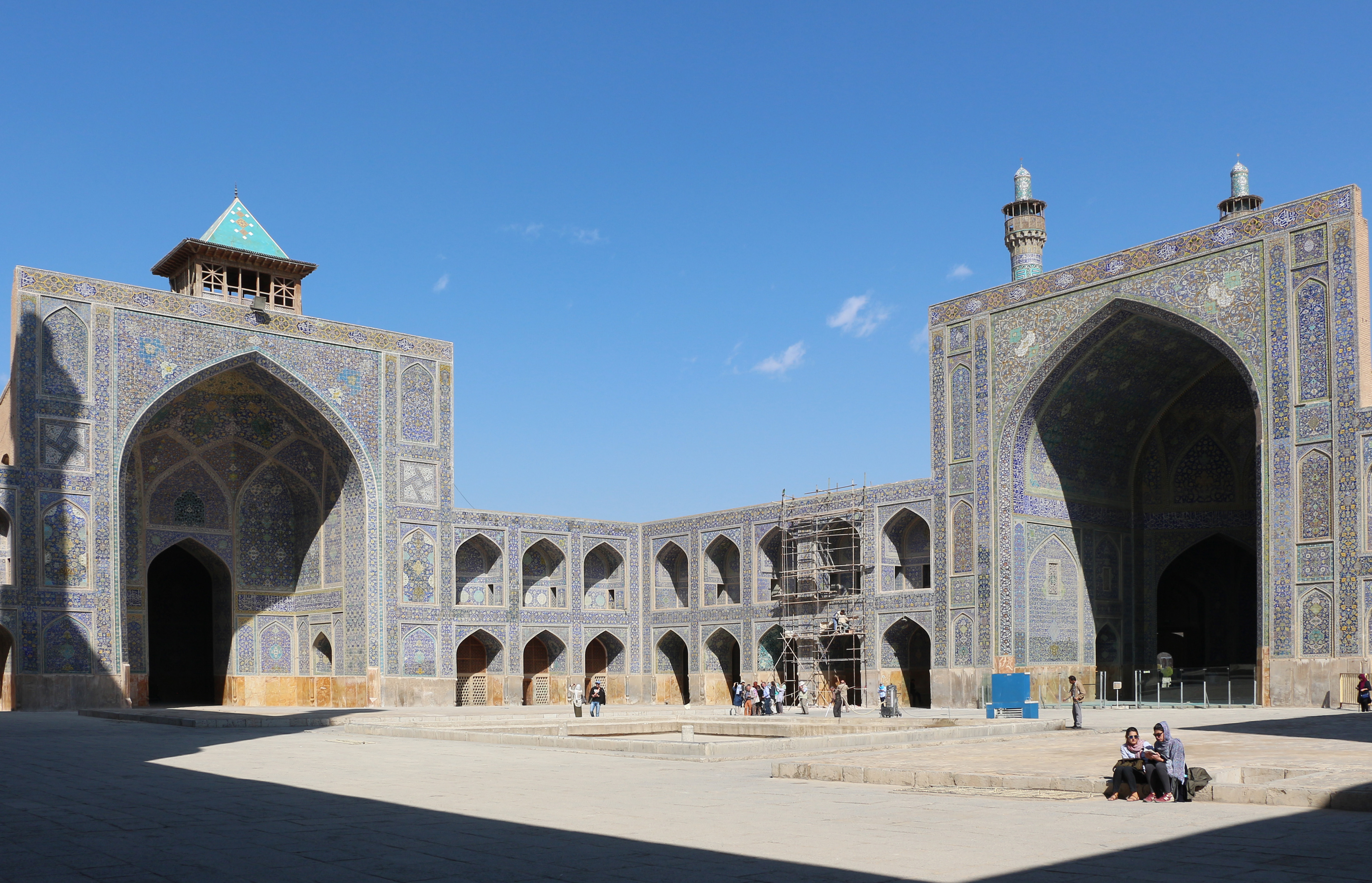
Main courtyard with four-iwan layout (west iwan on the left, north iwan on the right)

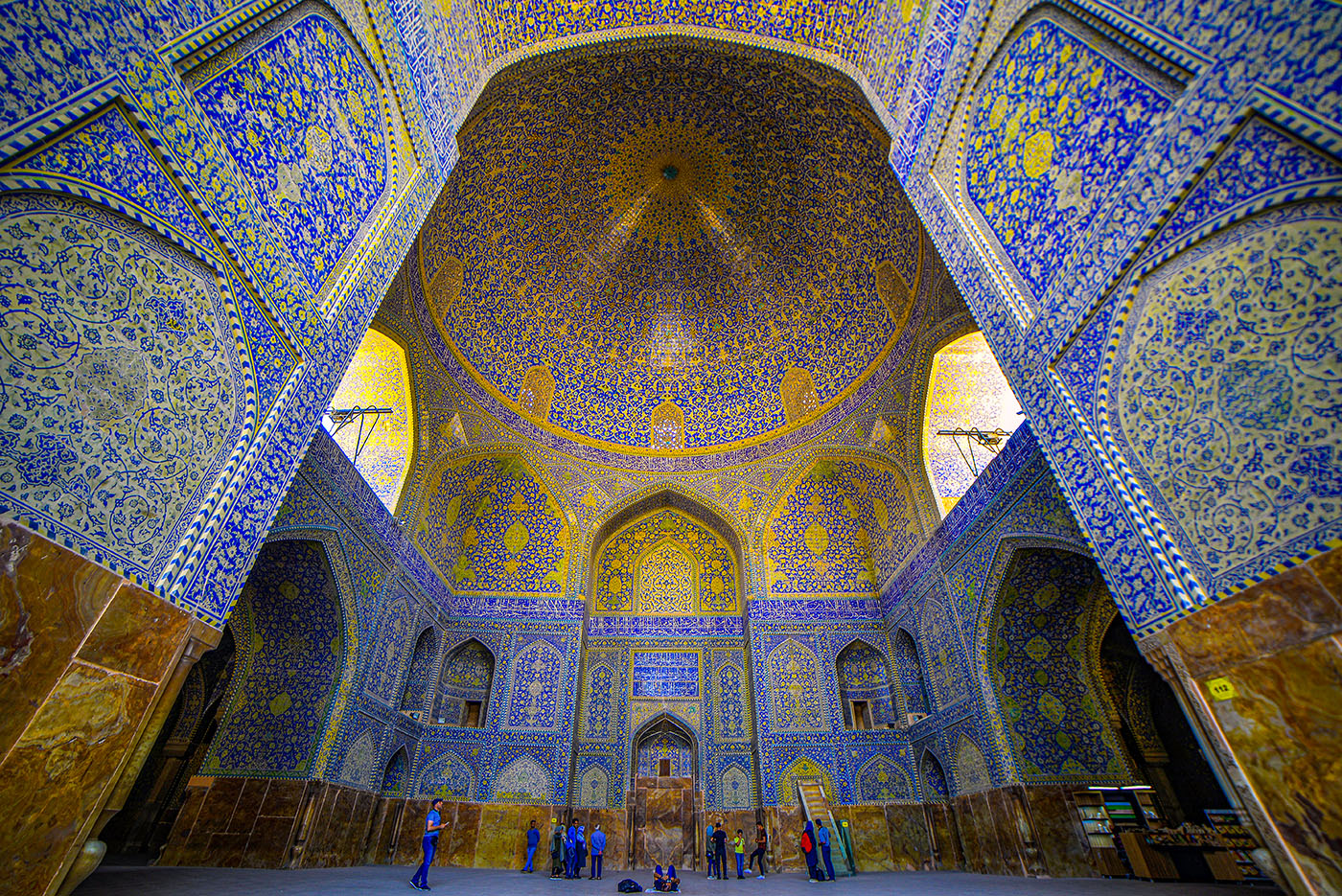
The main domed prayer hall

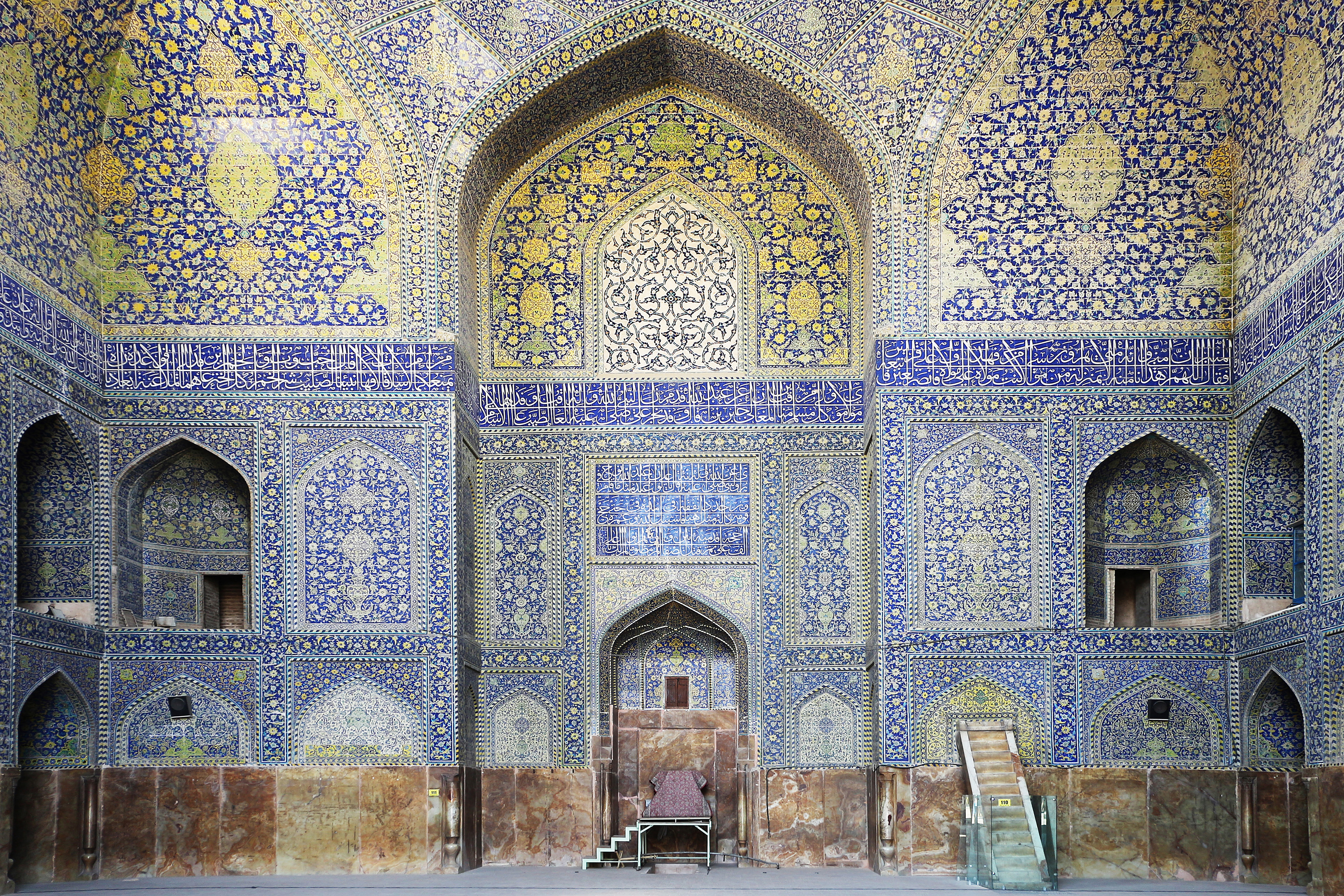
View of the mihrab (center) and minbar (right) in the main prayer hall

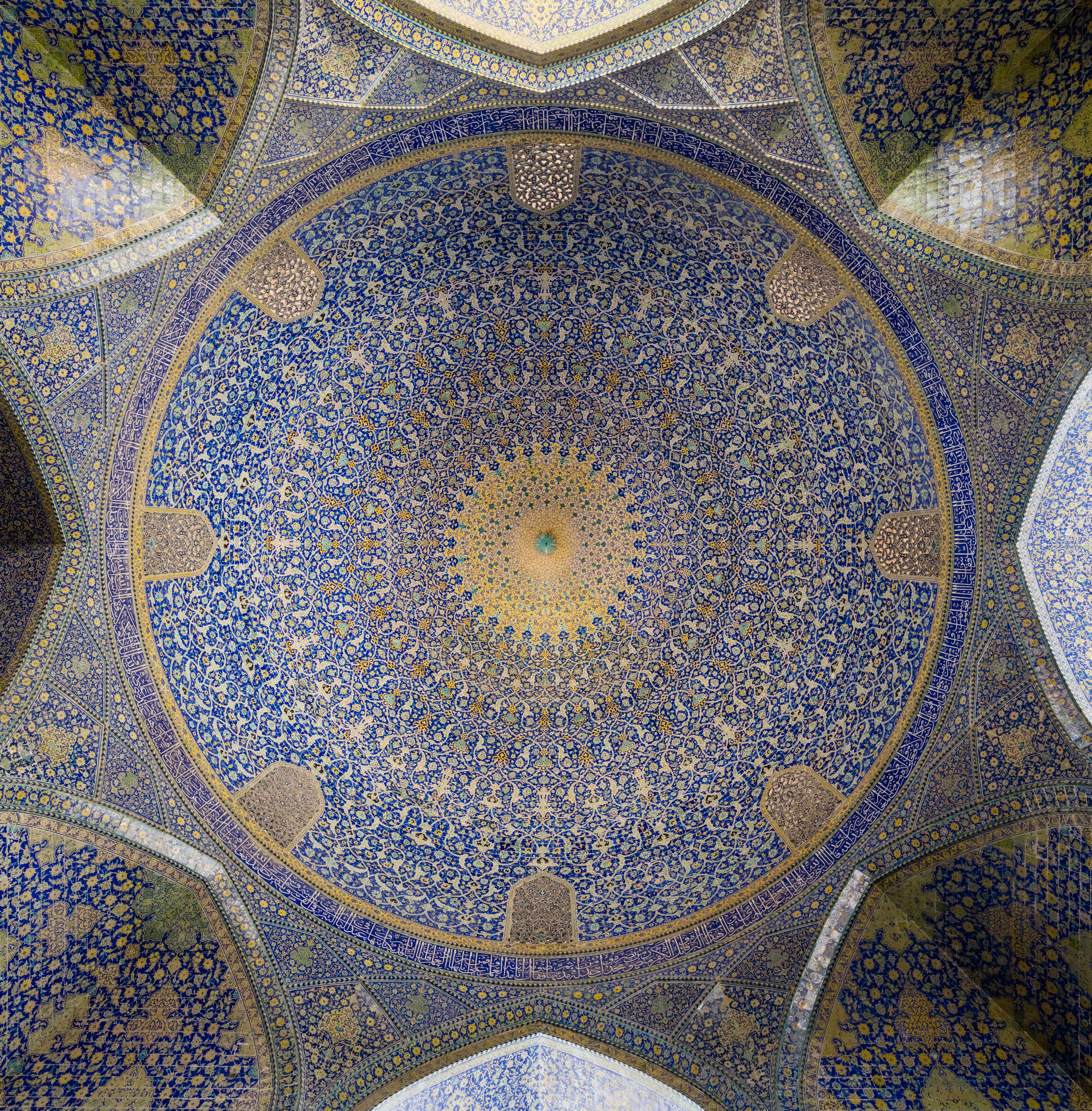
Interior view of the main dome

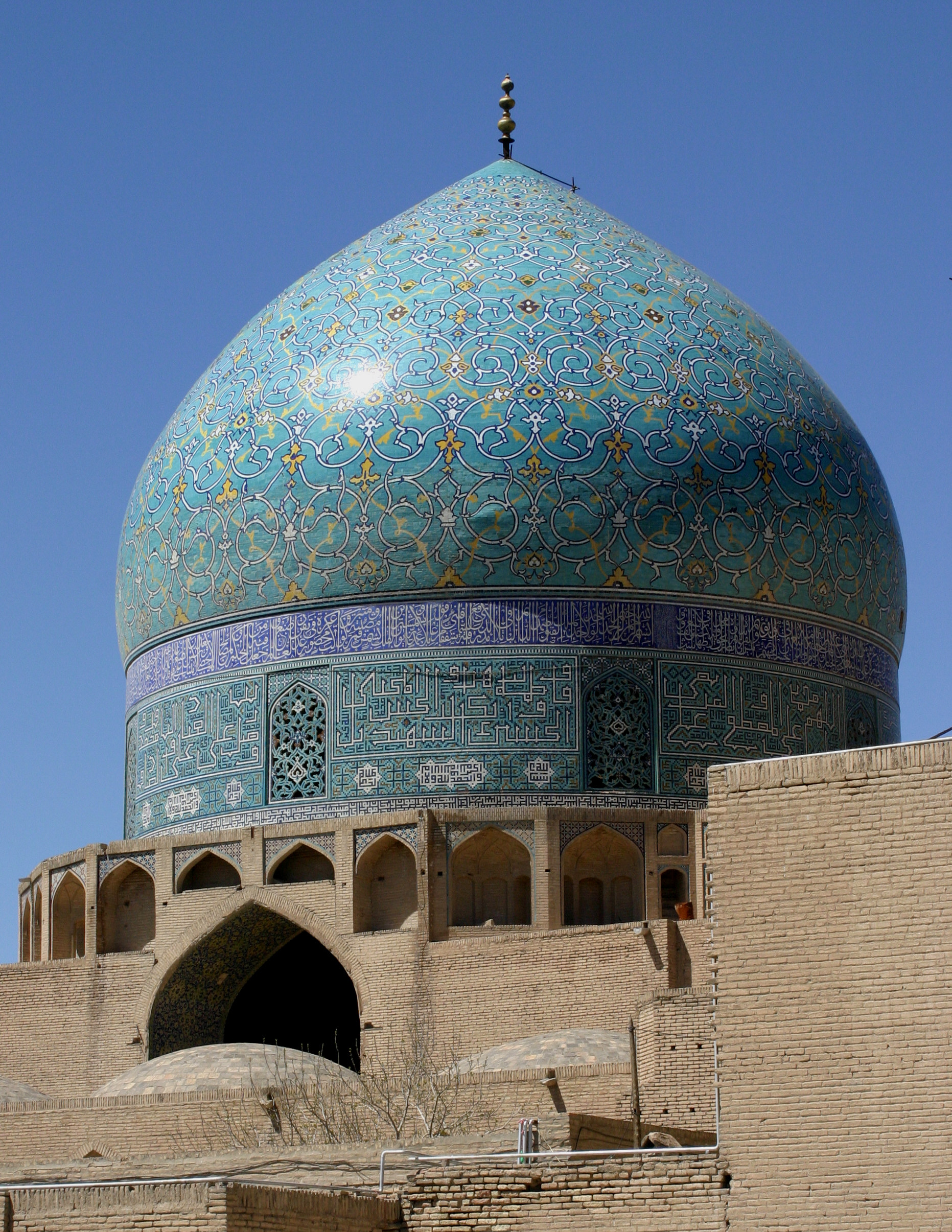
Exterior view of the main dome, covered in tiles

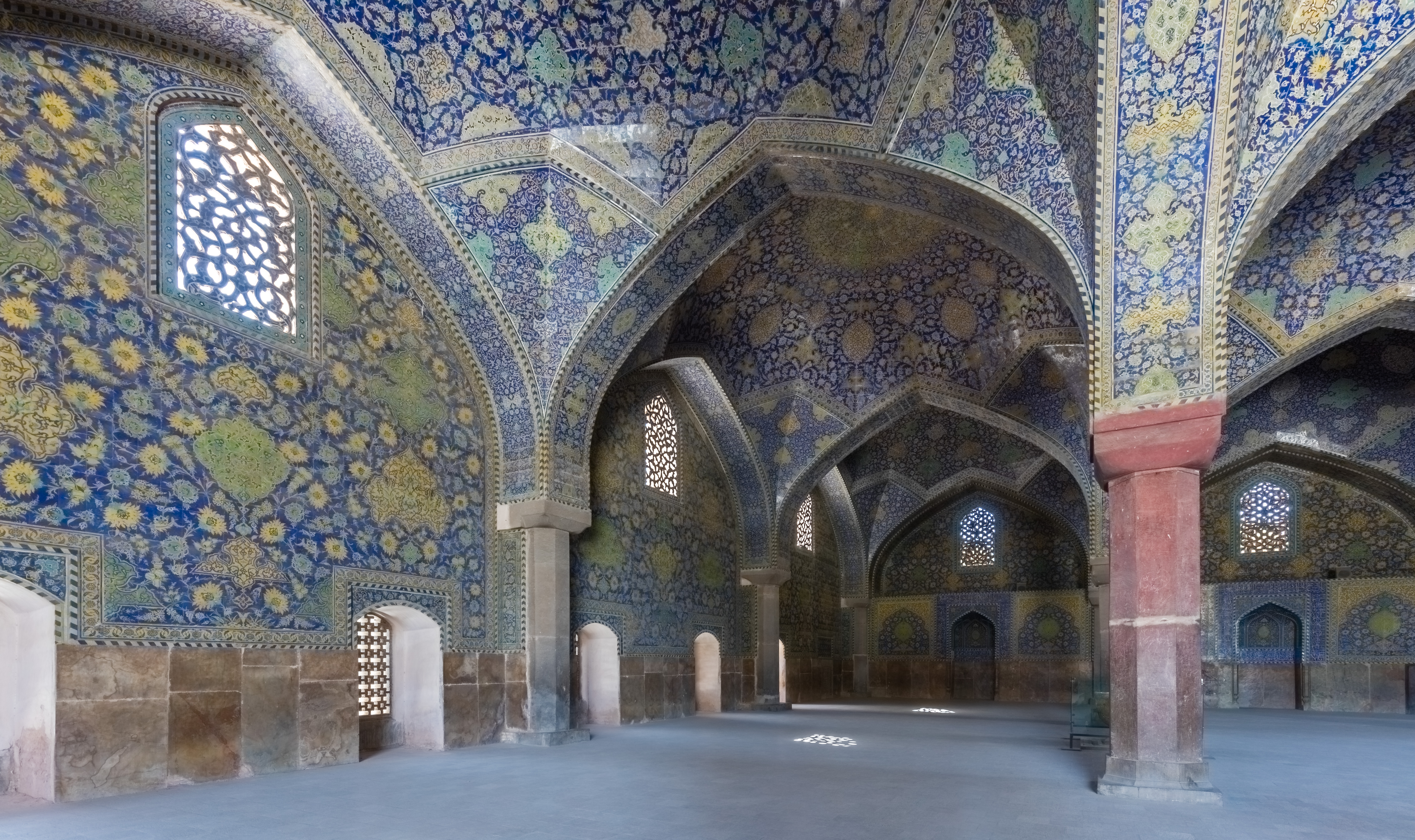
The winter prayer hall, built in hypostyle form

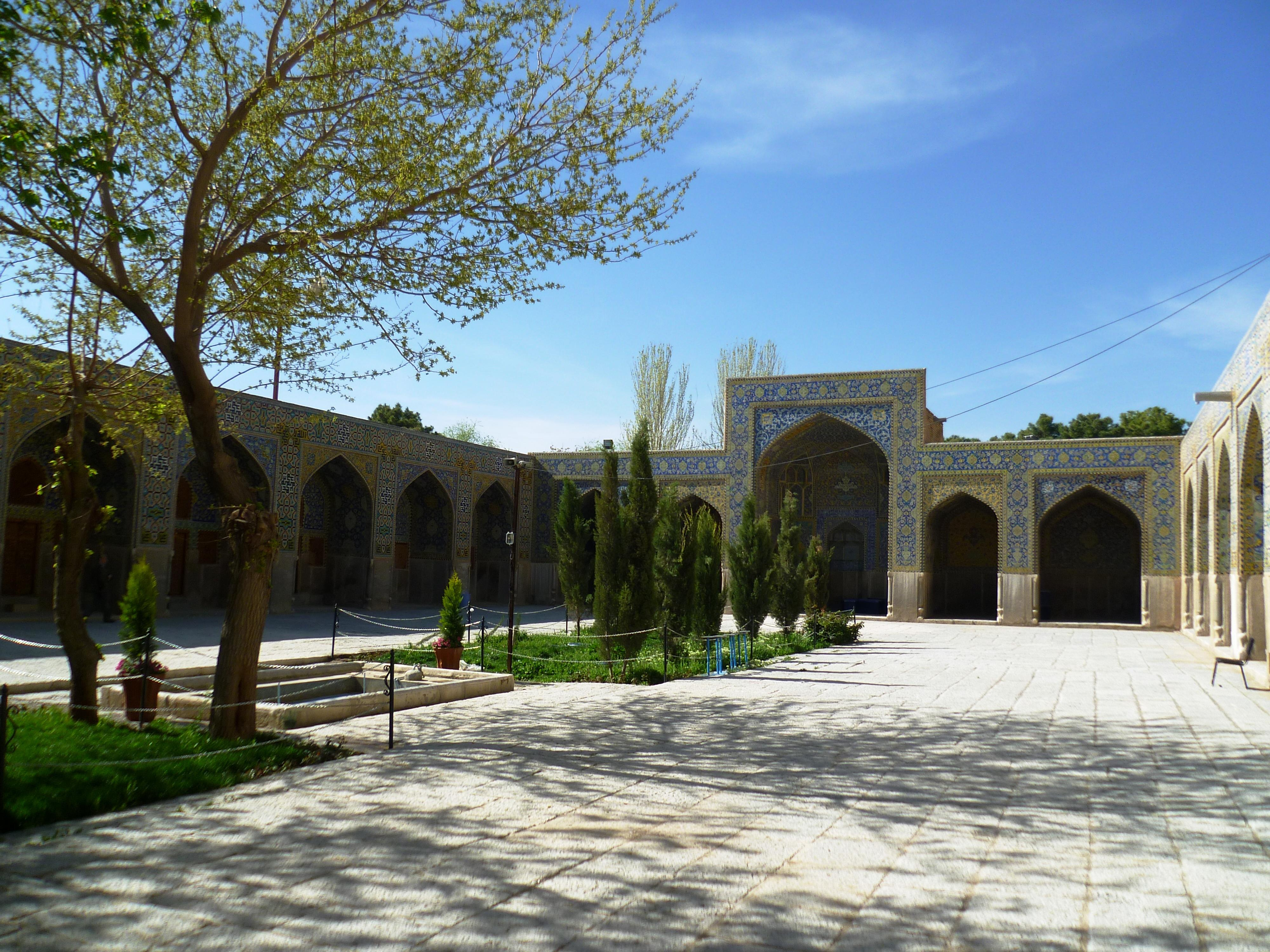
One of the two madrasas attached to the mosque

=== Decoration ===
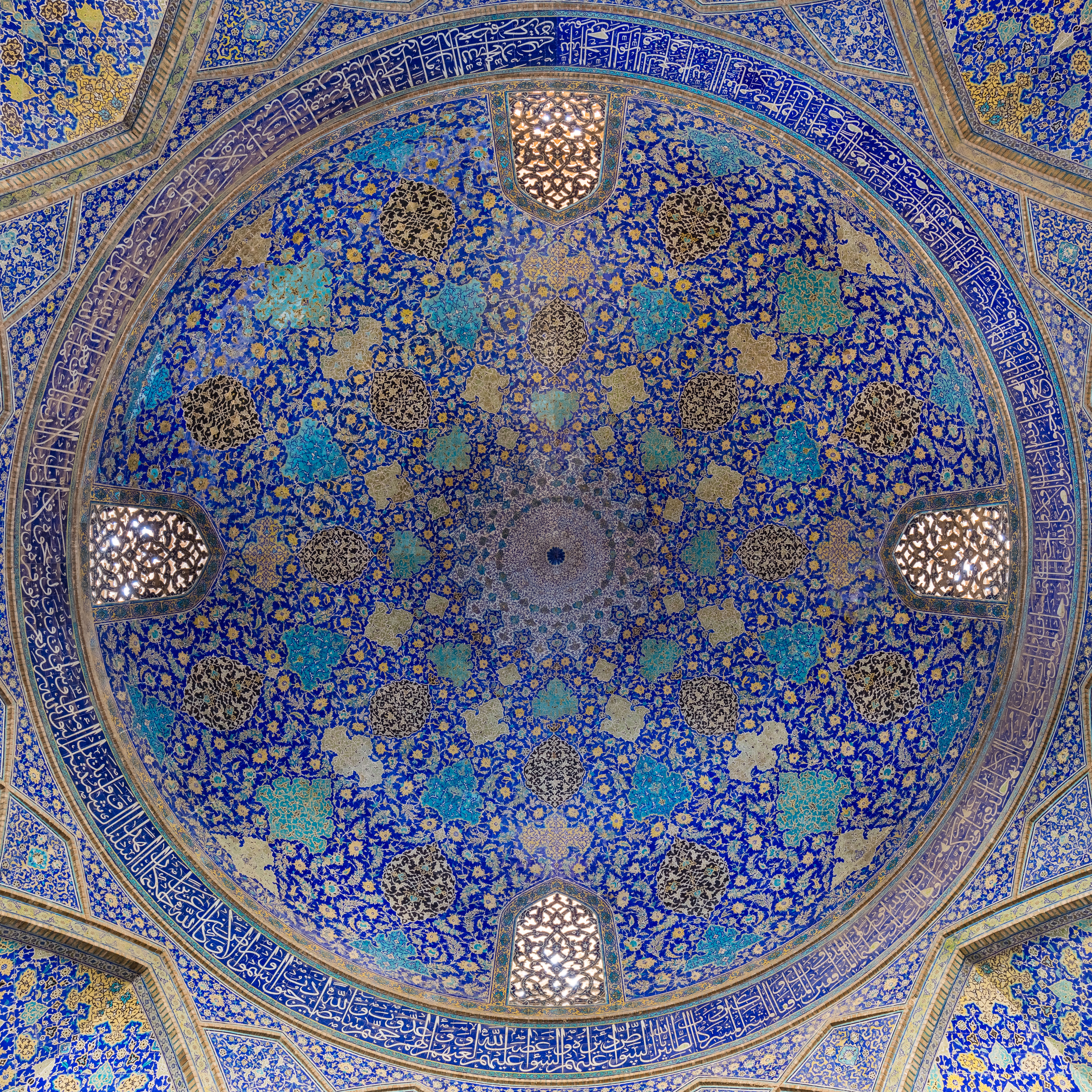
Interior of the domed chamber on the east side of the courtyard, covered with polychrome tiles

The mosque employed the new haft rangi ('seven-colour') style of tilework. Earlier mosques and monuments had made use of tile mosaic, a slow and expensive process where tiny pieces are cut from monochrome tiles and assembled to create intricate designs. In the haft rangi method, single tiles were painted with multiple colors simultaneously and then fired. This process was cheaper and quicker, while also allowing for a wider range of colors. According to 17th-century traveler Jean Chardin, the low humidity of the local environment made the colors more vivid and the contrasts between the different patterns stronger than what could be achieved in Europe, where the colors of tiles turned dull and lost their appearance. Still, most contemporary and modern writers regard the tile work of the Shah Mosque as inferior in both quality and beauty to those covering the nearby Lotfallah Mosque, the latter often referred to by contemporary Iranian historians, such as Iskandar Munshi, as "the mosque of great purity and beauty". The architects also employed a great deal of marble, which they gathered from a marble quarry in nearby Ardestan.

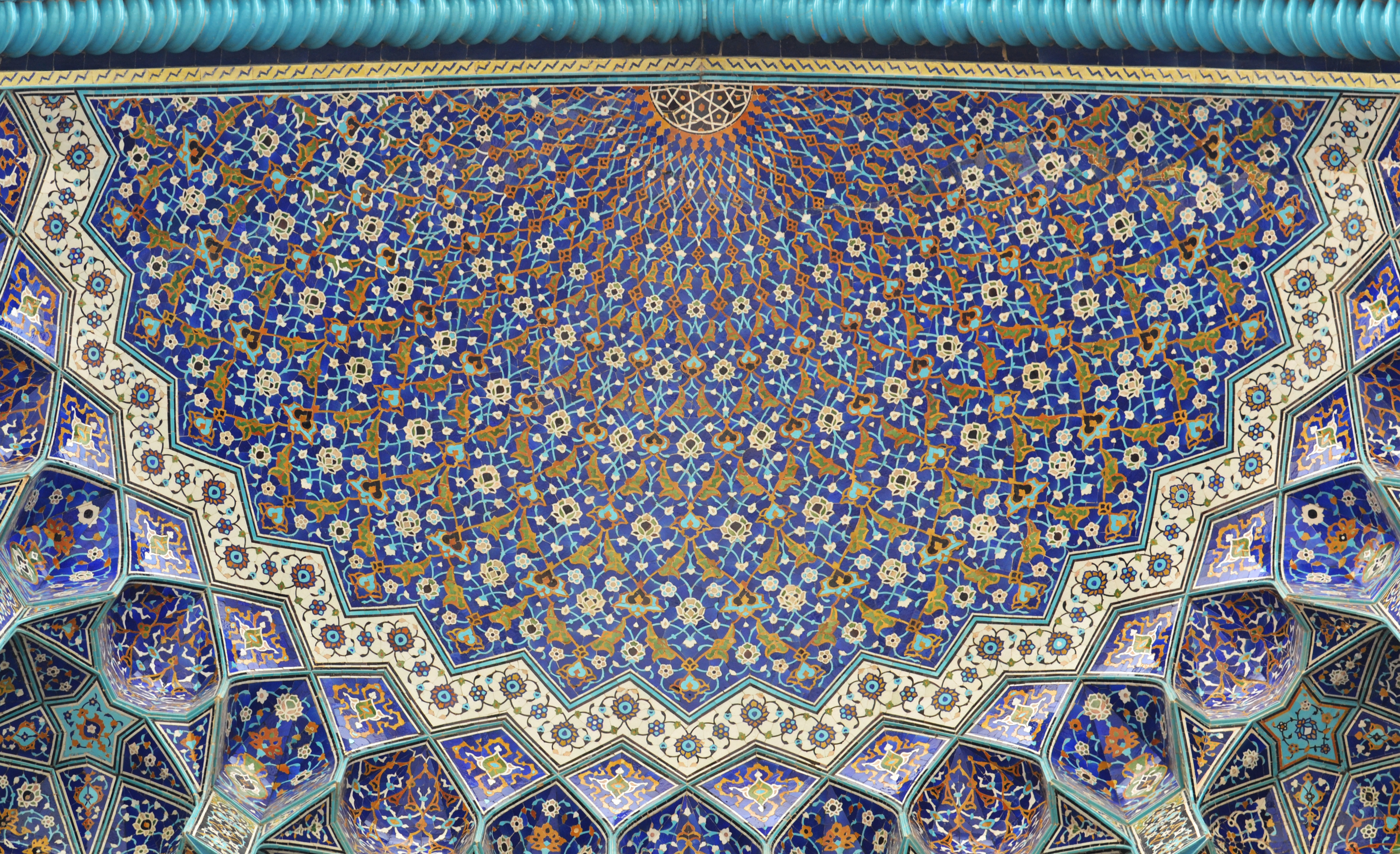
Detail of tilework at the top of the entrance iwan

The highest-quality tiles are found on the entrance portal of the mosque, which employ a repertoire of seven colours: dark blue, light blue, white, black, yellow, green and beige. Framing the iwan around its edge is a wide inscription band containing religious texts execute in white thuluth script on a dark blue ground. In the rest of the mosque, the tiles are predominantly blue, except in the winter prayer halls, which were later redecorated with tiles of yellow-green.

== See also ==
- Shia Islam in Iran
- List of mosques in Iran
- Chehel Sotoun
- List of historical structures in Isfahan province
- Persian domes
