= Tajlu Khanum =

Principal consort of Ismail I (c. 1485–1540)

Tajlu Khanum تاجلو خانم
- Mahd-e Olyā
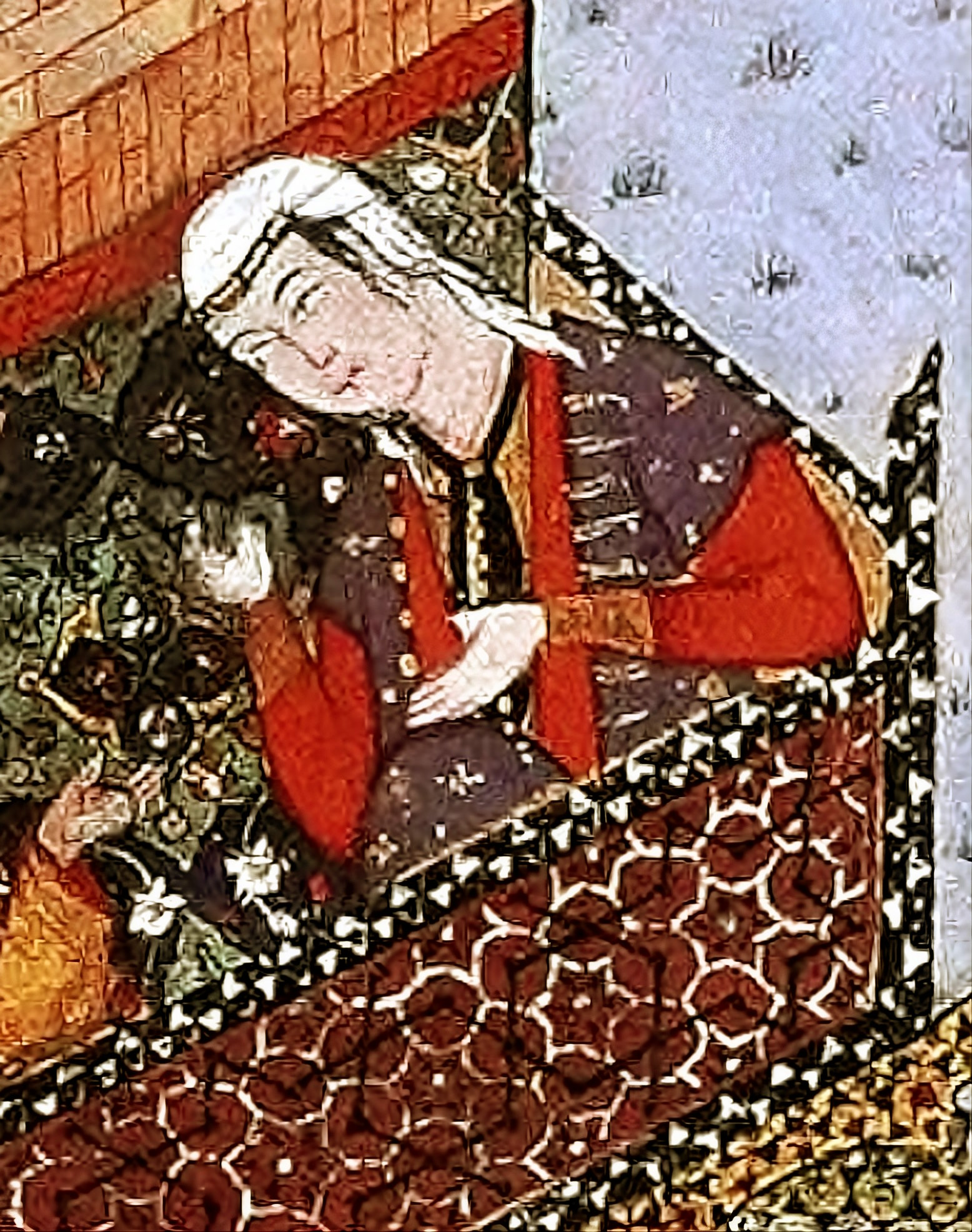
- Likely depiction of Tajlu Khanum, Shah Ismail's first Queen, and Shah Tahmasp's mother. Painted circa 1531.

Principal consort of the Safavid Iran
- Tenure: 1504–1524

Queen Mother of Safavid Iran
- Tenure: 1524–1540
- Predecessor: Alamshah Halime Begum
- Successor: Sultanum Begum
- Born: c. 1485
- Died: 1540 (aged 54–55); Shiraz, Safavid Iran
- Burial: Bibi Dokhtaran mausoleum, Shiraz
- Spouse: Kiya Husayn II; Ismail I
- Issue: Tahmasp I Bahram Mirza Safavi; Pari Khan Khanum; Mahinbanu Khanum
Names
- Persian: شاه بگی خانم; English: Shah-Begi Khanum
- Tribe: Mawsillu
- Dynasty: Safavid (by marriage)
- Father: Mihmad beg Mawsillu
- Mother: Daughter of Ya'qub Beg

Tajlu Khanum (Persian: تاجلو خانم) or Tajli Begum (تاجلی بیگم), also known by her title of Shah-Begi Khanum (شاه بگی خانم), was a Turkoman princess from the Mawsillu tribe of the Aq Qoyunlu confederation. She was the principal wife of Shah Ismail, and the mother of Tahmasp I. She was one of the most powerful and influential queens of the Safavid Empire, playing important political and social roles. She held real power behind the throne for ten years during Shah Ismail's reign and for at least eight years during Shah Tahmasp's reign.

== Family ==
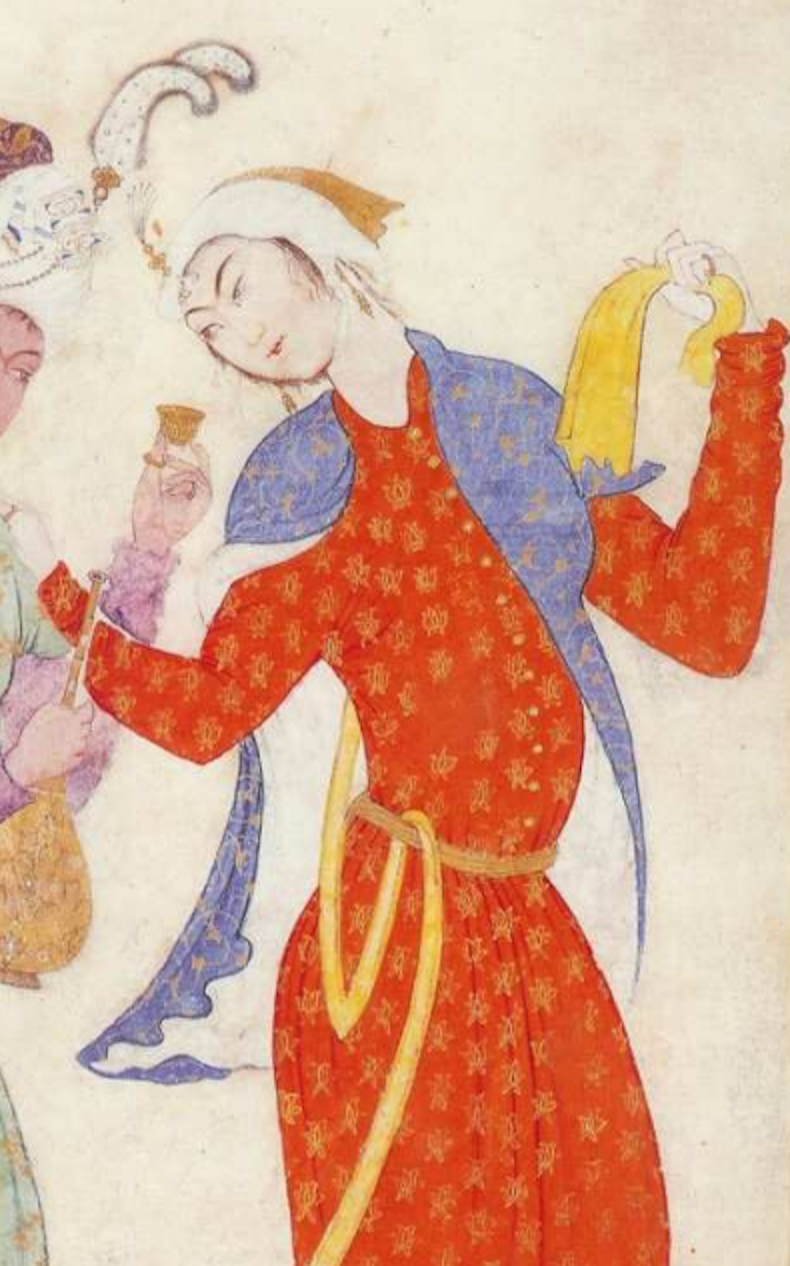
Likely depiction of Mahinbanu Soltanum, daughter of Tajlu Khanum with Shah Ismail. Qazvin, circa 1544.

While Italian writer Angiolello and Iranian historian Manuchihr Parsaʹdust agree that she was a granddaughter of the Aq Qoyunlu ruler Yaqub (r. 1478–1490) via a daughter, John Woods proposed her paternal lineage with Mihmad Beg being her father and Amir Hamza being her grandfather. Jean Aubin on the other hand, proposed Bakr Beg Mawsillu as her maternal grandfather. She also had a sister named Beksi Khanum.

== Marriage ==
According to Angiolello and Ramusio, Shah Ismail I of the Safavid dynasty (r. 1501–1524) married Tajlu Khanum after defeating the Aq Qoyunlu ruler Murad ibn Ya'qub in 1503, but according to the Safavid-era historians such as Budaq Monshi Qazvini, she was the wife of the Afrasiyabid ruler Kiya Husayn II, who had, during the dissolution of the Aq Qoyunlu confederation, expanded his rule from western Mazandaran into parts of Persian Iraq. Ismail I invaded the latter's territories and put an end to his rule in 1504, where he afterwards took Tajlu Khanum into his harem.

She became Ismail's most beloved wife, and was the only wife of the shah who was skilled in swordsmanship and always accompanied her husband in his battles. She gave birth to two sons, Tahmasp Mirza and Bahram Mirza Safavi, and two daughters, Pari Khan Khanum and Mahinbanu Khanum.

Her supposed capture at Battle of Chaldiran was a major source of controversy among Safavid and Ottoman historians. While Ottoman sources wrote that she was captured during battle and even conversed with Selim I, according to Safavid sources she was lost but found by Mirza Shah Hossein, who because of this rose to the rank of wakil in the Safavid court. According to Roger Savory, it was Behruzeh Khanum, another wife of Ismail I who was captured and apparently later remarried.

== Political life ==
=== Queen consort ===
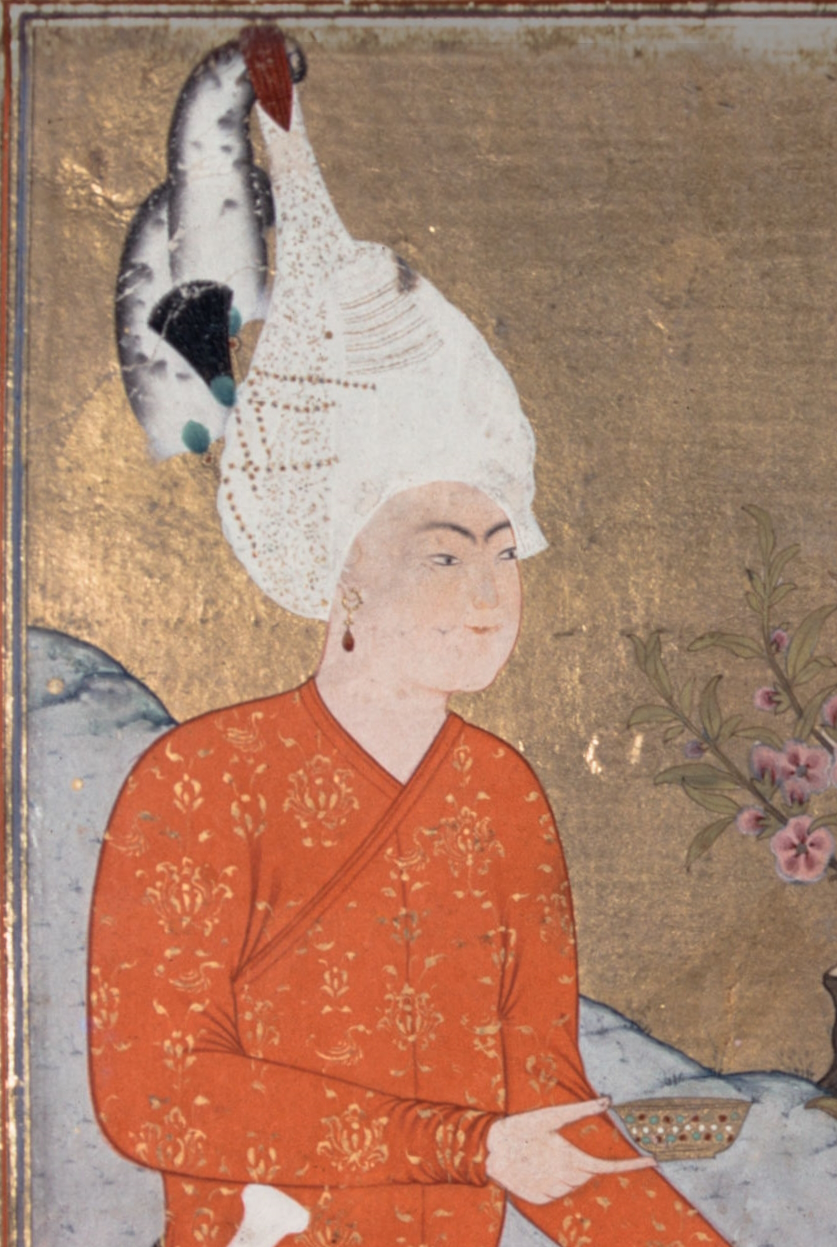
Likely contemporary portrait of Bahram Mirza, son of Tajlu Khanum, in Prince and Courtier, attributed to Dust Muhammad, circa 1540.

She was the daughter of Mohammad Beg and came from the Turkmens of Mosul. Although she was only 15 or 16 years old, she married Shah Ismail I in 1503. The wedding ceremony was held with great splendor in Tabriz in the year 906 AH. As a legally wedded wife of Shah Ismail, she became the second queen consort of the Safavid court. This marriage resulted in four children: Tahmasp Mirza, Bahram Mirza, Pari Khan Khanum, and Mahin Banu Khanum.

She was considered beautiful, intelligent, and perceptive. Shah Ismail composed poetry for her and would bring her on horseback rides and to practice archery. She is described as having received significant favor and attention from Ismail I, and her status and influence were such that court nobles or officials who faced difficulties or incurred the Shah's anger reportedly sought refuge with her to have their problems resolved.

In the incident of Shah Ismail's harsh treatment of Mirza Shah Hossein of Isfahan—when he had ordered the Qurchis not only to plunder his household but also to extract an additional one thousand tomans from him—Tajlu Begum intervened. It was then decided that Mirza should instead pay one hundred tomans to each of the Qurchis, and that they should not trouble him further. Thus, with great difficulty, Mirza gathered the required sum and paid it to the Qurchis.

She was an important advisor to her husband and later a powerful figure behind the throne of her son, Shah Tahmasp.

The author of Javāher al-Akhbār writes about her: She lived in a state of chastity and dignity until the end of the pious Shah's life, and the appointment and dismissal of amirs and ministers were carried out according to her will.

=== Queen mother ===
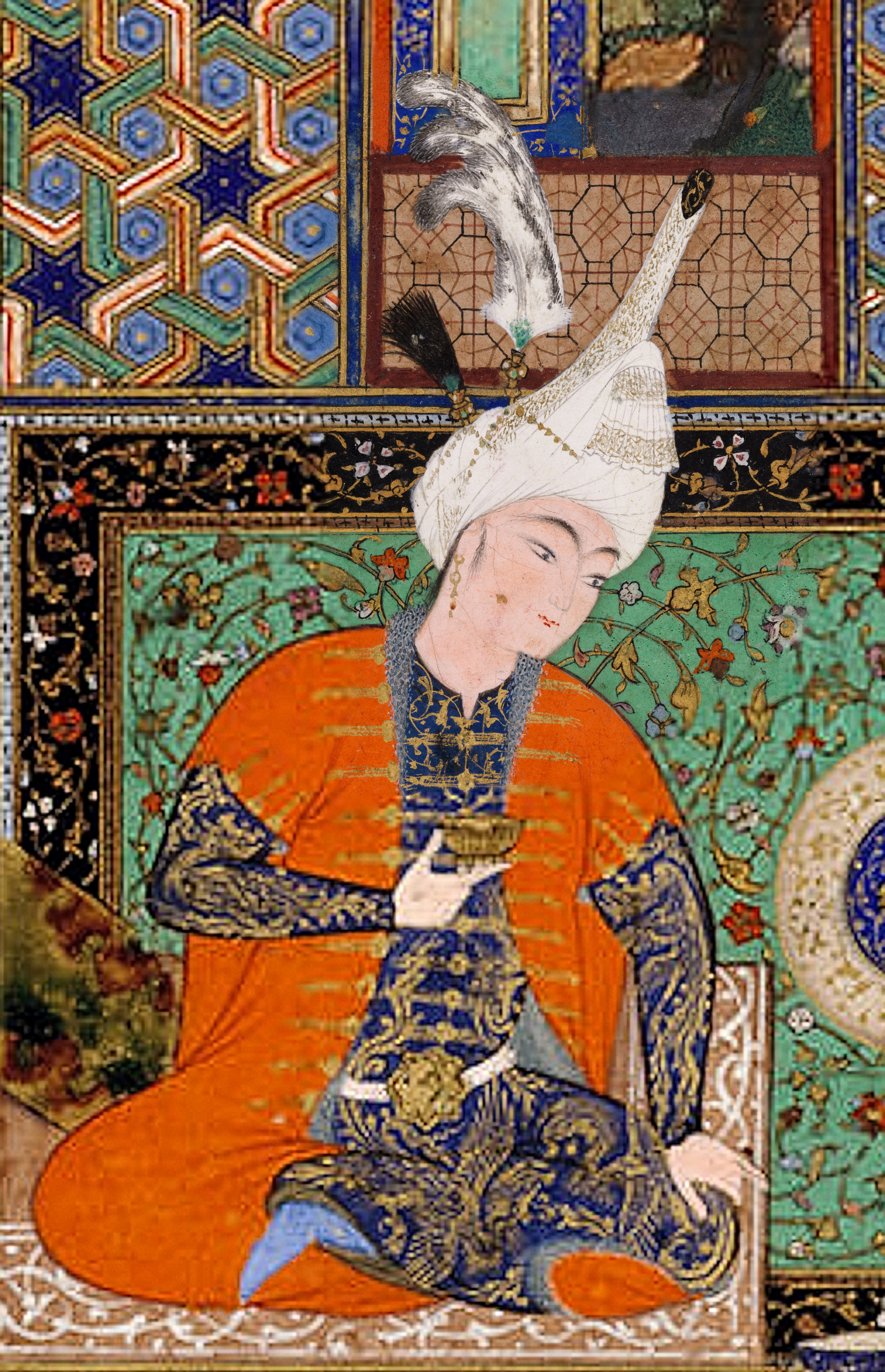
Shah Tahmasp, elder son of Tajlu Khanum, at his court. Nighttime in a City, by Mir Sayyid Ali. c. 1540, Tabriz (Sackler Museum, 1958.76).

In 1524, Shah Ismail died. With the assistance of Tajlu Begum, the nobles of the country and the Qizilbash leaders enthroned Tahmasp Mirza—who was then ten years old—as Shah Tahmasp I. Tajlu Begum became the queen mother and received the title Navab ‘Alayh. She also became the intermediary between the Shah and the courtiers, which is why Tahmasp called her Shah Begi Khanum, meaning the highest-ranking lady of the court. At the beginning of Shah Tahmasp's reign, Tajlu Begum had considerable influence over the court and even intervened in foreign affairs. For example, in 941 AH, she sent Sayyid Abdullah Laleh to negotiate peace with Ibrahim Pasha, the governor of Baghdad. Shah Tahmasp also apparently accepted his mother's regency.

During Shah Tahmasp's reign, Tajlu Khanum continued to be a refuge for the nobles and a point of reference for court officials. For instance, in the tribal conflicts of 931 AH, when Montasha Sultan captured Qazi Jahan, plundered him, and intended to kill him, Qazi Jahan was saved through her support. Similarly, at the beginning of Shah Tahmasp's reign, during disputes among the Teklu, Rumlu, and Ostajlu tribes, she served as the primary advisor and decision-maker for the leaders of these tribes. Later, when Chuhah Sultan gained independence in governmental affairs, he decided to eliminate Div Sultan Rumlu. Tajlu Khanum assisted him in this decision, and ultimately, Div Sultan was killed.

In 935 AH (approximately 1528–1529 AD), the fifth year of Shah Tahmasp's reign, the Shah decided to march an army to Khorasan to punish Ubaid Khan Uzbek. After assembling the army, he moved from Qazvin toward Khorasan and sent Tajlu Khanum, along with the women of the harem and household belongings, to Qom. After achieving victory in this campaign, the Shah ordered his secretaries to draft a victory report and sent a messenger to Qom to inform Tajlu Begum of the news.

He had intended to diminish the Qizilbash’s power over state affairs, but they became aware of the queen mother's plan. Fearing for their own power, they sought to create enmity between the Shah and his mother. By spreading the rumor that the queen mother intended to depose Shah Tahmasp and place Bahram Mirza on the throne, and that she wished to govern alone, they aroused the Shah's suspicion toward his mother. Ultimately, Tahmasp exiled his mother to Shiraz, and her personal estates were confiscated. During the journey, Tajlu Khanum fell ill, and she died in 1540 AD, only a few months after arriving in Shiraz. She was buried with respect in the Bibi Dokhtaran section of Shah Cheragh in Shiraz.

== Legacy ==
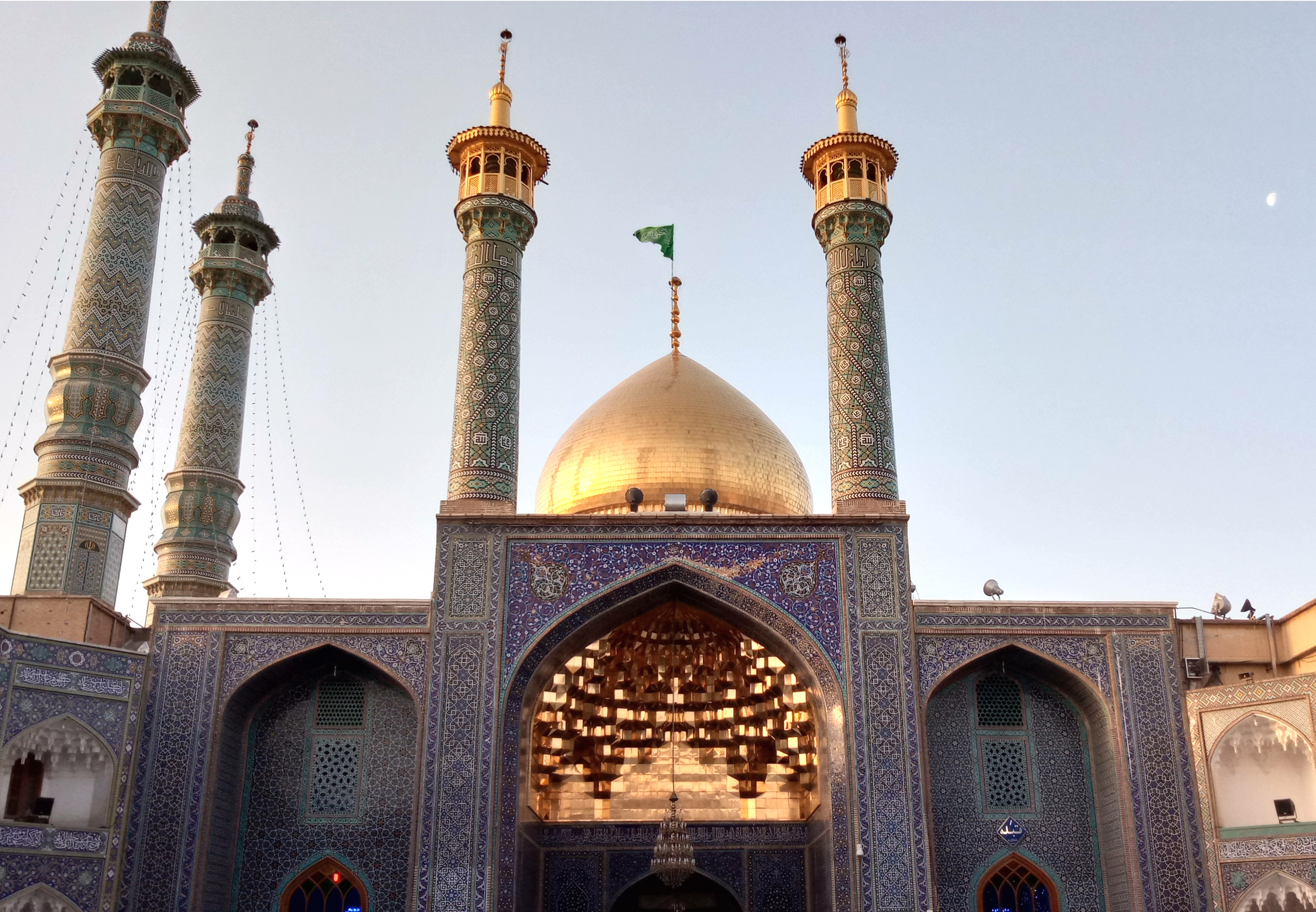
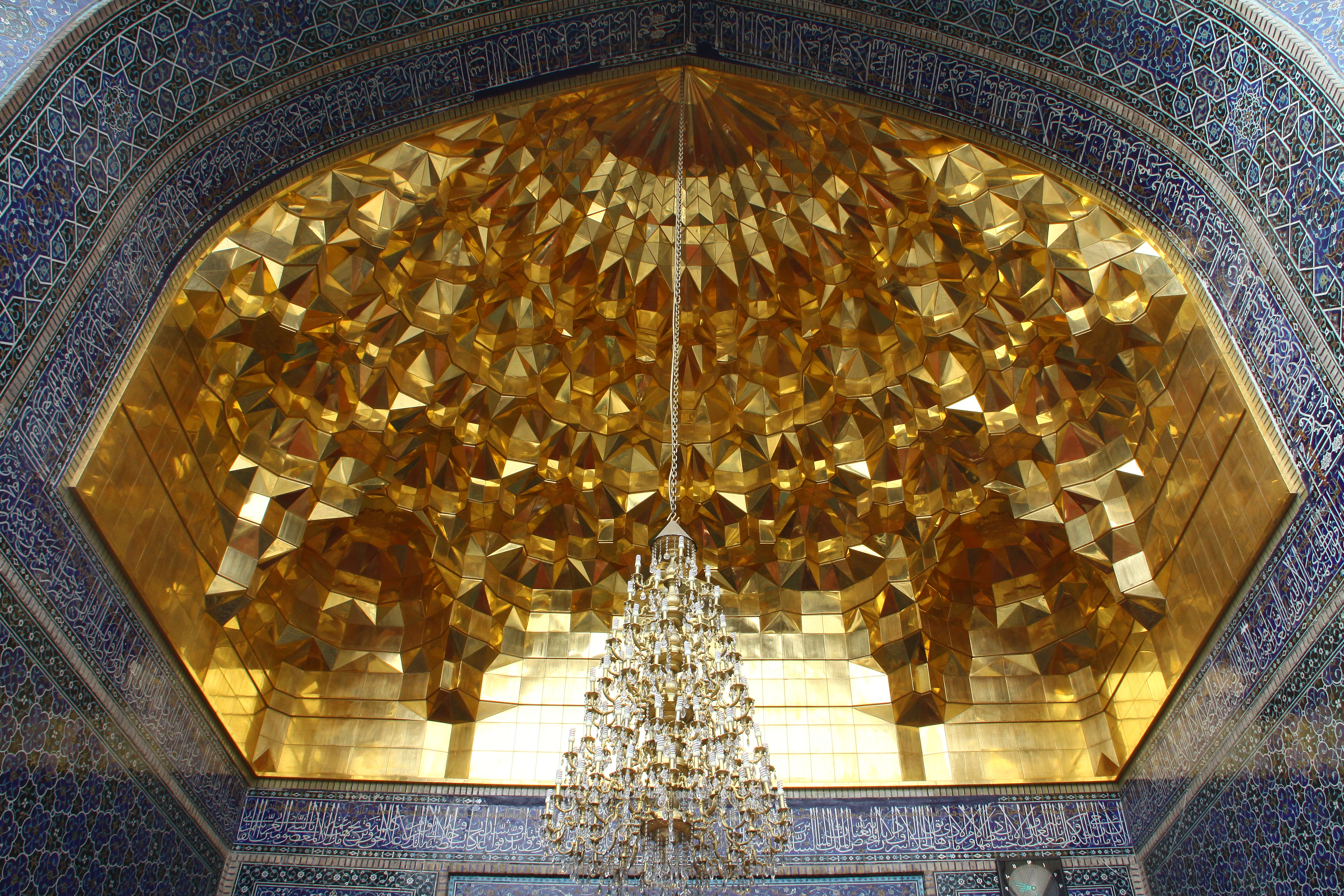
The Golden Iwan (with its muqarnas golden ceiling) and Golden Dome, commissioned ca. 1519 by Tajlu Khanum, at the Shrine of Fatima al-Masuma, Qom.

Tajlu Khanum financed the Fatima Masumeh Shrine in Qom in 1519 AD, commissioning the Golden Iwan (with its muqarnas golden ceiling) and rebuilding the Golden Dome. She dedicated the Golden Iwan to Shah Ismail with an inscription in light blue mosaic over the pinnacle of the arch, which gives Shah Ismail's name and laudatory attributes such as "the upholder of justice", "the guardian of the empire" and even "the Guide (Mahdi)", a title normally reserved to God and the twelfth Shi'i imam. She also built her husband Shah Ismail's tomb in Ardabil after his death in 1524, right next to the tomb of the Safavid ancestor Shayk Safi. She then supported Tahmasp Mirza's elevation to the throne in 1524.

In 1528 AD, Talju Khanum had to leave the harem and was sent to Qom by her son Shah Tahmasp, in retaliation for choosing to support his brother Bahram Mirza against him.

=== Tomb ===
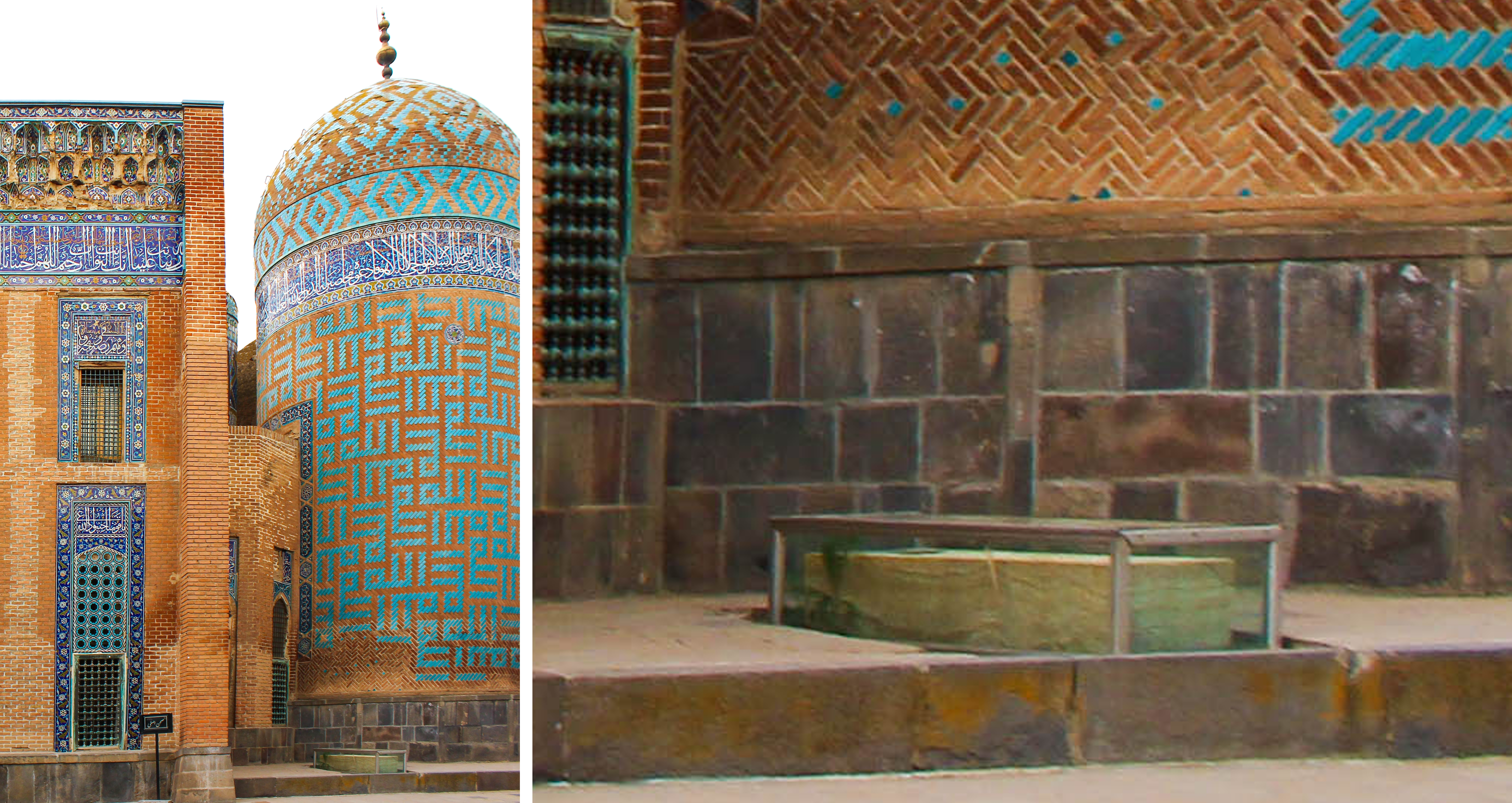
Tomb of Tajlu Khanum, at the foot of the dome tomb of Shaykh Safi, in Ardabil.

She was ultimately banished to Shiraz in 1540 because of treason by her son, Shah Tahmasp. She was buried at Ardabil close to her husband, where her tomb is marked at the feet of the tomb of Shayk Safi in the Sheikh Safi al-Din Khānegāh and Shrine Ensemble.

== Sources ==
- Bloom, Jonathan; Blair, Sheila (14 May 2009). Grove Encyclopedia of Islamic Art & Architecture: Three-Volume Set. Oxford University Press USA. ISBN 978-0-19-530991-1.
- Bosworth, C. E. (1984). "ĀL-E AFRĀSĪĀB". Encyclopaedia Iranica, Vol. I, Fasc. 7. London u.a.: Routledge & Kegan Paul. pp. 742–743. Archived from the original on 2014-02-20.
- Lal, Ruby (22 September 2005). Domesticity and Power in the Early Mughal World. Cambridge University Press. ISBN 978-0-521-85022-3.
- Parodi, Laura E. (2018). "Shah Abul-Maali, Mir Sayyid ali, and the Sayyids of Tirmiz: Three Portraits Challenge Akbari Historiography". Muqarnas. 35: 140, note 4. ISSN 0732-2992.
- Roxburgh, David J. (2005). The Persian album, 1400-1600 : from dispersal to collection. New Haven : Yale University Press. p. 247. ISBN 978-0-300-10325-0.
- Savory, Roger (1998). "ESMĀʿĪL I ṢAFAWĪ". Encyclopaedia Iranica, Vol. VIII, Fasc. 6. pp. 628–636.
- Newman, Andrew J. (2008). Safavid Iran: Rebirth of a Persian Empire. I.B. Tauris. pp. 1–281. ISBN 9780857716613.
