= Pari Khan Khanum (1506–1540) =

Safavid princess (1506–1540)

- Born: 1506
- Died: 1540 (aged 33–34)
- Spouse: Khalilullah II (m. 1521; death 1532)
- Dynasty: Safavid
- Father: Ismail I
- Mother: Tajlu Khanum

Pari Khan Khanum (Persian: پریخان خانم; 1506–1540) was a daughter of Shah Ismail I of Iran (r. 1501–1524).

She was born to Tajlu Khanum and was the sister of Mahinbanu Sultan. Alongside her mother and sister, she participated actively in politics during the reign of her father. In 1521, at fifteen years old, Pari Khan Khanum married politically in order of her father. As part of alliance between the Safavids and Shirvanshahs, she married Khalilullah II. Following Khalilullah II's death in 1532, Pari Khan Khanum returned to Qazvin.

== Sources ==
- Newman, Andrew J. (2008). Safavid Iran: Rebirth of a Persian Empire. London: I.B. Tauris. pp. 1–281. ISBN 9781845118303.
- Membré, Michele (1993). Mission to the Lord Sophy of Persia (1539–1542). Translated by A. H. Morton. London: School of Oriental and African Studies, University of London. ISBN 9780728602199.
- ibn Qubad, Khurshah. Tarikh-e Ilchi (in Persian).
