= Princess Sultanum =

Daughter of Ismail I of Persia

Mahinbanu Sultan
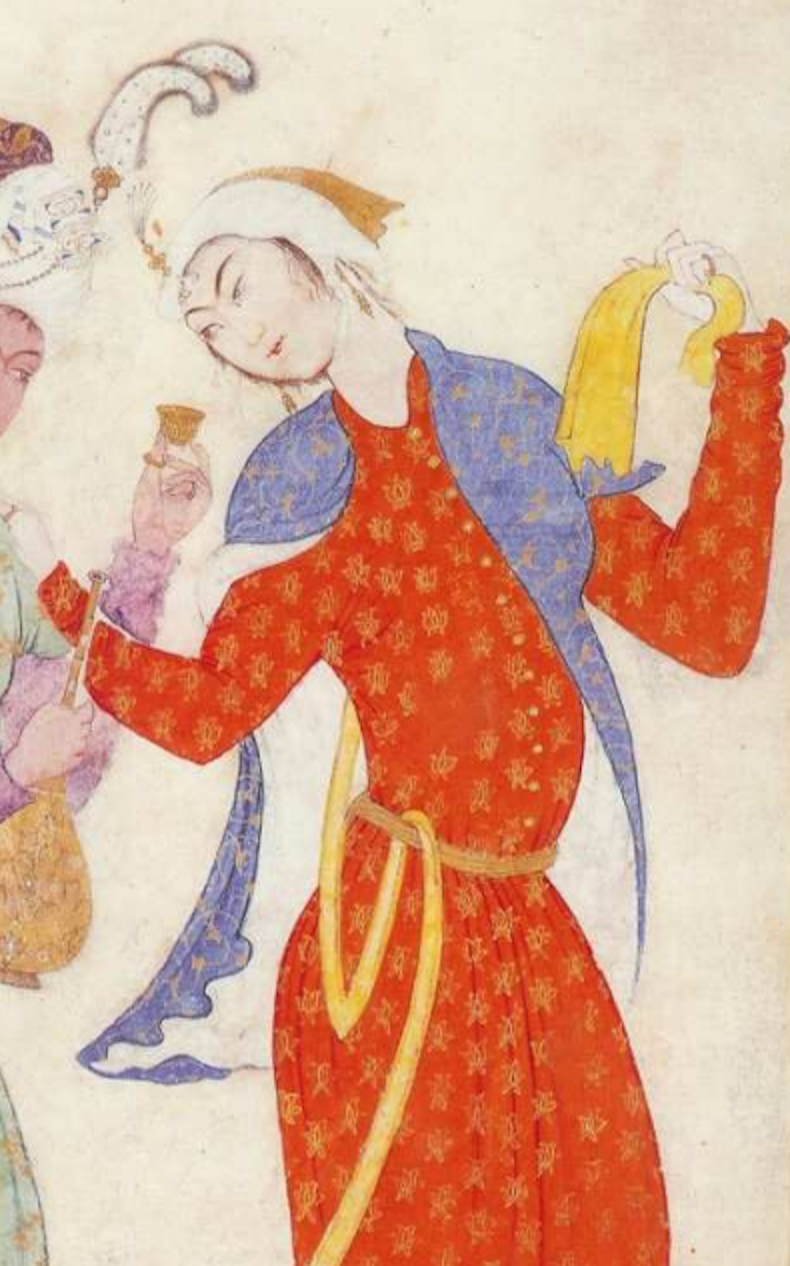
- Likely depiction of Princess Sultanum, in The Princely Lovers, attributable to Mirza Ali, Qazvin, circa 1544.
- Born: 1519; Tabriz, Safavid Iran
- Died: 1562 (aged 42–43); Qazvin, Safavid Iran
- Dynasty: Safavid
- Father: Ismail I
- Mother: Tajlu Khanum
- Religion: Shia Islam

Mahinbanu Khanum (Persian: مهین‌بانو خانم; 1519–1562), better known as Princess Sultanum, was a Safavid princess of Iran, and the daughter of Shah Ismail I (r. 1501–1524) and Tajlu Khanum. She was the youngest sister of Tahmasp I. She had a big influence on the reign of her brother, and acted as his political adviser. She was one of the prominent and highly influential figures of the Safavid era.

== Biography ==
Mahinbanu was born in 1519 in Tabriz. She lost her father at the age of five and received higher education at the royal court. She learned Persian and the Qur’an from Tajik teachers, and also studied the art of manuscript copying and painting under the great calligrapher Dust Muhammad Haravi. She was one of the patrons of Persian literature and religious works. She was very interested in politics which her mother, Tajlu Khanum, ensured she had an education in. After her mother's death in 1540, Mahinbanu was chosen as the only advisor to her brother, Shah Tahmasp. During her brother's reign, Mahinbanu was known as the greatest lady of the Safavid Empire. She never married and dedicated her whole life to the governments of her father and brother.

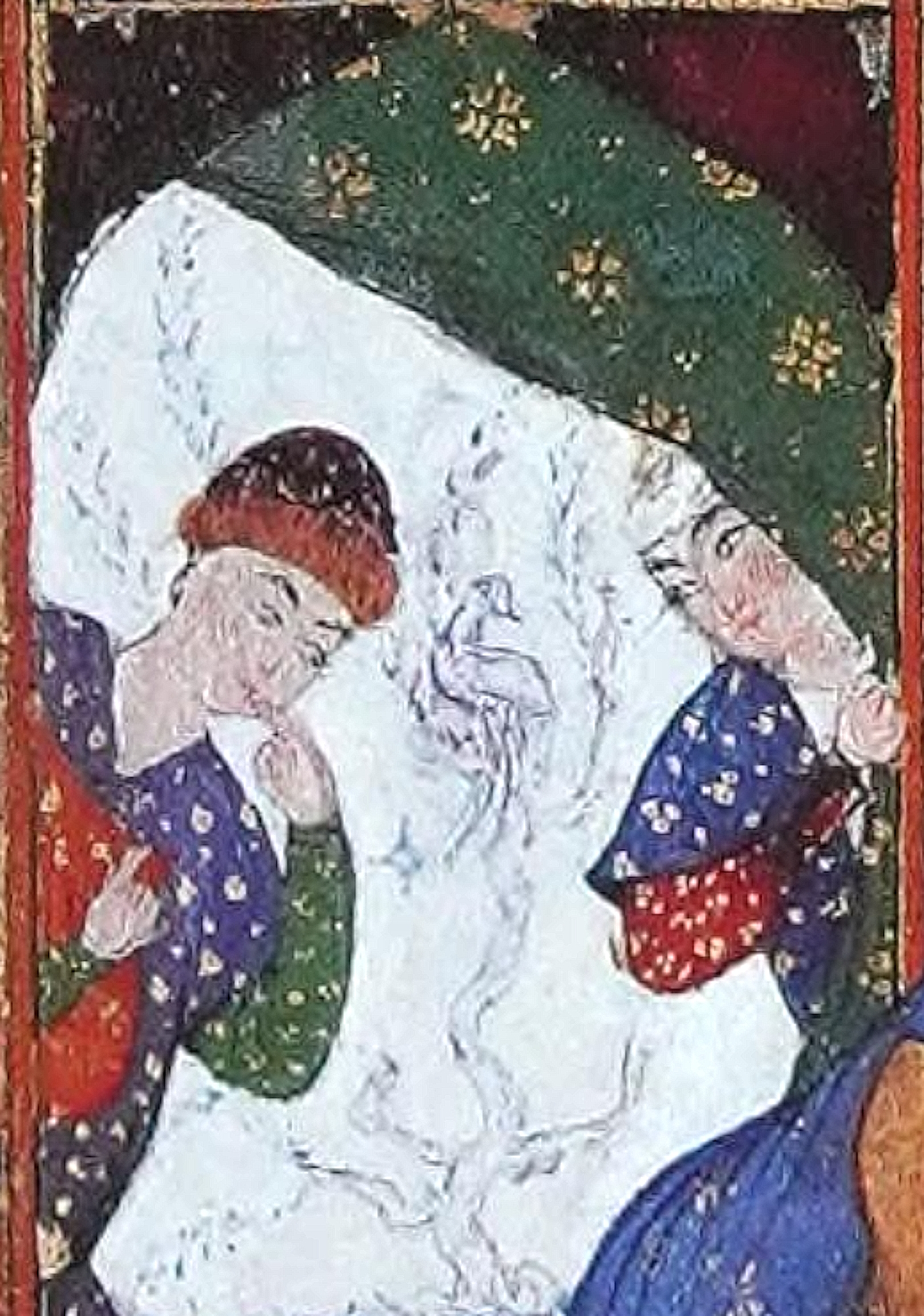
Possible depiction of Bahram Mirza and Princess Sultanum. 1531 painting.

After the death of her older brother, Bahram Mirza, she took care of his three children, Sultan Hossein Mirza, Ibrahim Mirza, and Badi-al Zaman Mirza Safavi. Mahinbanu took charge and brought them up, then at her request, the two younger sons of Bahram Mirza married the two eldest daughters of Shah Tahmasp. After that, she was given the title of "Sultana". In 1562, Mahinbanu Sultan died in Qazvin at the age of 43. According to her will, she was buried in her father's tomb in Ardabil.

=== Policy ===
She had a great interest in politics and her mother, Tajlu Khanum, introduced her to it thoroughly. After her mother’s death in 1540, Mahin Banu was chosen as the sole advisor to her brother, Shah Tahmasp. During her brother’s reign, Mahin Banu became known as the most prominent lady of the Safavid Empire. She never married and devoted her entire life to the service of her father and brother’s governments. It is also said that she established a garden in Qazvin, which was named Mahin Banu Garden after her. This garden was part of the royal residential district founded by Shah Tahmasp.

It is reported that on 8 Muharram 943 AH, Shah Tahmasp was informed that Amir Moʿaz al-Din Mohammad Sadr Esfahani intended to forge a marital alliance with the Alawi Safavid family and sought to marry the princess, Mahin Banu. Upon hearing this, Shah Tahmasp became extremely angry, so much so that he dismissed Amir Moʿaz al-Din from his position and turned his wrath on Mulla Rukn al-Din Hakim Kazerooni, one of the most learned physicians of the time who had delivered the news, ordering that he be executed by burning. She was influential in the political and social affairs of her time. As the Shah’s sister and one of the popular and powerful figures at court, she played a significant role in many political and social matters. Princess Mahin Banu was considered a close advisor to her brother. Shah Tahmasp would not undertake any state or financial affairs without consulting her.

He held her in great affection and valued her guidance. Some kings would write petitions to her, while others sought her intercession. During hunting trips, she would accompany Shah Tahmasp on horseback. During the conflict between Shah Tahmasp and his brother Bahram Mirza, the severity of Bahram Mirza’s punishment was reduced thanks to the mediation of Princess Mahin Banu. Mahin Banu Khanum Dari Vaziri was married to one of the sons of Amir Mohammad Yousuf Sadr-e-Tajik Tahmasp. Mahin Banu held such a prominent position that she was regarded as the "Queen of the Era" and the "Lady of the Time".

Mahinbanu Sultan was in politics for 22 years, from the time of her mother's death until her own death. She corresponded with Hurrem Sultan and, after Hurrem's death, these correspondences continued with Hurrem's daughter Mihrimah Sultan. Mutual gifts were exchanged as part of these correspondences, the most famous of which is the Iranian carpet that was given to Hurrem Sultan. She also corresponded with Hamida Banu Begum, the queen of the Gurkanian court.

=== Charitable works ===
Princess Mahin Banu was a wealthy woman. She donated much of her personal wealth to various individuals and charitable institutions.

Mahin Banu Khanum was recognized as an educated and prominent woman. She became well known for her support of shrines and sacred sites, as well as for charitable foundations established from the revenues of her estates in Shirvan, Tabriz, Qazvin, Ray, and Isfahan. She also endowed a waqf to assist women, which facilitated the marriages of young orphaned girls.

== International intrigue ==
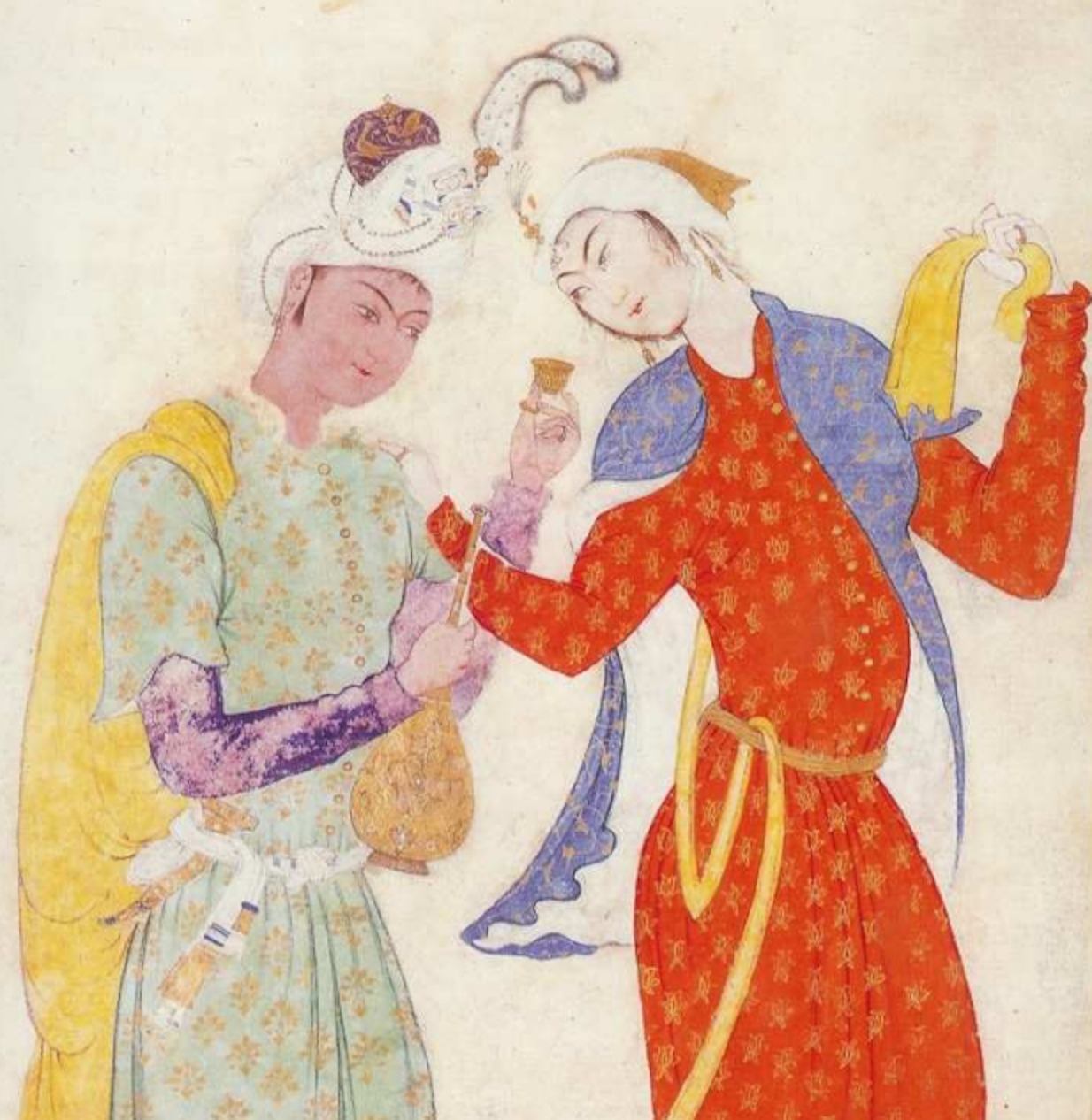
The Princely Lovers, a likely depiction of an affair between Bahram Beyg and Princess Soltanum.

Princess Soltanum was present at the Safavid court in Qazvin when an embassy from India visited, led by the deposed ruler Humayun, who had been ousted by the Afghan ruler Sher Shah Suri and betrayed by his brother Kamran Mirza. One of the members of the retinue was Bairam Khan, who may have had an affair with the celibate Mahinbanu Sultan. A 1544 painting by Mirza Ali named The Princely Lovers seems to depict an amorous relation between the two. The male figure in the painting has a dark complexion, a convention used to depict people from India, with thick sideburns cut straight at the bottom in the Indian fashion, and wears an Indian turban with a central bonnet (rather than the traditional Persian Taj-e Haydari) along with a yellow shawl. He was himself a Shia, being of Qara Qoyunlu ancestry.

At one point in the negotiations led by Bairam Beyg, Shah Tahmasp demanded that Bairam Beyg wear the Persian headdress, the taj-e Haydari as a sign of submission. Bairam Beyg refused, saying he needed the permission of his ruler. Shah Tahmasp, in anger, had several heretics executed as a veiled threat to Bairam Beyg. Humeyun later agreed to put on the Persian headdress, which he said he was accepting as "a crown of honor". But when Humayun refused to convert to Shiism, Shah Tahmasp ordered for Humayun and his retinue to be murdered. Mahinbanu Sultan famously intervened, in tears, imploring her brother Shah Tahmasp not to pursue the order. This lends further credence to a possible amorous relationship between Mahinbanu Sultan and Bairam Beyg.

Humayun finally made an implicit acceptance of the Shia faith, Bairam Beyg was given the title of "Khan" by Shah Tahmasp, and was sent as an ambassador to Kamran Mirza in Kabul.

== Arts ==
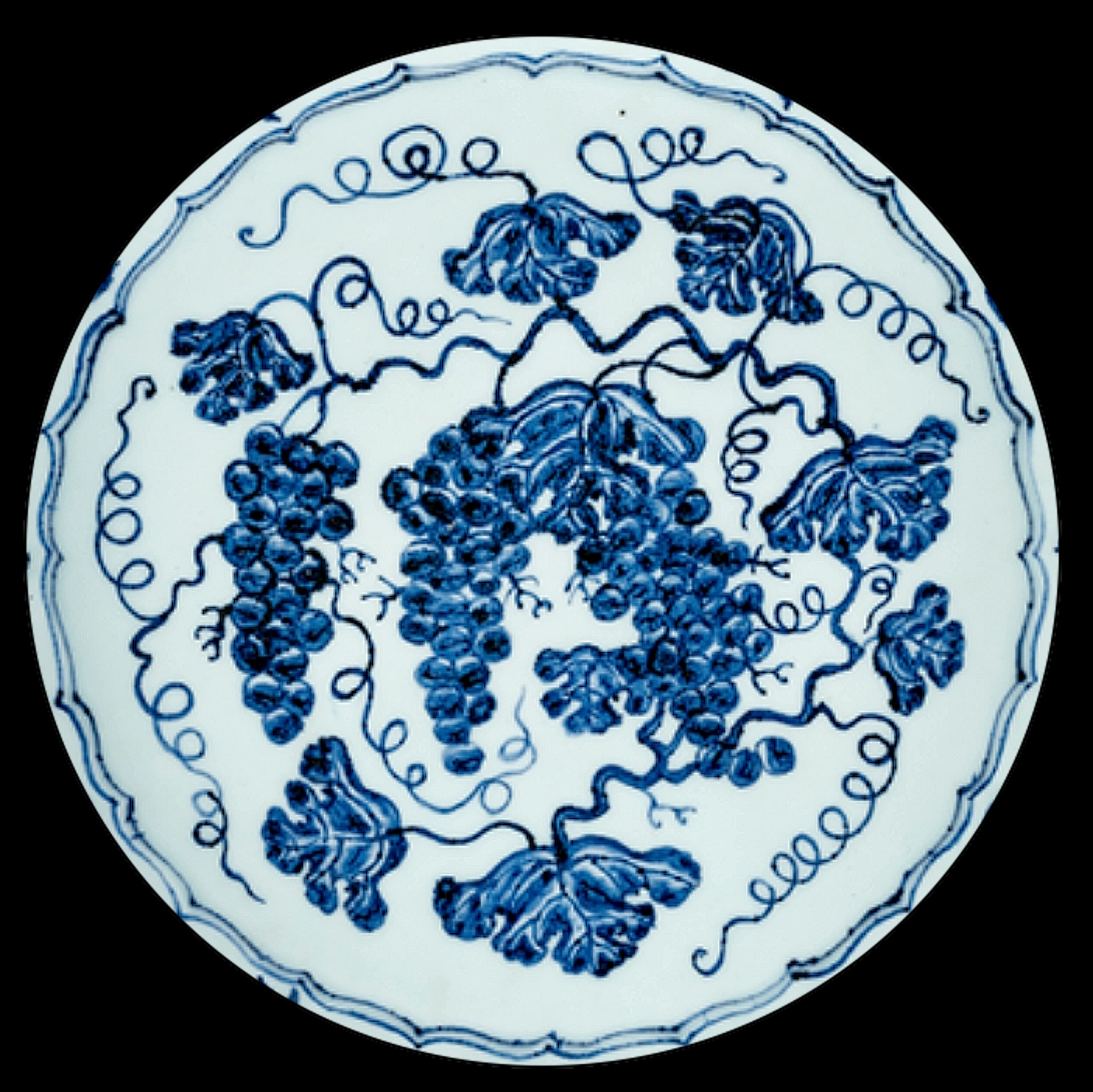
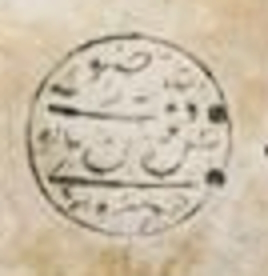
The Mahinbanu dish (central medallion). China; Ming Dynasty, Yongle Period, 1403–25. Endowment engraving on the back, by Princess Soltanum (1519–1562). It reads waqf-e...razavi 'abduhu mahin banu safavi.

Mahinbanu Khanum had a renowned collection of Chinese porcelain, which she donated to the Imam Riza Shrine at Mashhad in 1561. One of the porcelains is the Mani Banu dish, now in the Al Thani Collection. It is a Ming dynasty, Yongle period (1403–25) blue and white porcelain dish manufactured in Jingdezhen, and it bears an endowment engraving on the back, by Princess Soltanum (1519–1562). It reads waqf-e...razavi 'abduhu mahin banu safavi ("This is an endowment dedicated to the Razavi shrine, made by its humble servant, Lady Mahin Banu Safavi.").

Mani Banu learned calligraphy from Dust Muhammad, and some of her elegant poems appear in the Bahram Mirza Album.

She dedicated her jewelry to Imam Zaman and Imam Reza.

== Sources ==
- Hani Khafipour. The Foundations of Safavid State: fealty, patronage, and ideals of authority (1501-1576). — Chicago, Illinois: The University of Chicago, 2013. — P. 254.
- Yusuf Ünal. "Princesses, Patronage and the Production of Knowledge in Safavid Iran." Female religious authority in Shi'i Islam (2021): 220-250.
