= Mirza Ali =

16th century Persian painter

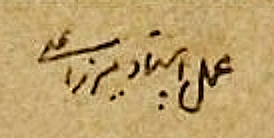
- Signature of Mirza Ali, 1543
- Notable work: Illustration of the Hamzanama; Khamseh of Nizami
- Patrons: Shah Tahmasp

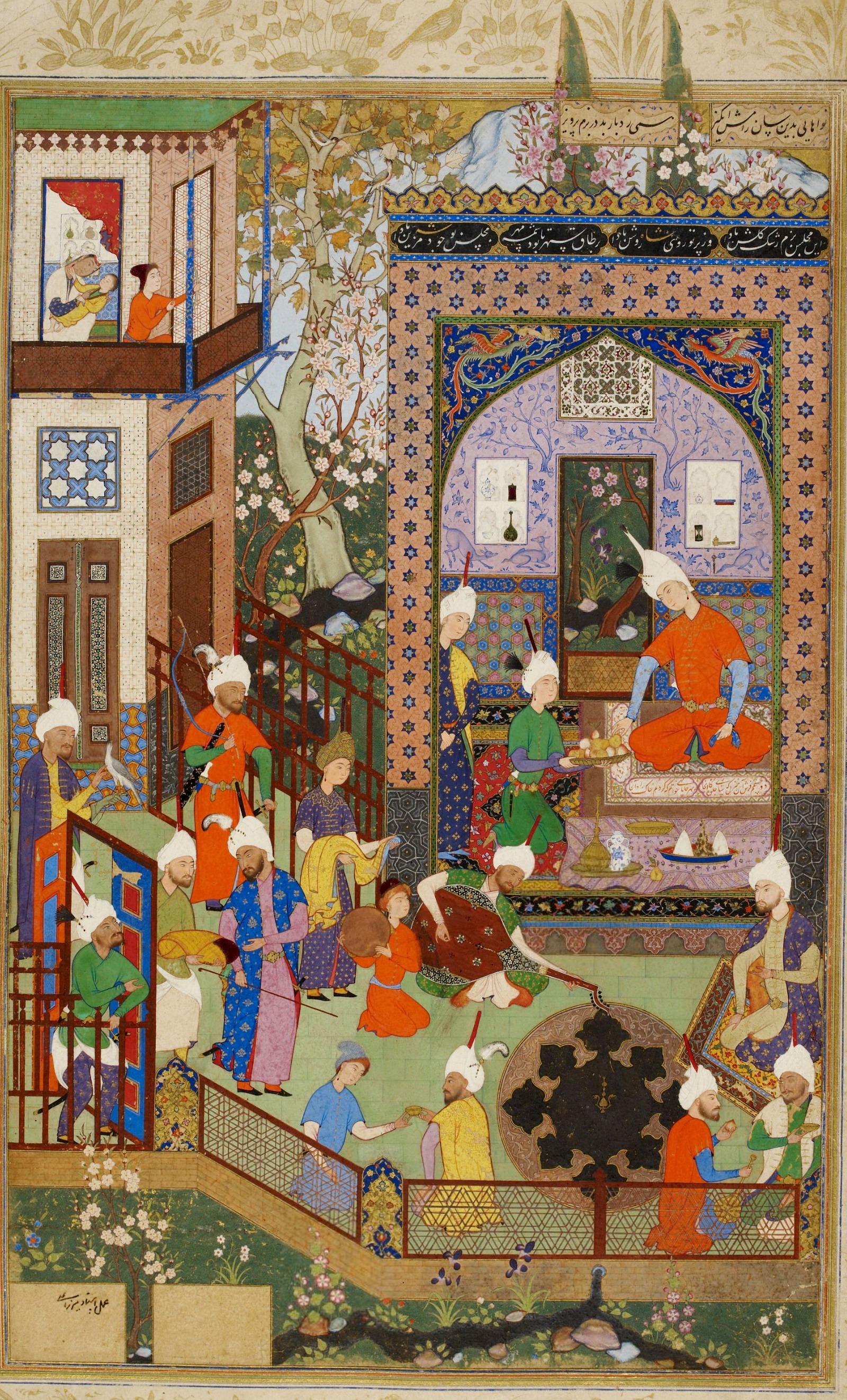
The Sasanian emperor Khosrow II listening to Barbad playing the lute, Made by Mirza Ali as part of the Khamsa of Nizami in 1539–43 at Tabriz. Stored in the British Library.

Mirza Ali (Persian: میرزا علی; c. 1509–1575) was a painter of Persian miniatures in the 16th and 17th centuries. He was the son of the prominent painter Sultan Mohammed (fl. 16th-century). Born in Tabriz, he was raised at the city's scriptorium, which belonged to the Safavid shah (king) Tahmasp I (r. 1524–1576).

According to the contemporary Safavid historian Budaq Monshi Qazvini, Mirza Ali "left for India after his father's death and prospered there". Persian and Mughal art specialist Barbara Brend also suggests that Mirza Ali traveled to India in order to work in the Mughal court, even though she does not quote the source for this claim. Martin Bernard Dickson and Stuart Cary Welch suggest that Mirza Ali's career continued in Iran until around 1575, while Abolala Soudavar suggests that Mirza Ali accompanied Humayun to India and returned to Iran after the latters death in 1556.

Brend considers Mirza Ali and Abd al-Samad to have been the same person, due to their stylistic similarities.

== Sources ==
- Canby, Sheila R. (2020). "Mīrzā ʿAlī". In Fleet, Kate; Krämer, Gudrun; Matringe, Denis; Nawas, John; Rowson, Everett (eds.). Encyclopaedia of Islam (3rd ed.). Brill Online. ISSN 1873-9830.
