= Giovanni Maria Angiolello =

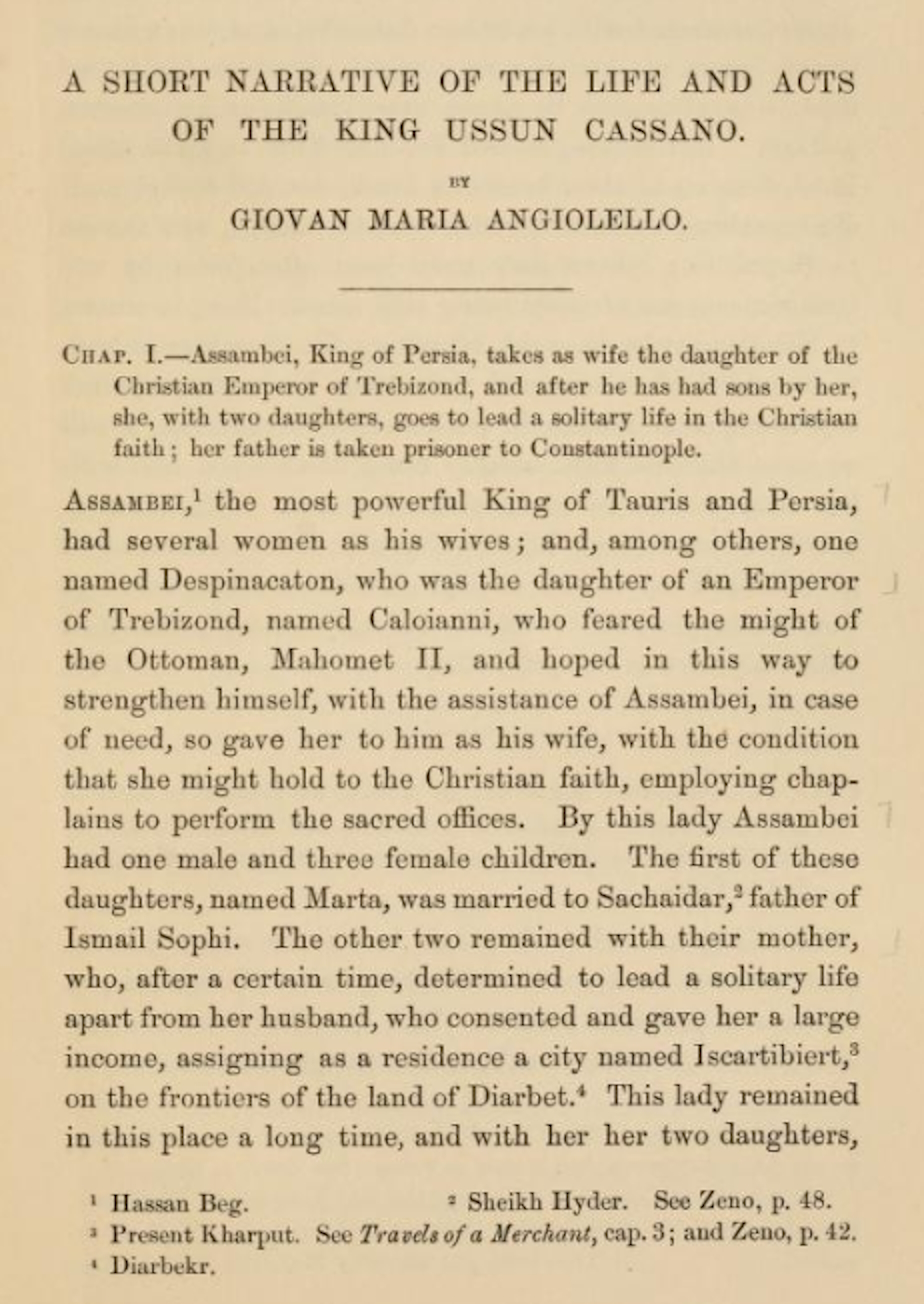
- Front page of Angiolello's account (1873 translation).
- Born: 1451 or 1452; Vicenza (Italy)
- Died: Around 1525
- Citizenship: Republic of Venice
- Occupations: Traveller, author
- Notable work: Turkish History

Giovanni Maria Angiolello was a Venetian traveller, author of an important historical report on the Aq Qoyunlu and early Safavid Persia.

== Life ==
Born around 1451 or 1452 in Vicenza, under the rule of Venice since 1404, Angiolello left Venice in 1468, took part in the defense of Negroponte, besieged by the Ottoman emperor Mehmed II. Enslaved by the Turks, he was taken to Constantinople where he first served the heir apparent, Prince Mustafa, and then the Grand Seraglio. He was with the Ottoman armies in Persia, in the Balkan Peninsula and Asia (1472–1481).

After about 1483 Angiolello's career is uncertain. He came back to his home town Vicenza, married and became a functionary.

He possibly had two missions (perhaps for the Venetian Republic) or stayed (as an agent or merchant) in Persia around 1482 (after Sultan Mehmed's death) and then in between 1499 and 1515. He died around 1525.

In addition to a report on his first trip, it is almost certainly the author (Note: An attempt to attribute the work to the noble Venetian Donato da Sezze did not find consensus) of a Turkish History (Historia Turchesca), valuable source for the history of the sultanates of Mehmed II and Bayezid II. He left some notices about Gentile Bellini's works in Istanbul.

== Works ==
- Grey, Charles; Angiolelli, Giovanni Maria degli; Alessandri, Vincentio d' (1873). A narrative of Italian travels in Persia, in the fifteenth and sixteen centuries. London, Printed for the Hakluyt society.

== Sources ==
- Meserve, Margaret (2006), "News from Negroponte: politics, popular opinion, and information exchange in the first decade of the Italian press", Renaissance Quarterly, 59 (2): 440–480, doi:10.1353/ren.2008.0312, archived from the original on 2013-05-09
- Benjamin Lellouch; Nicolas Michel (19 September 2012). Conquête ottomane de l'Égypte (1517): Arrière-plan, impact, échos. BRILL. pp. 110–. ISBN 978-90-04-23208-2.<
