= Tahmasp I =

Shah of Iran from 1524 to 1576

Tahmasp I تهماسب یکم
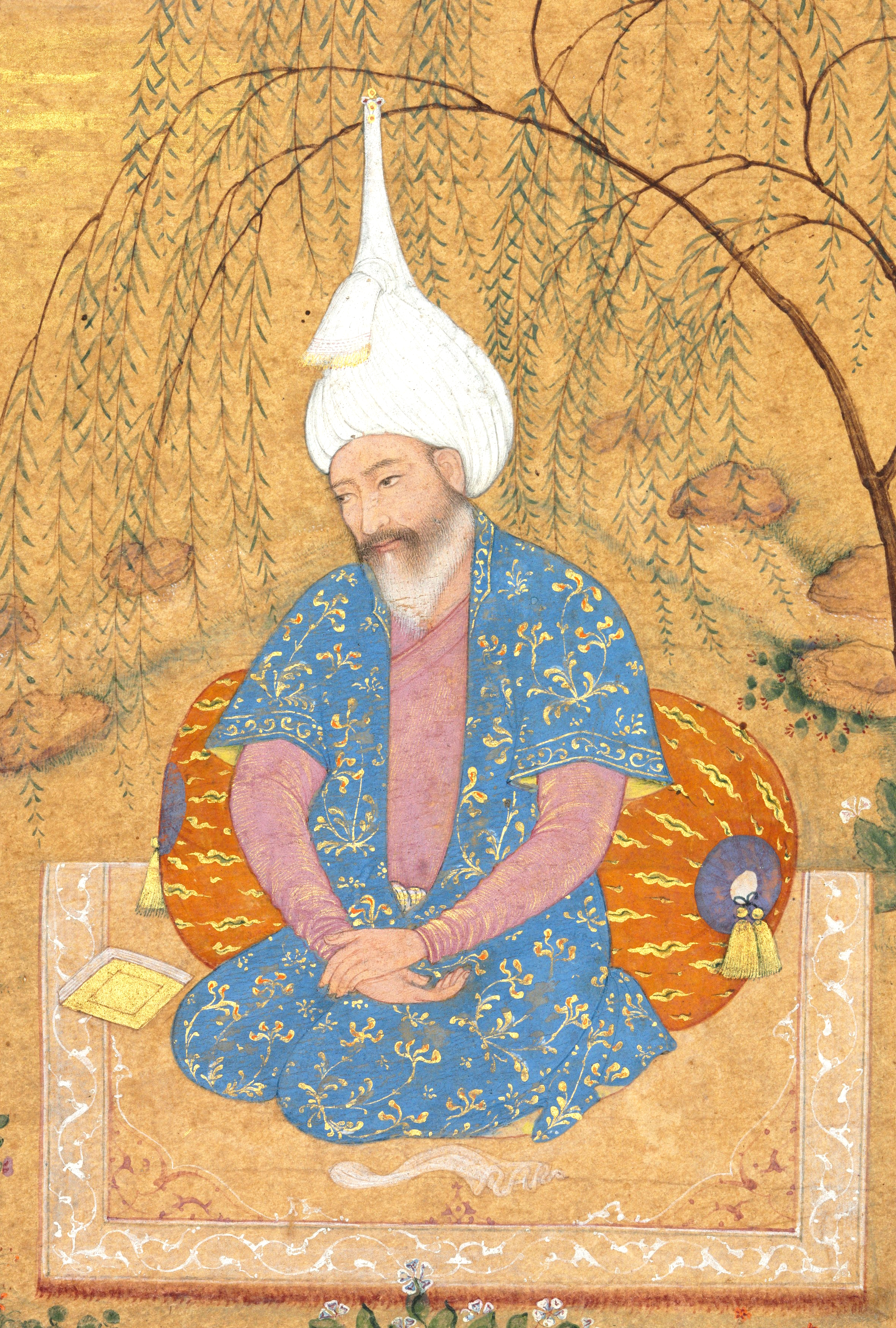
- Shah Tahmasp I near the end of his life, circa 1575.

Shah of Iran
- Reign: 23 May 1524 – 25 May 1576
- Coronation: 2 June 1524
- Predecessor: Ismail I
- Successor: Ismail II
- Regent: See list: Div Sultan Rumlu; Kopek Sultan; Chuha Sultan; Hossein Khan
- Born: 22 February 1514; Shahabad, Safavid Iran
- Died: 25 May 1576 (aged 62); Qazvin, Safavid Iran
- Spouse: Many, among them: Sultanum Begum; Sultan-Agha Khanum
- Issue Among others: Mohammad Khodabanda; Ismail II
Names
- Abu'l-Fath Tahmasp (Persian: ابوالفتح تهماسب)
- Dynasty: Safavid
- Father: Ismail I
- Mother: Tajlu Khanum
- Religion: Twelver Shia Islam
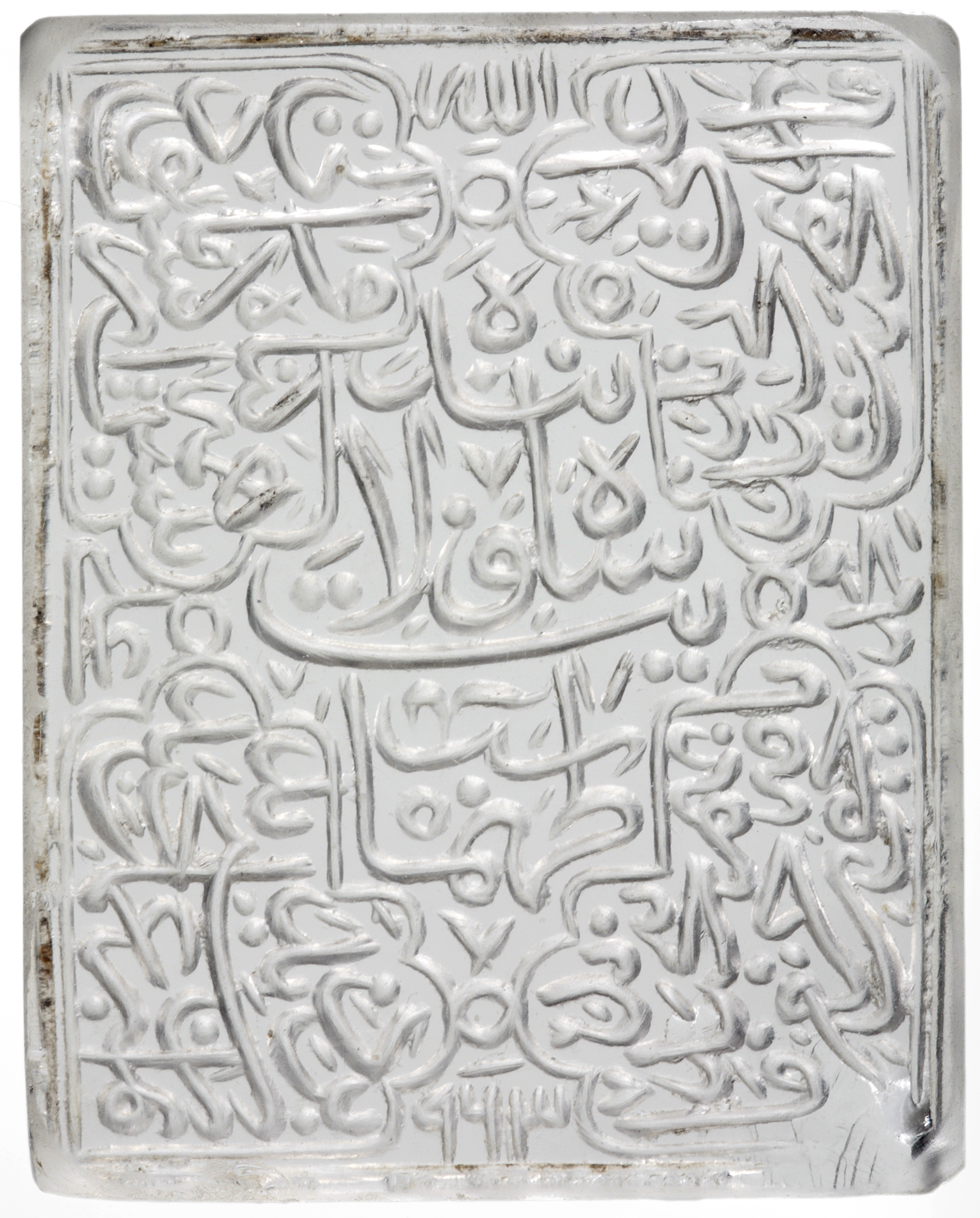
- Seal

Tahmasp I (Persian: طهماسب یکم, romanized: Ṭahmāsb or تهماسب یکم Tahmâsb; 22 February 1514 – 14 May 1576) was the second shah of Safavid Iran from 1524 until his death in 1576. He was the eldest son of Shah Ismail I and his principal consort, the Mawsillu princess Tajlu Khanum.

Tahmasp ascended the throne after the death of his father on 23 May 1524. The first years of Tahmasp's reign were marked by civil wars between the Qizilbash leaders until 1532, when he asserted his authority and began an absolute monarchy. He soon faced a long-lasting war with the Ottoman Empire, which was divided into three phases. The Ottoman sultan, Suleiman the Magnificent, tried to install his own candidates on the Safavid throne. The war ended with the Peace of Amasya in 1555, with the Ottomans gaining sovereignty over Iraq, much of Kurdistan, and western Georgia. Tahmasp also had conflicts with the Uzbeks of Bukhara over Khorasan, with them repeatedly raiding Herat. In 1528, at the age of fourteen, he defeated the Uzbeks in the Battle of Jam by using artillery.

Tahmasp was a patron of the arts and was an accomplished painter himself. He built a royal house of arts for painters, calligraphers and poets. Later in his reign, he came to despise poets, shunning many and exiling them to the Mughal court of India. Tahmasp is known for his religious piety and fervent zealotry for the Shia branch of Islam. He bestowed many privileges on the clergy and allowed them to participate in legal and administrative matters. In 1544 he demanded that the fugitive Mughal emperor Humayun convert to Shi'ism in return for military assistance to reclaim his throne in India. Nevertheless, Tahmasp still negotiated alliances with the Christian powers of the Republic of Venice and the Habsburg monarchy who were also rivals of the Ottoman Empire.

Tahmasp's succession was disputed even before his death; after his death a civil war erupted, causing the deaths of most of the royal family. His reign, spanning nearly fifty-two years, was the longest of any Safavid ruler. While contemporary Western accounts were critical of him, modern historians recognize Tahmasp as a courageous and capable commander who preserved and expanded his father's empire. His reign marked a pivotal shift in Safavid ideological policy: he ended the Turkoman Qizilbash tribes' veneration of his father as the Messiah and instead established himself as a pious and orthodox Shia king. Tahmasp also initiated a long-term process, later continued by his successors, to diminish Qizilbash influence in Safavid politics. This was achieved by introducing a "third force" composed of Islamized Georgians and Armenians.

== Name ==
"Tahmasp" (Persian: طهماسب, romanized: Ṭahmāsb) is a New Persian name, ultimately derived from Old Iranian *ta(x)ma-aspa, meaning "having valiant horses." The name is one of the few instances of a name from the epic poem Shahnameh (The Book of Kings) being used by an Islamic-era dynasty based in Iran. In the Shahnameh, Tahmasp is the father of Zaav, the penultimate shah of the mythical Persian Pishdadian dynasty.

== Background ==
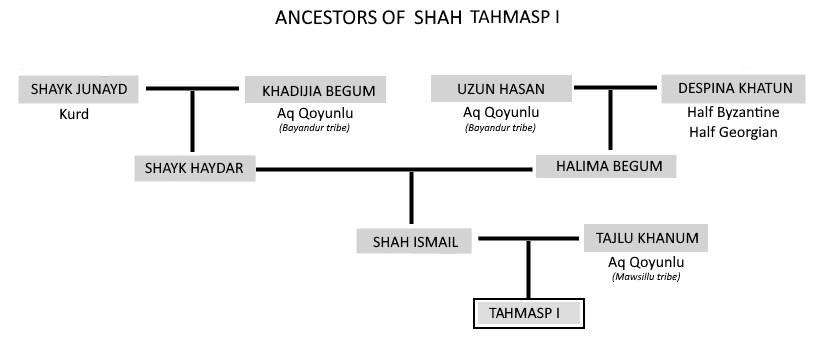
Family tree of Shah Tahmasp.

Tahmasp was the second shah of the Safavid dynasty, a family of Kurdish origin, who were sheikhs of a Sufi tariqa (school of Sufism) known as the Safavid order and centred in Ardabil, a city in the northwestern Iran. The first sheikh of the order and eponym of the dynasty, Safi-ad-din Ardabili (d. 1334), married the daughter of Zahed Gilani (d. 1301) and became the master of his father-in-law's order, the Zahediyeh. Two of Safi-ad-Din's descendants, Shaykh Junayd (d. 1460) and his son, Shaykh Haydar (d. 1488), made the order more militant and unsuccessfully tried to expand their domain.

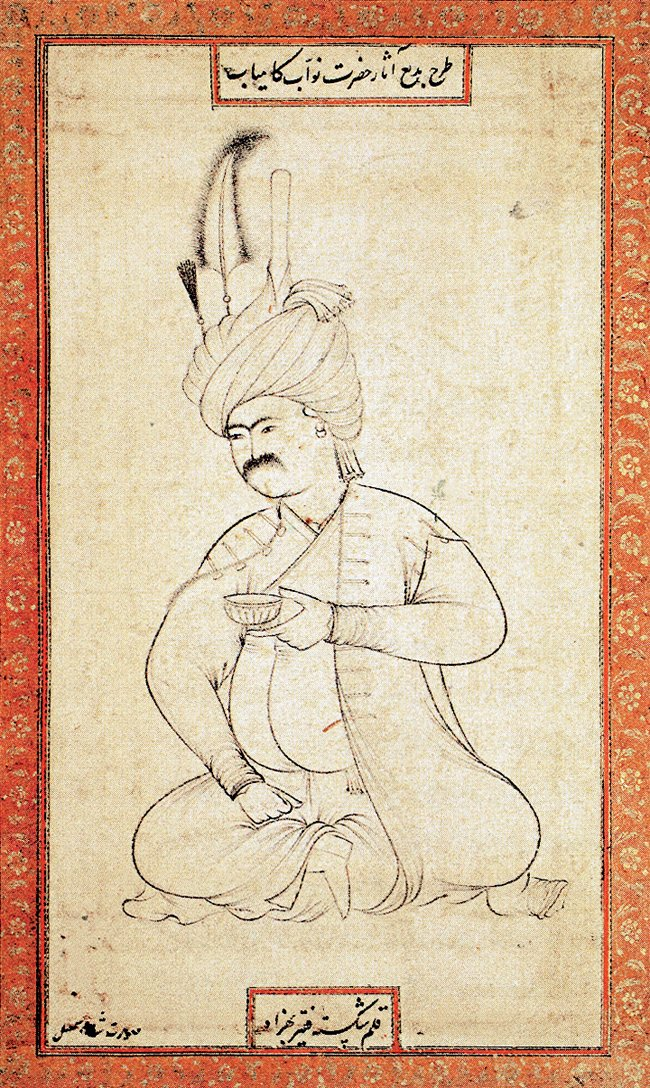
Shah Ismail I, father of Shah Tahmasp, in the style of Kamal al-din Behzad. Topkapı Palace Museum, H. 2169.

Tahmasp's father, Ismail I (r. 1501–1524), who inherited the leadership the Safavid order from his brother, Ali Mirza, became shah of Iran in 1501, a state mired in civil war after the collapse of the Timurid Empire. He conquered the territories of the Aq Qoyunlu tribal confederation, the lands of the Chinggisid (Descendant of Genghis Khan) Uzbek Shaybanid dynasty in the eastern Iran, and many city-states by 1512. Ismail's realm included the whole territory of modern Iran, in addition to sovereignty over Georgia, Armenia, Daghestan, and Shirvan in the west, and Herat in the east. Unlike his Sufist ancestors, Ismail believed in Twelver Shia Islam and made it the official religion of the realm. He forced conversion on the Sunni population by abolishing Sunni Sufi orders, seizing their property, and giving the Sunni ulama (Islamic clergymen) a choice of conversion, death, or exile. From this, a power vacuum emerged which allowed the Shia ulama to create a clerical aristocracy filled with seyyid (descendant of Muhammad) and mujtahid (Islamic scholar expert in the Islamic law) landowners.

Ismail established the Qizilbash Turkoman tribes as inseparable members of the Safavid administration since they were the "men of the sword" who brought him to power. These "men of the sword" clashed with the other major part of his bureaucracy, the "men of the pen", who controlled the literati and were mainly Persian. Ismail created the title of vakil-e nafs-e nafs-e homayoun (deputy to the king) to resolve the dispute. The title of vakil surpassed both the amir al-umara (commander-in-chief; mostly bestowed upon Qizilbash leaders), and the grand vizier (minister and head of the bureaucracy) in authority. The holder of the title was the vicegerent of Ismail and represented him in the royal court. The creation of this new superior title could not cease the clashes between the Qizilbash leaders and Persian bureaucrats, which eventually climaxed in the Battle of Ghazdewan between the Safavids and the Uzbeks, in which Ismail's vakil, the Persian Najm-e Sani, commended the army. The Uzbek victory, during which Najm was captured and executed afterwards, was the result of the desertion of many of the Qizilbash.

The Uzbeks of Bukhara were a recurring problem on the Iranian eastern borders. The Safavids and the Shaybanids rose to power almost simultaneously at the turn of the sixteenth century. By 1503, when Ismail I had taken possession of large parts of the Iranian plateau, Muhammad Shaybani, Khan of Bukhara (r. 1500–1510), had conquered Khwarazm and Khorasan. Ismail defeated and killed Muhammad Shaybani in the Battle of Marv in 1510, returning Khorasan to Iranian possession, though Khwarazm and the Persianate cities in Transoxiana remained in Uzbek hands. Thereafter the possession of Khorasan became the main bone of contention between Safavids and Shaybanids.

In 1514, Ismail's prestige and authority were damaged by his loss in the Battle of Chaldiran against the Ottoman Empire. Before the war with the Ottomans, Ismail promoted himself as a reincarnation of Ali or Husayn. This belief weakened after Chaldiran, and Ismail lost his theological-religious relationship with the disappointed Qizilbash tribes who had previously seen him as invincible. This affected Ismail, who began drinking heavily and never again led an army; this permitted the seizure of power by the Qizilbash tribes which overshadowed Tahmasp's early reign.

== Early life ==
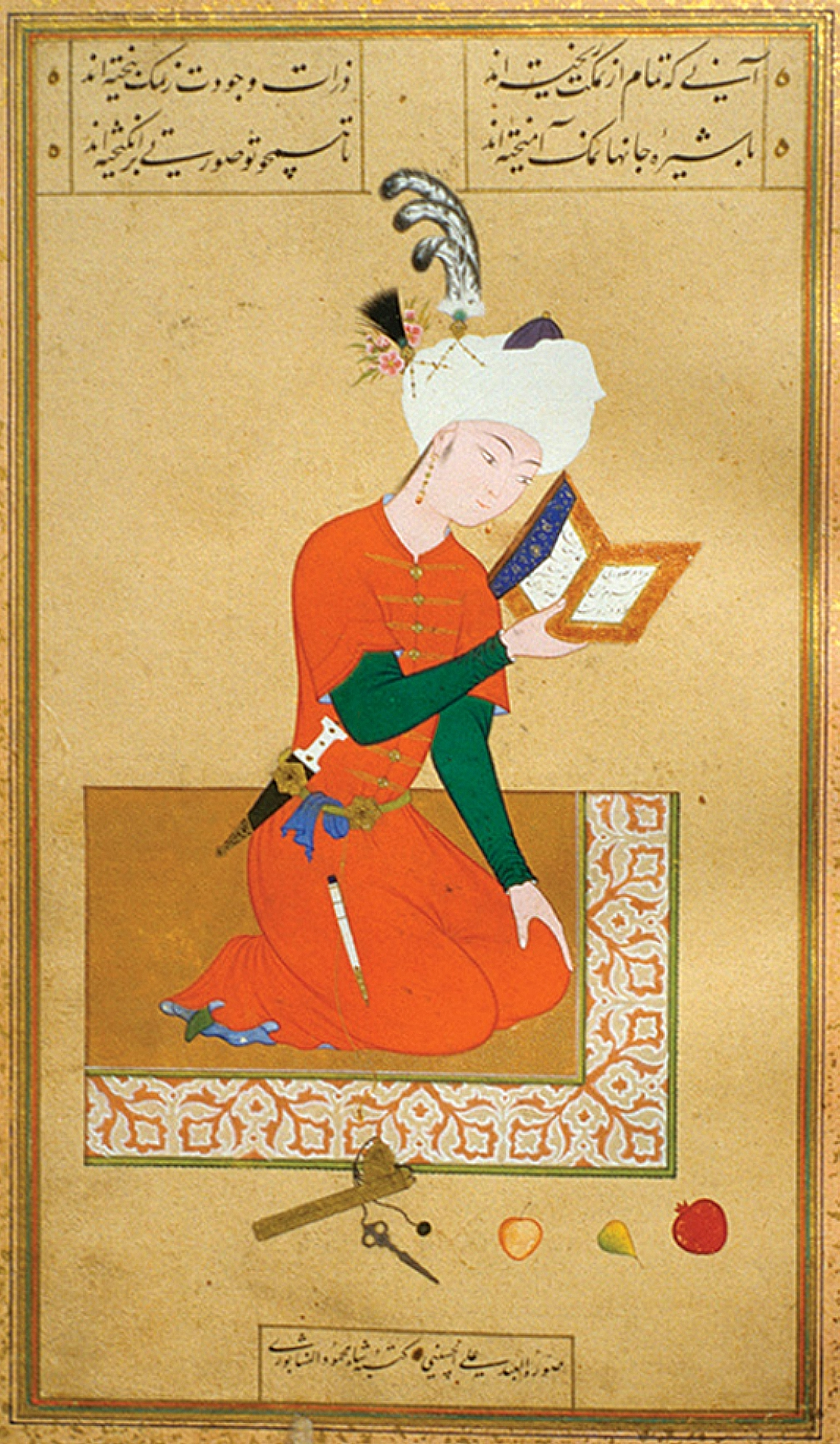
Likely contemporary painting of Tahmasp reading a poem. Painted before 1549, Bahram Mirza Album. (Note: "Pl. XVIa. Tahmasb reading a poem, fol. 2a of MS. R. 957, Topkapi Saray Museum, Istanbul" in Soudavar 2017, pp. 66ff, plaque XVIa, XVIb)

Abu'l-Fath Tahmasp Mirza (Note: In the Safavid society, when the term Mirza (the equivalent of Prince) was used after a name, e.g. Tahmasp Mirza, it was referring to a prince, while if it was used before a name, like Mirza Ebrahim, Mirza Taqi, it meant that the man belonged to the bureaucratic class and the literati.) was born on 22 February 1514 in Shahabad, a village near Isfahan, as the eldest son of Ismail I and his principal consort, princess Tajlu Khanum from the Mawsillu tribe of the Aq Qoyunlu confederation. (Note: "Tajlu was a princess from the Mawsillu, one of the great tribes comprising the Aq-Qoyunlu confederation." in Ze’evi 2024, p. 100) According to the narrative told by Iranian naqqals (coffeehouse storytellers), on the night of Tahmasp's birth, a storm erupted, with wind, rain, and lightning. Tajlu Khanum, feeling her labour pains beginning, suggested that the royal caravan camp in some village. The royal caravan thus headed to Shahabad. The kadkhoda (warden) of the village was a Sunni and did not let Tajlu Khanum enter his house, but a Shia resident of the village welcomed her into his modest house. By then, Tajlu Begum's pain had made her faint, and shortly after entering the house gave birth to a son. When the news reached Ismail, he was reportedly "heaped" with utmost joy and happiness, but refrained from seeing his son until his astrologers gave him an auspicious date to do so. When the auspicious hour arrived, the young boy was presented to Ismail and astrologers foresaw his future to be one entwisted with war and peace and that he would have many sons. Ismail named the boy Tahmasp after Ali, the first Imam, told him to do so in his dream. From the same parents, Tahmasp later had a brother, Bahram Mirza Safavi, and two sisters, Pari Khan Khanum and Mahinbanu Soltanum, who all came to have important political and cultural roles.

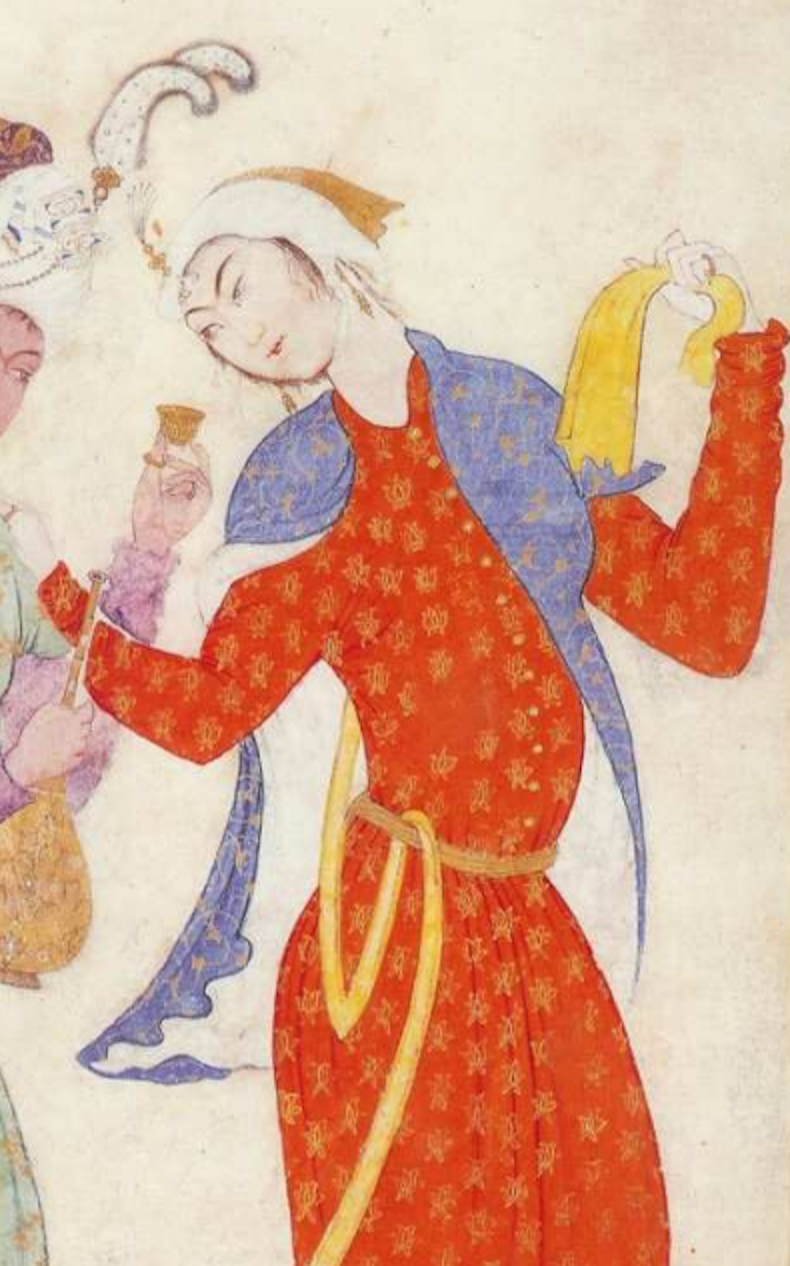
Likely depiction of Mahinbanu Soltanum, full sister of Shah Tahmasp. Qazvin, circa 1544.

In 1516, when Tahmasp Mirza was two years old, the province of Khorasan became his fief by Ismail's order. This appointment was specially done to emulate the Timurid dynasty, that followed the Turco-Mongol tradition of appointing the eldest son of a sovereign to govern a prominent province like Khorasan. The centre of this major province, the city of Herat, would go on to be the city where Safavid crown princes were raised, trained, and educated throughout the sixteenth century. In 1517, Ismail appointed the Diyarbakr governor Amir Soltan Mawsillu as Tahmasp's lala (tutor) and governor of Balkh, a city in Khorasan. He replaced the Shamlu and Mawsillu governors of Khorasan, who did not join his army during the Battle of Chaldiran for fear of famine. Placing Tahmasp in Herat was an attempt to reduce the growing influence of the Shamlu tribe, which dominated Safavid court politics and held a number of powerful governorships. Ismail also appointed Amir Ghiyath al-Din Mohammad, a prominent Herat figure, as Tahmasp's religious tutor.

A struggle for control of Herat emerged between the two tutors. Amir Soltan arrested Ghiyath al-Din and executed him the following day, but was ousted from his position in 1521 by a sudden raid by the Uzbeks who crossed the Amu Darya and seized portions of the city. Ismail appointed Div Sultan Rumlu as Tahmasp's lala, and the governorship was given to his younger son, Sam Mirza Safavi. During his years in Herat, Tahmasp developed a love for writing and painting. He became an accomplished painter and dedicated a work to his brother, Bahram Mirza. The painting was a humorous composition of a gathering of Safavid courtiers, featuring music, singing, and wine-drinking.

In the spring of 1524, Ismail became ill on a hunting trip to Georgia and recovered in Ardabil on his way back to the capital. But he soon developed a high fever which led to his death on 23 May 1524 in Tabriz.

== Regency ==
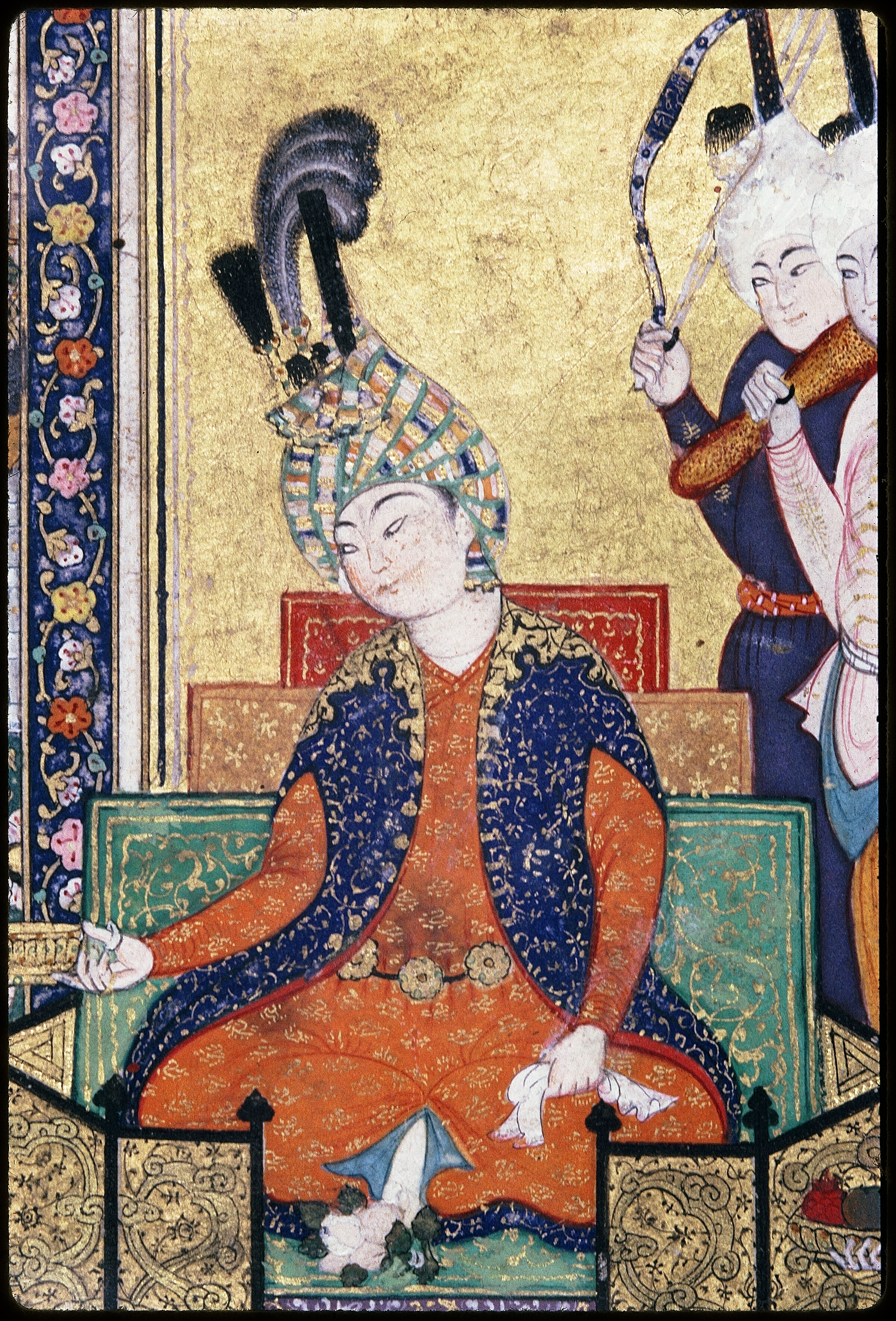
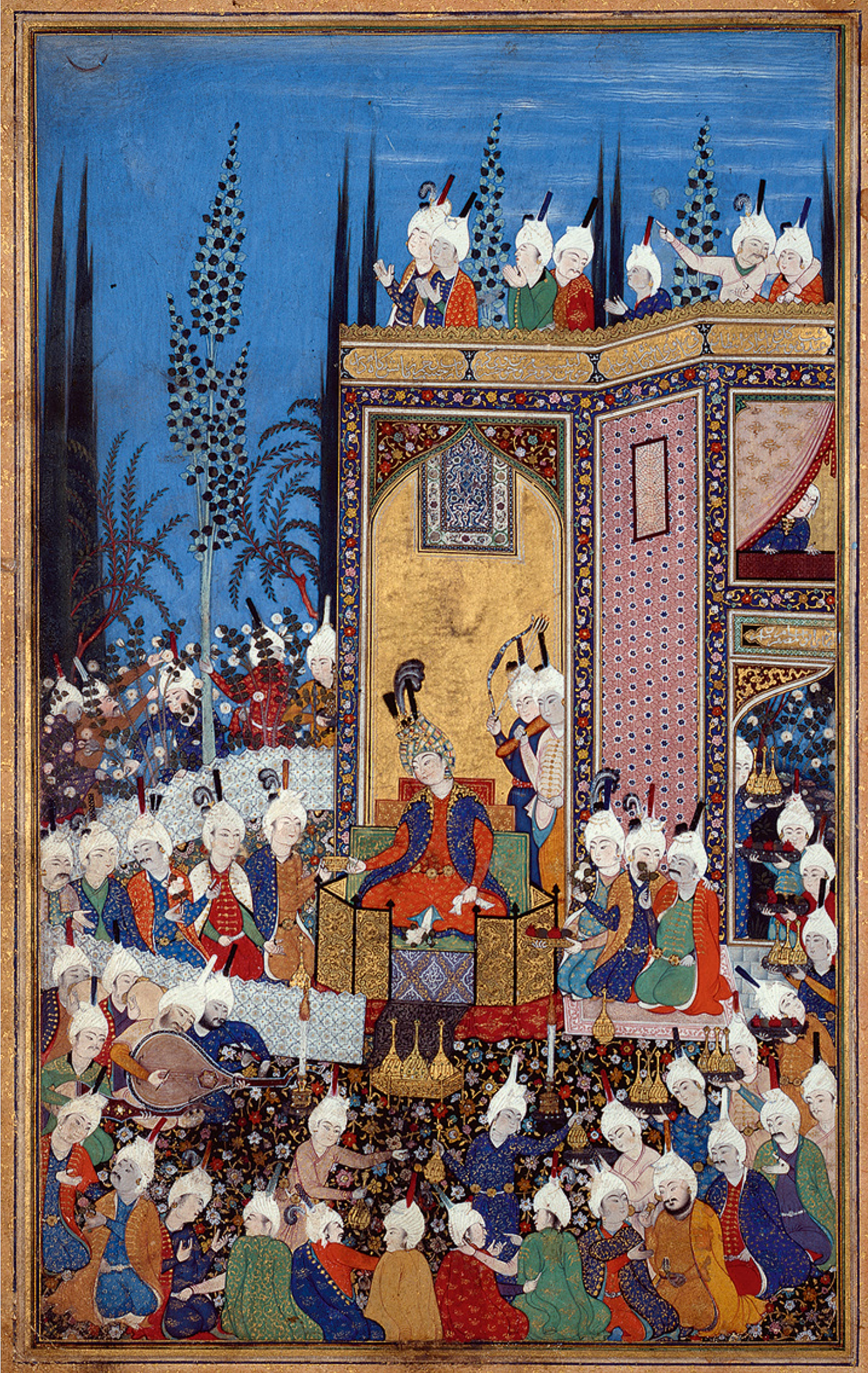
Contemporary portrait of Shah Tahmasp (around 17) at the Celebration of `Id. Painted by Sultan Mohammed in Tabriz, circa 1531. Cartier Hafiz.

The ten-year-old Tahmasp ascended the throne after his father's death under the guardianship of Div Sultan Rumlu, his lala, the de facto ruler of the realm. Rule by a member of the Rumlu tribe was unacceptable to the other Turkoman tribes of the Qizilbash, especially the Ostajlu and Takkalu. Kopek Sultan, governor of Tabriz and leader of Ostajlu, along with Chuha Sultan, leader of the Takkalu tribe, were Div Sultan Rumlu's strongest opponents. The Takkalu were powerful in Isfahan and Hamadan, and the Ostajlu held Khorasan and the Safavid capital, Tabriz. Rumlu proposed a triumvirate to the two leaders which was accepted, the terms were for sharing the office of amir al-umara. The triumvirate proved unsustainable, since all sides were dissatisfied with their share of power. In the spring of 1526, a series of battles in northwest Iran between these tribes expanded into Khorasan and became a civil war. The Ostajlu faction was quickly excluded and their leader, Kopek Sultan, was killed by order of Chuha Sultan. During the civil war, the Uzbeks raiders temporarily seized Tus and Astarabad. Div Sultan Rumlu was blamed for the raids and was executed. His execution was performed by Tahmasp himself.

At the behest of the young king, Chuha Sultan, the sole remaining member of the triumvirate, became de facto ruler of the realm from 1527 to 1530. Chuha tried to remove Herat from Shamlu dominance, which led to a conflict between the two tribes. In early 1530, the Herat governor, Hossein Khan Shamlu, and his men killed Chuha and executed every Takkalu in the retinue of the shah in the royal camp. This provoked the Takkalu tribe to rebellion, and a few days later, in an act of retaliation, they attacked the shah's retinue in Hamadan. One of the tribesman attempted to abduct the young Tahmasp, who had him put to death. Then Tahmasp ordered the general slaughter of the Takkalu tribe; many were killed, and many fled to Baghdad, where the governor, himself a Takkalu, put some to death to prove his loyalty. Eventually, the remaining Takkalu managed to flee to the Ottoman Empire. In the contemporary chronicles, the downfall of Chuha Sultan and the massacre of his tribe is dubbed "the Takkalu pestilence". Hossein Khan Shamlu thereafter assumed Chuha Sultan's position with the consent of the Qizilbash leaders.

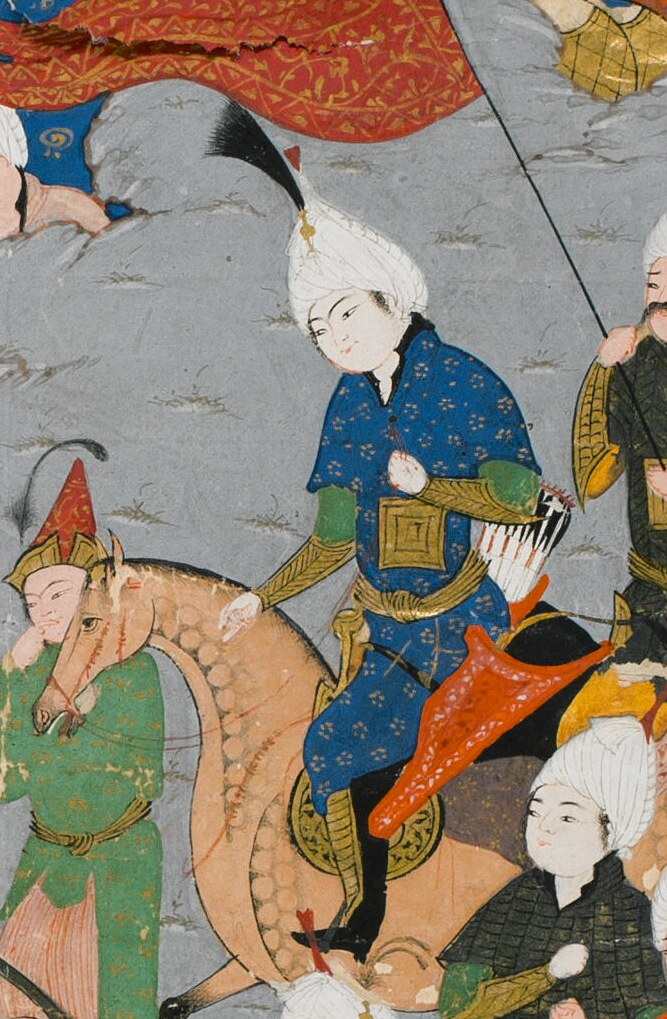
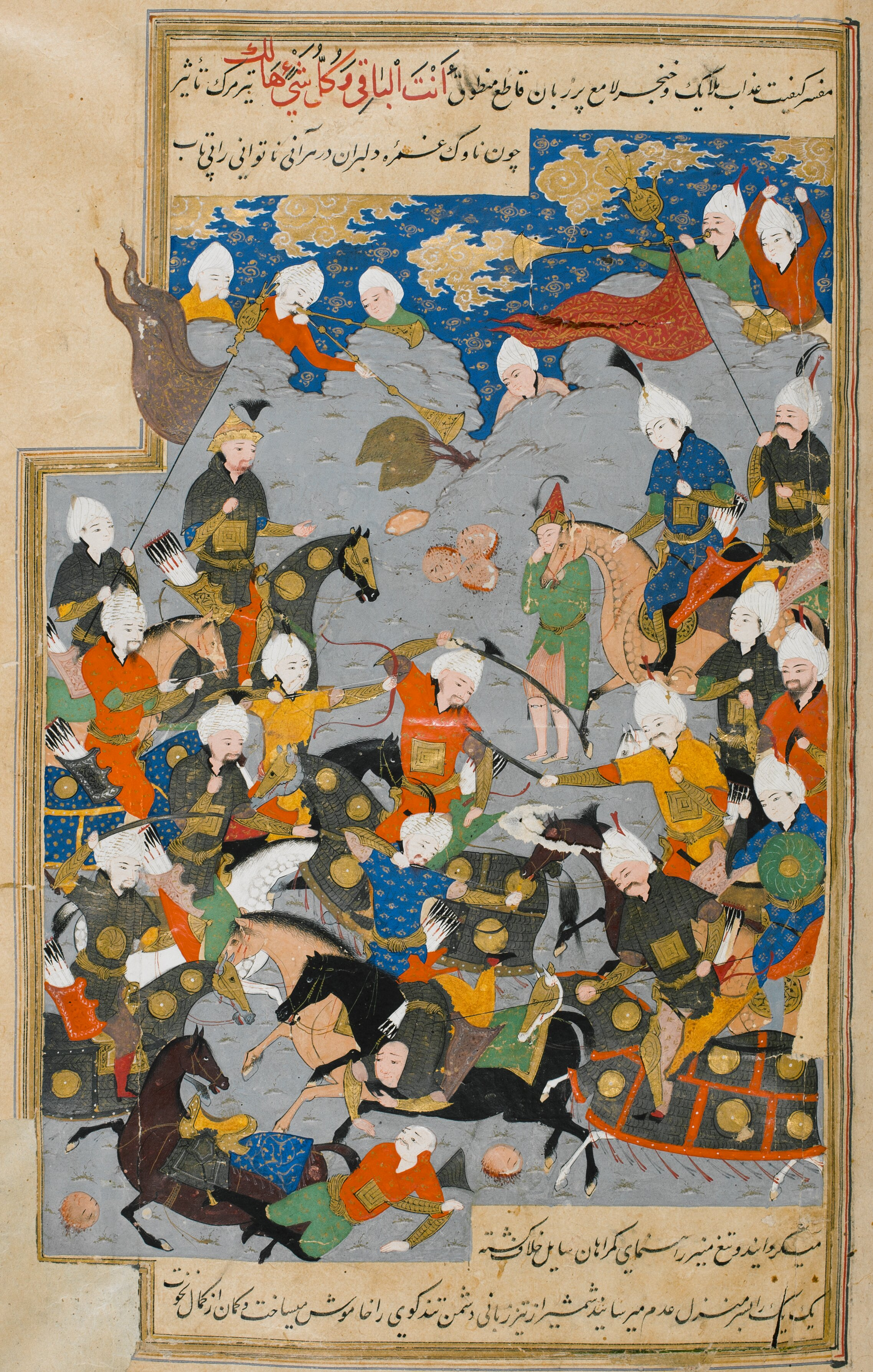
Shah Tahmasp I on horse, at the Battle between Tahmasp I and Ubayd Allah Khan on 24 September 1524. Kholāsat al-tavārikh by Ahmad Monshi Ghomi (painted in 1595)

While the civil war was ongoing among the Qizilbash, the Uzbeks under Ubayd Allah Khan conquered the borderlands. In 1528, Ubayd reconquered Astarabad and Tus and besieged Herat. Fourteen-year-old Tahmasp commanded the army and defeated the Uzbeks, distinguishing himself at the Battle of Jam. Safavid superiority in the battle was due to many different factors, one of them being their use of artillery, which they had learned from the Ottomans. The then governor of Herat and Tahmasp's regent, Hossein Khan Shamlu, distinguished himself during the battle and earned the respect of the shah. The victory, however, reduced neither the Uzbek threat nor the realm's internal chaos, since Tahmasp had to return to the west to suppress a rebellion in Baghdad. That year, the Uzbeks captured Herat; however, they allowed Sam Mirza to return to Tabriz. Their occupation did not last long, and Tahmasp drove them out in the summer of 1530. He appointed his brother, Bahram Mirza, governor of Khorasan and Ghazi Khan Takkalu, as Bahram's tutor.

By this point, Tahmasp had turned seventeen, and thus no longer needed a regent. Hossein Khan Shamlu circumvented this challenge by having himself named as the steward to Tahmasp's newborn son, Mohammad Mirza. Hossein Khan constantly undermined the shah's power and had angered Tahmasp many times. His confidence in his power, combined with the rumours that Hossein Khan intended to depose Tahmasp and place his brother, Sam Mirza, on the throne, finally led Tahmasp to rid himself of the powerful Shamlu amir. Thus Hossein Khan was overthrown and executed in 1533. His fall was a turning point for Tahmasp, who now knew that each Turkoman leader would favour his tribe. He reduced the influence of the Qizilbash and gave the "men of the pen" bureaucracy greater power, ending the regency.

== Reign ==
=== Ottoman war ===
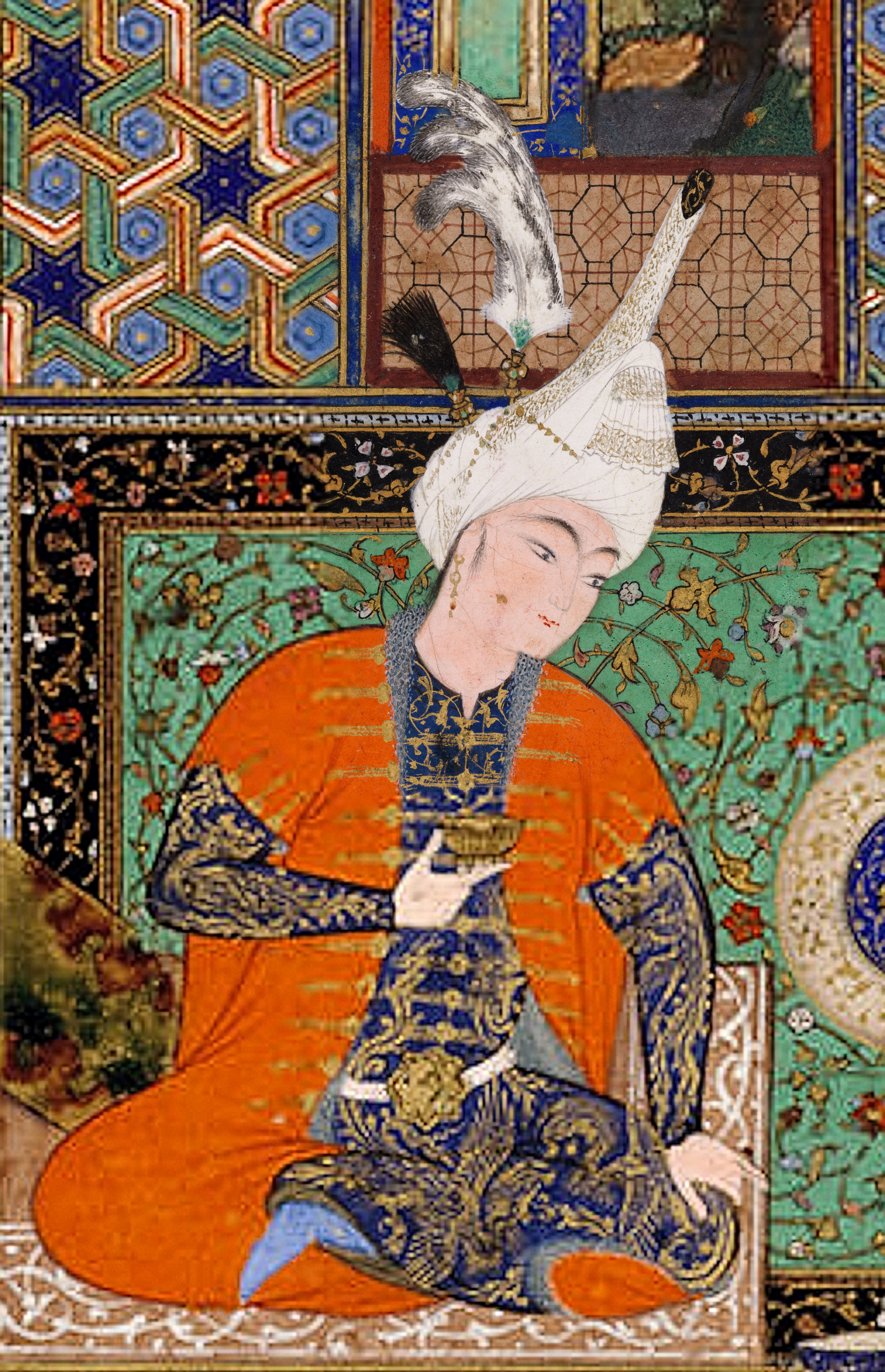
Shah Tahmasp I at his court in Tabriz, around 26 years old. Nighttime in a City, by Mir Sayyid Ali, c. 1540 (Sackler Museum, 1958.76).

Suleiman the Magnificent (r. 1520–1566), sultan of the Ottoman Empire, may have considered a strong Safavid empire a threat to his ambitious plans in the west and northwest of his realm. During the first decade of Tahmasp's reign, however, he was preoccupied with fighting the Habsburgs and the unsuccessful attempt to seize Vienna. In 1532, while the Ottomans were fighting in Hungary, Suleiman sent Olama Beg Takkalu with 50,000 troops under Fil Pasha to Iran. Olama Beg was one of many Takkalu members who, after Chuha's death, took refuge in the Ottoman Empire. The Ottomans seized Tabriz and Kurdistan, and tried to obtain support from Gilan province. Tahmasp drove the Ottomans out, but news of another Uzbek invasion prevented him from defeating them. Suleiman sent his grand vizier, Ibrahim Pasha, to occupy Tabriz in July 1534 and joined him two months later. Suleiman peacefully conquered Baghdad and Shia cities such as Najaf. Whilst the Ottomans were on the march, Tahmasp was in Balkh, campaigning against the Uzbeks.

The first Ottoman invasion caused the greatest crisis of Tahmasp's reign. Its events however are difficult to reconstruct; on an unknown date, an agent from the Shamlu tribe unsuccessfully tried to poison Tahmasp; they revolted against the shah, who had recently asserted his authority by removing Hossein Khan. Seeking to dethrone Tahmasp, they chose one of his younger brothers, Sam Mirza (who had a Shamlu guardian) as their candidate. The rebels then contacted Suleiman and asked him for support in enthroning Sam Mirza, who promised to follow a pro-Ottoman policy. Suleiman recognised him as ruler of Iran, which panicked Tahmasp's court. Tahmasp reconquered the seized territory when Suleiman went to Mesopotamia, and Suleiman led another campaign against him. Tahmasp attacked his rearguard, and Suleiman was forced to retreat to Constantinople at the end of 1535 after losing all his gains except Baghdad. After confronting the Ottomans, Tahmasp rushed to Khorasan to defeat his brother. Sam Mirza surrendered and sought mercy from Tahmasp. The shah accepted his brother's pleads and banished him to Qazvin but otherwise executed many of his advisors, namely, his Shamlu guardian.

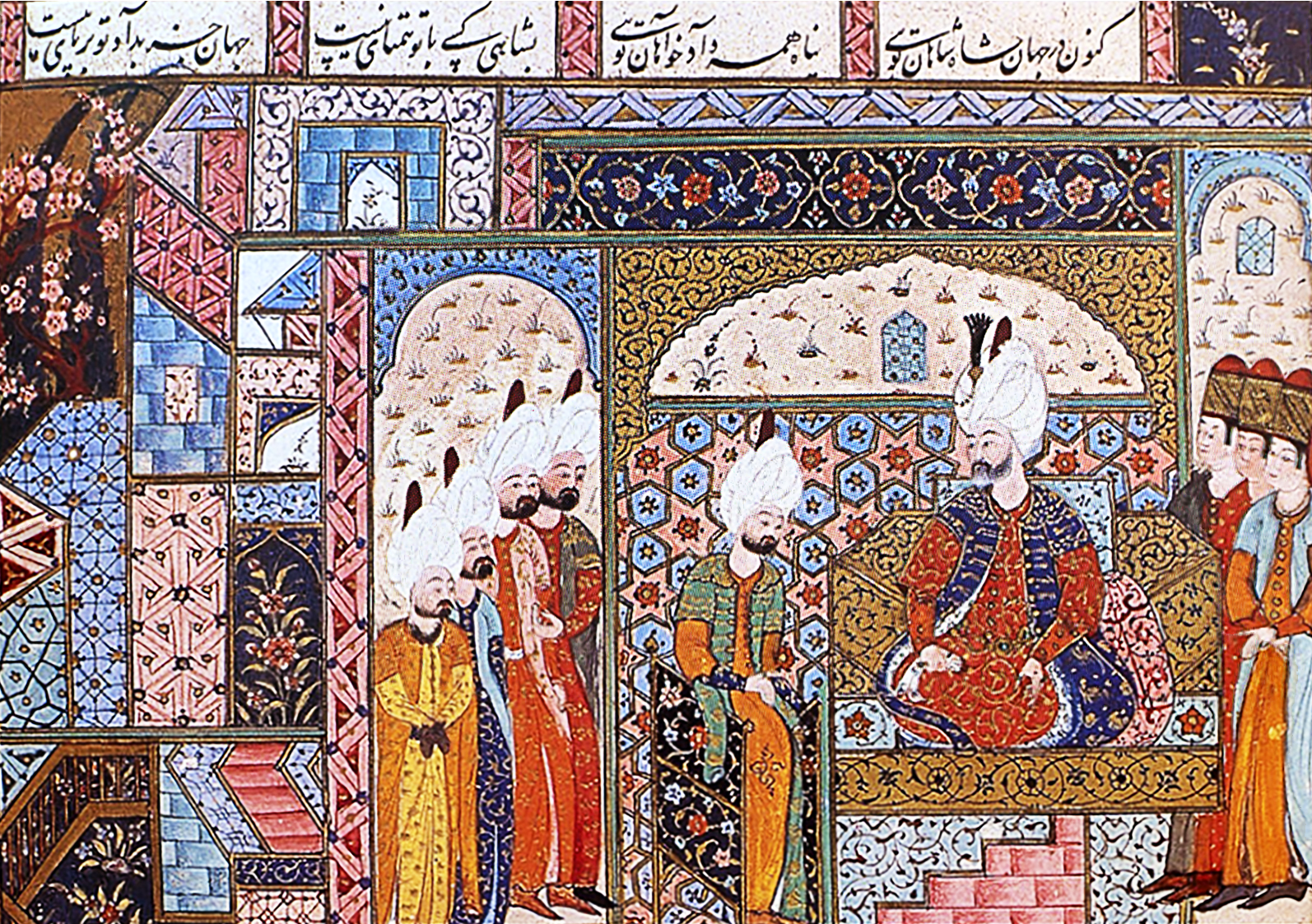
Alqas Mirza and Suleiman the Magnificent. Illustration from the Süleymanname (Ottoman, 1558).

Relations with the Ottomans remained hostile until the revolt of Alqas Mirza, another one of Tahmasp's younger brothers, who had led the Safavid army during the 1534–35 Ottoman invasion and was governor of Shirvan. He led an unsuccessful revolt against Tahmasp, who conquered Derbant in the spring of 1547 and appointed his son Ismail as governor. Alqas fled to Crimea with his remaining forces and took refuge with Suleiman. He promised to restore Sunni Islam in Iran and encouraged the Sultan to lead another campaign against Tahmasp. The new invasion sought the quick capture of Tabriz in July 1548; it soon became clear, however, that Alqas Mirza's claims of support from all the Qizilbash leaders were untrue. The long campaign focused on looting, plundering Hamadan, Qom, and Kashan before being stopped at Isfahan. Tahmasp did not fight the exhausted Ottoman army but laid waste the entire region from Tabriz to the frontier; the Ottomans could not permanently occupy the captured lands, since they soon ran out of supplies.

Eventually, Alqas Mirza was captured on the battlefield and imprisoned in a fortress, where he died. Suleiman ended his campaign, and by the fall of 1549 the remaining Ottoman forces retreated. The Ottoman sultan launched his last campaign against the Safavids in May 1554, when Ismail Mirza (Tahmasp's son) invaded eastern Anatolia and defeated Erzerum governor Iskandar Pasha. Suleiman marched from Diyarbakr towards Armenian Karabakh and reconquered the lost lands. Tahmasp divided his army into four corps and sent each in a different direction, indicating a Safavid army that had grown much larger than it was in the previous wars. With Tahmasp's Safavids holding the advantage, Suleiman had to retreat. The Ottomans negotiated the Peace of Amasya, in which Tahmasp recognised Ottoman sovereignty in Mesopotamia and much of Kurdistan; furthermore, as an act of obeisance towards Sunni Islam and Sunnis, he banned the holding of Omar Koshan (a festival commemorating the assassination of the second caliph Umar ibn al-Khattab) and expressing hatred towards the Rashidun caliphs, who are held dear by the Sunni Muslims. The Ottomans allowed Iranian pilgrims to travel freely to Mecca, Medina, Karbala, and Najaf. Through this treaty, Iran had time to increase its forces and resources as its western provinces had the opportunity to recuperate from the war. This peace also demarcated the Ottoman-Safavid frontier in the north-west without the cession of large areas of territory on the Safavid side. These terms, in circumstances favourable to the Safavids, were evidence of the frustration felt by Suleiman the Magnificent at his inability to inflict a greater defeat on the Safavids.

=== Georgian campaigns ===
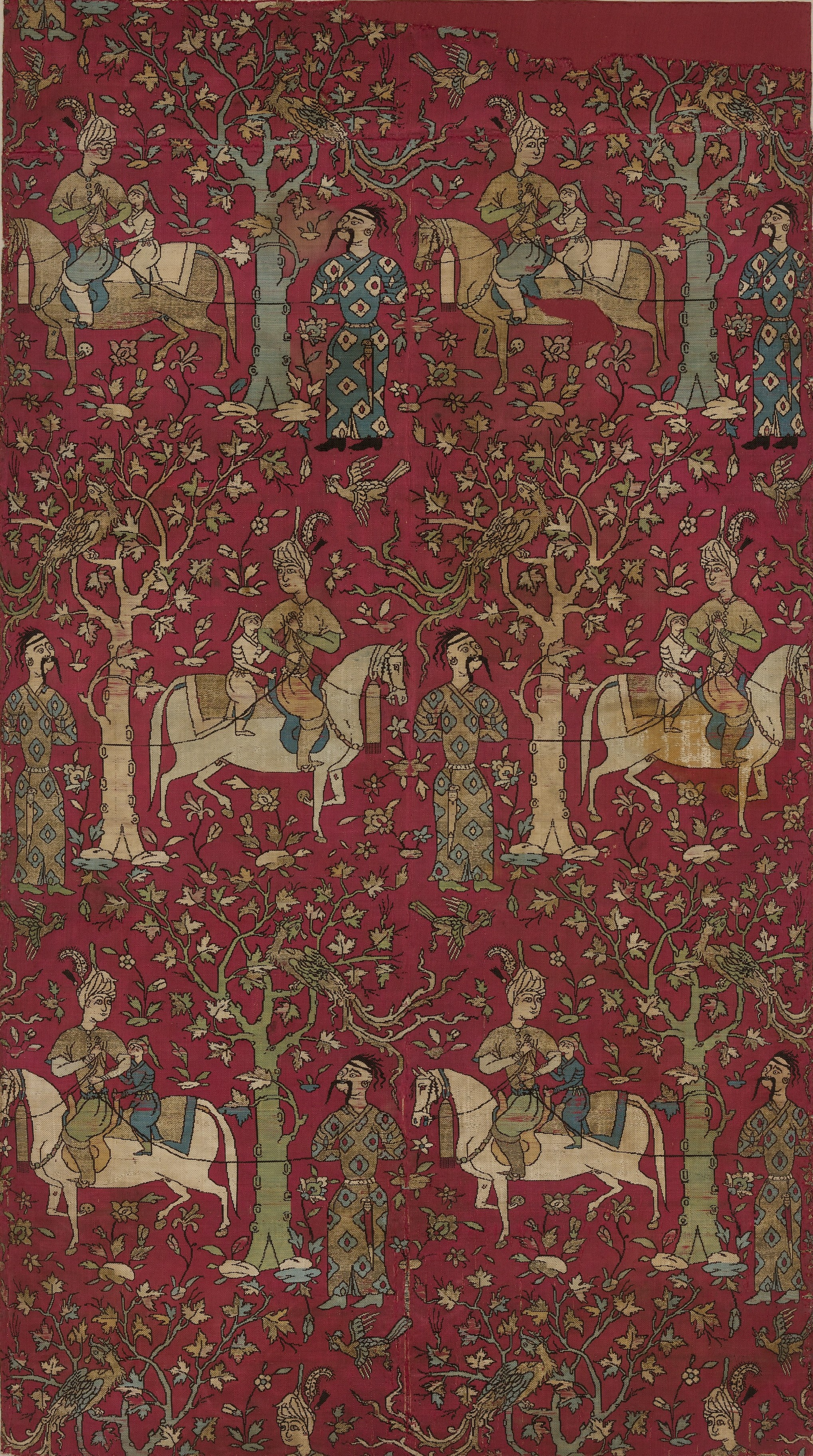
Safavid courtiers leading Georgian captives. A mid-16th century Persian textile panel from the Metropolitan Museum of Art

Tahmasp was interested in the Caucasus, especially Georgia, for two reasons: to reduce the influence of the Ostajlu tribe (who kept their lands in southern Georgia and Armenia after the 1526 civil war) and a desire for booty, similar to that of his father. Since the Georgians were mainly Christian, he used the pretext of Jihad (Islamic armed struggle against nonbelievers) to justify the invasion. Between 1540 and 1553, Tahmasp led four campaigns against the Georgian kingdoms. The Safavid army looted Tbilisi, including its churches and the wives and children of the nobility, in the first campaign. Tahmasp also forced the governor of Tbilisi, Golbad, to convert to Islam. The King of Kartli, Luarsab I (r. 1527–1556), managed to escape and went to hiding during Tahmasp's raiding. During his second invasion, ostensibly to ensure the stability of Georgian territory, he looted the farms and subjugated Levan of Kakheti (r. 1518–1574).

One year before the Peace of Amasya in 1554, Tahmasp led his last military campaign into the Caucasus. Throughout his campaigns, he took many prisoners, and this time he brought 30,000 Georgians to Iran. Luarsab's mother, Nestan Darejan was captured during these campaigns, but committed suicide upon incarceration. The descendants of these prisoners formed a "third force" in the Safavid administration and bureaucracy with the Turkomans and Persians and became a main rival to the other two during the later years of the Safavid Empire. Although this "third force" came to power two generations later during the reign of Tahmasp's grandson, Abbas the Great (r. 1588–1629), it began infiltrating Tahmasp's army during the second quarter of his reign as gholams (slave warriors) and qorchis (royal bodyguards of the shah) and became more influential at the apex of the Safavid empire. Due to an upbringing marred by Qizilbash power struggles, Tahmasp I preferred the gholams because of their lack of tribal ties and family responsibilities.

In 1555, following the Peace of Amasya, eastern Georgia remained in Iranian hands and western Georgia was ruled by the Turks. Never again did Tahmasp appear on the Caucasus frontier after the treaty. Instead, the Governor of Georgia, Shahverdi Sultan, represented Safavid power north of the Aras River. Tahmasp sought to establish his dominance by imposing several Iranian political and social institutions and placing converts to Islam on the thrones of Kartli and Kakheti; one was Daud Khan, brother of Simon I of Kartli (r. 1556–1569, 1578–1600). Son of Levan of Kakheti, Prince Jesse also appeared in Qazvin during the 1560s and converted to Islam. In return, Tahmasp granted him favours and gifts. The prince was given the old royal palace for his residence in Qazvin, and became the governor of Shaki and adjacent territories. The conversion of these Georgian princes did not dissuade the Georgian forces who tried to reconquer Tbilisi under Simon I and his father, Luarsab I, in the Battle of Garisi; the battle ended in a stalemate, with Luarsab and the Safavid commander Shahverdi Sultan both slain in battle.

=== Unstable partnership with the Portuguese Empire ===
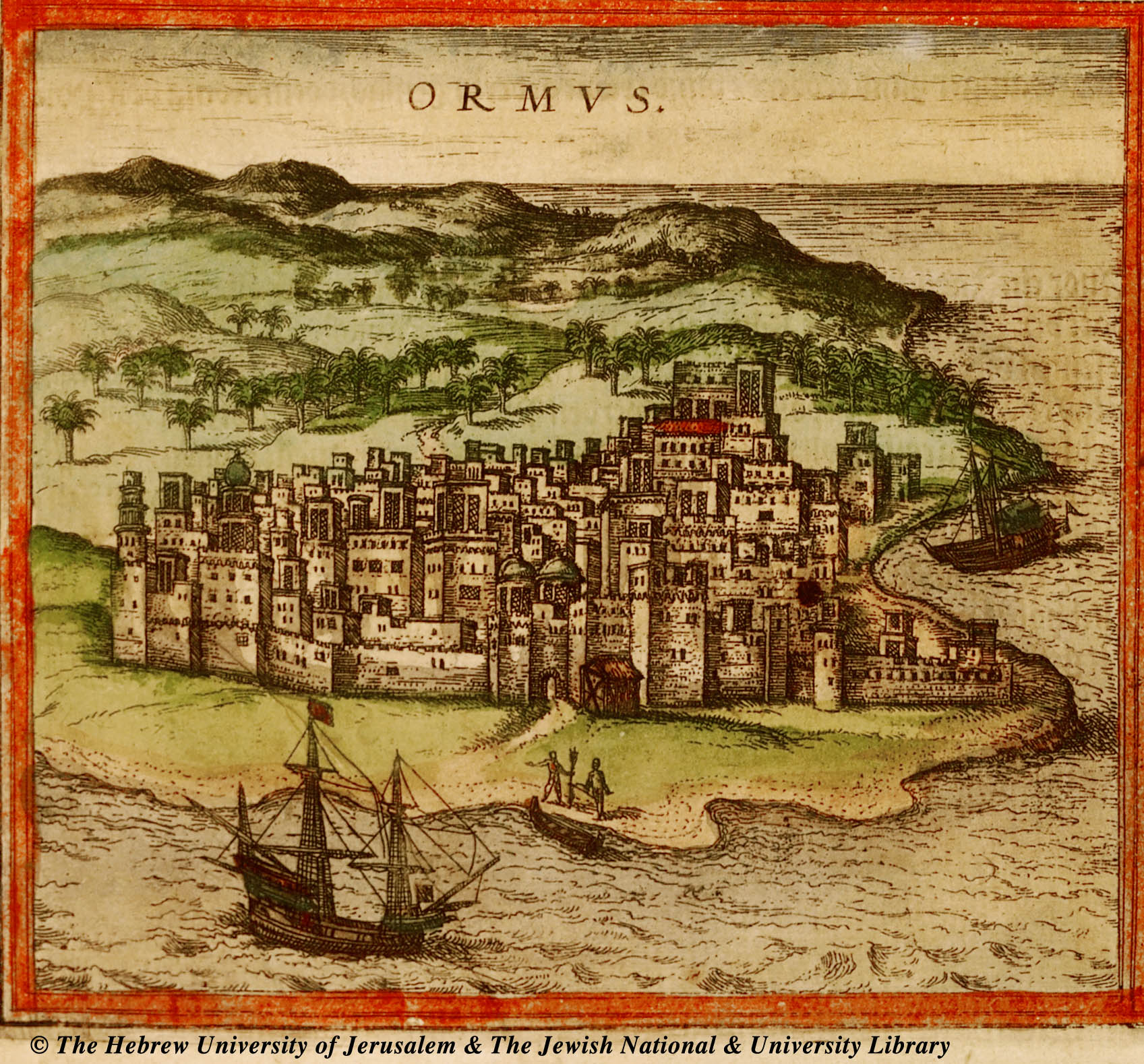
Drawing of Hormuz by Georg Braun, dated 1572

Throughout his rule, Tahmasp generally had an unclear and indifferent stance towards the Portuguese Empire. Although he still declined to cancel his alliance with the Portuguese at the request of Badr Bu Tuwayrik (r. 1516–1569/70), the emir of Hadhramaut, in the southern part of the Arabian Peninsula. With the exception of the two Portuguese operations against Rishahr in 1534 and 1540, Tahmasp very rarely valued his alliance with the Portuguese.

Especially between 1545 and 1555, the Safavids were forced to shift their trade toward the Hormuz Island because the traditional overland routes to the Levant were severed by the Ottoman wars. This transition led to frequent diplomatic and customs disputes with the Portuguese, the suzerain of the Kingdom of Hormuz. Tahmasp used the moqarrariyeh system (Note: Moqarrariyeh was an annual fixed sum given by the Kingdom of Hormuz to the rulers of the Iranian plateau since at least the 13th century to safeguard the movement of trade caravans to and from the Hormuz Island.) to justify his involvement in Hormuz's commerce, persistently pressure the Portuguese for his share of the revenue, and assert Iranian sovereignty over the region.

Under orders from the Portuguese king John III (r. 1521–1557), his official Jorge Cabral sent an embassy led by Enrique de Macedo to Tahmasp in 1550. The mission aimed to forge a coalition to challenge Ottoman control over Basra. An incident involving the conversion of the wife and daughter Safavid envoy by the Portuguese briefly heightened tensions between Tahmasp and the Portuguese, but it was resolved. Tahmasp favored Portuguese control of Hormuz over Ottoman control, prompting him to propose a joint assault on Ottoman-ruled Qatif, but it was never carried out.

Preoccupied with Ottomans on his western frontier, Tahmasp did not pay attention subsequent Ottoman attempts to expel the Portuguese from the Persian Gulf in 1552–1560. Between 1565–1568, the Habsburg monarchy, Spain, Portugal, and the Papal States tried to form a military alliance with Iran to force the Ottoman Empire into a two-front war. Because Ottoman control made the land route too dangerous for an embassy, the Habsburg monarchy and Spain planned for the appointed ambassador, Richard Shelley, to travel to Iran through Moscow, Kazan, and Astrakhan, and return through Hormuz.

Ultimately, the alliance failed to take place due to slow negotiations and conflicting interests between the three European powers. The Ottomans, who did not like to fight at two fronts, signed a peace treaty with the Habsburg monarchy in 1568. In 1569, Minab, Shamil and Tezerg were briefly captured by Yaqub Beg, the governor of the Kerman province. The operation had been ordered by Tahmasp, due to the alleged tyranny of the authorities in the area. The captured areas were soon returned, though it is unknown how.

=== Royal refugees ===
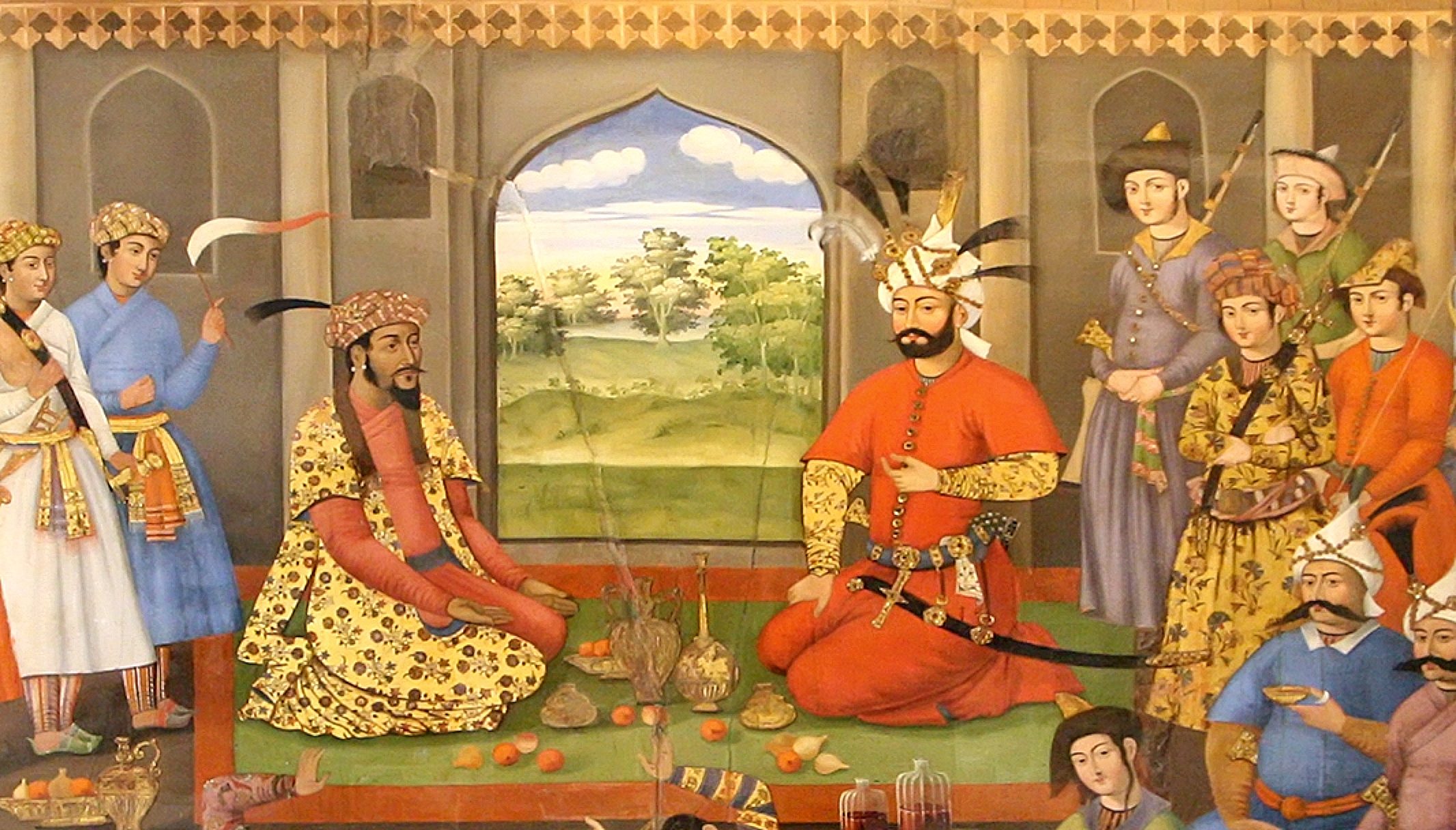
A later depiction of the encounter of Mughal Emperor Humayun (left) and Shah Tahmasp I (right) in Soltaniyeh in 1544. Chehel Sotoun Palace, Isfahan, commissioned circa 1647 by his fifth-generation descendant Abbas II. Shah Tahmasp provided Humayun with 12,000 cavalry and 300 veterans of his personal guard along with provisions, so that his guests may recover their lost domains.

One of the most celebrated events of Tahmasp's reign was the visit of Humayun (r. 1530–1540), the eldest son of Babur (r. 1526–1530) and emperor of the Mughal Empire, who faced rebellions by his brothers. Humayun fled to Herat, travelled through Mashhad, Nishapur, Sabzevar, and Qazvin, and met Tahmasp at Soltaniyeh in 1544. Tahmasp honoured Homayun as a guest and gave him an illustrated version of Saadi's Gulistan dating back to the reign of Abu Sa'id Mirza (r. 1451–1469, 1459–1469), Humayun's great-grandfather; however, he refused to give him political assistance unless he converted to Shia Islam. Humayun reluctantly agreed, but reverted to Sunni Islam when he returned to India; however he did not force the Iranian Shias, who came with him to India, to convert.

Tahmasp also demanded a quid pro quo in which the city of Kandahar would be given to his infant son, Morad Mirza. Humayun spent Nowruz in the Shah's court and left in 1545 with an army provided by Tahmasp to regain his lost lands; his first conquest was Kandahar, which he ceded to the young Safavid prince. Morad Mirza soon died, however, and the city became a bone of contention between the two empires: the Safavids claimed that it had been given to them in perpetuity, while the Mughals maintained that it had been an appanage that expired with the death of the prince. Tahmasp began the first Safavid expedition to Kandahar in 1558, after the death of Humayun, and reconquered the city.

Another notable visitor to Tahmasp's court was Şehzade Bayezid, the fugitive Ottoman prince who rebelled against his father, Suleiman the Magnificent, and went to the Shah in the autumn 1559 with an army of 10,000 to persuade him to begin a war against the Ottomans. Although he honoured Bayezid, Tahmasp did not want to disturb the Peace of Amasya. Suspecting that Bayezid was planning a coup, he had him arrested and returned to the Ottomans; Bayezid and his children were immediately executed.

=== Later life and death ===
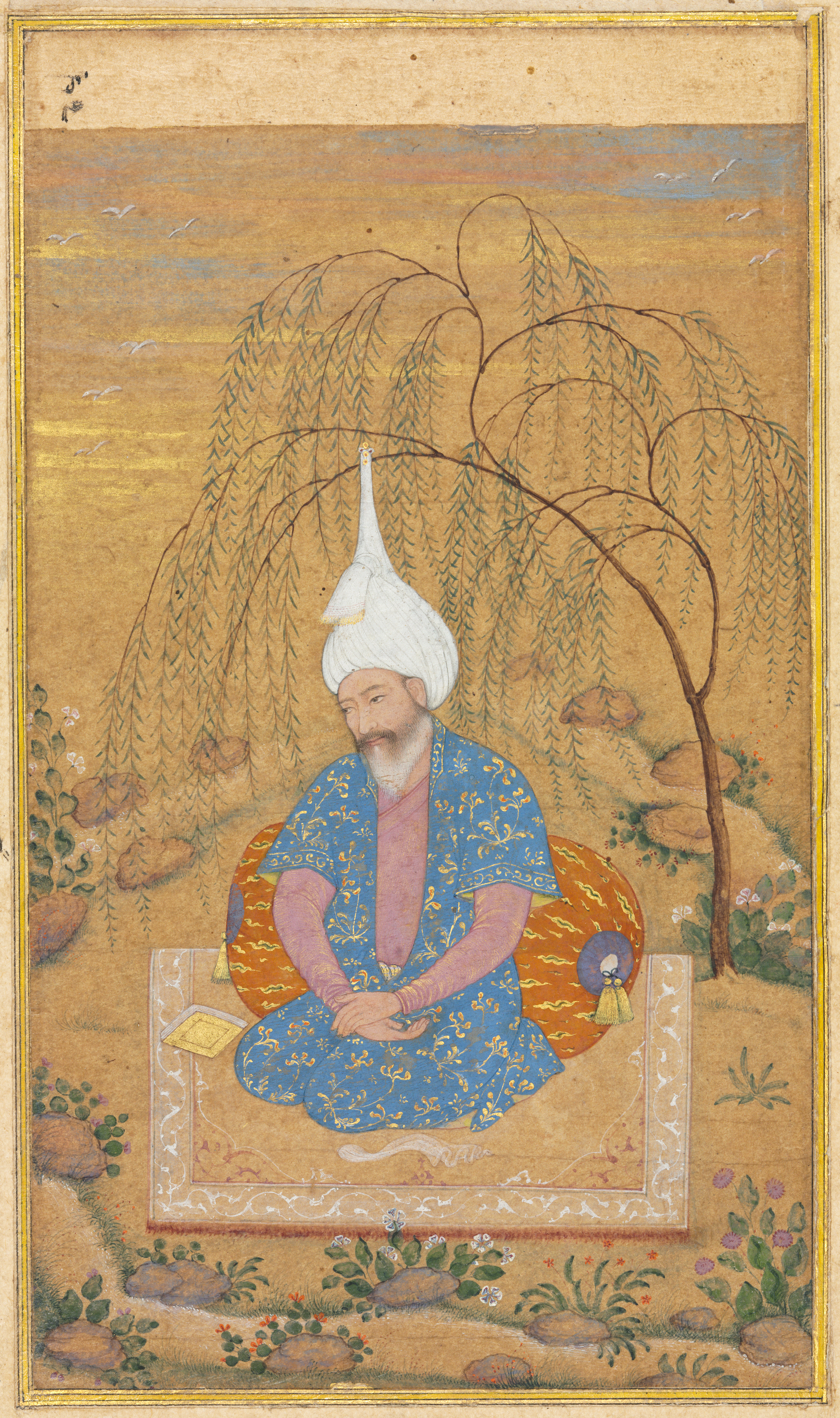
An aged Shah Tahmasp, painted c. 1575, Qazvin. Cleveland Museum of Art

In 1555, Shah Tahmasp transferred the capital from Tabriz to Qazvin, located at a greater distance from the Ottoman Empire. In 1556, he promulgated his "Edict of Sincere Repentance", an affirmation of piety and formal religiosity which involved his renunciation of "undisciplined passions", including dancing, music, wine, sodomy, and painting.

Although Tahmasp rarely left Qazvin from the Peace of Amasya in 1555 to his death in 1576, he was still active during this period. A 1564 rebellion in Herat was suppressed by Masum Bek and the Khorasan governors, but the region remained troubled and was raided by the Uzbeks two years later. Tahmasp became seriously ill in 1574 and neared death twice in two months. Since he had not chosen a crown prince, the question of succession was raised by members of the royal family and Qizilbash leaders. His favourite son, Haydar Mirza, was supported by the Ustajlu tribe and the powerful Georgian court faction; the imprisoned prince Ismail Mirza was supported by Pari Khan Khanum, Tahmasp's influential daughter. (Note: Ismail Mirza had been imprisoned since 1557. Different reasons are suggested as to why the shah had put him in jail; amongst them being his paranoia of Ismail, Ismail's recurrent attacks on the Ottoman borderlands, thus being a threat to the Peace of Amasya, and being under the influence of his grand vizier Ma'sum Beg Safavi (who was also the lala to Haydar Mirza).) The pro-Haydar faction tried to eliminate Ismail by winning the favour of the castellan of Qahqaheh Castle (where Ismail was imprisoned), but Pari Khan learned about the plot and informed Tahmasp; the shah, who was still fond of his son, ordered him to be guarded by Afshar musketeers.

Tahmasp, recovered from his illness, returned his attention to affairs of state. Remaining court tensions, however, triggered another civil war when the shah died on 14 May 1576 from poisoning. The poisoning was blamed on Abu Naser Gilani, a physician who attended Tahmasp when he was ill. According to Tarikh-e Alam-ara-ye Abbasi, "He unwisely sought recognition of his superior status vis-à-vis the other physicians; as a result, when Tahmasp died, Abu Nasr was accused of treachery in the treatment he had prescribed, and he was put to death within the palace by members of the qurchi". Tahmasp I had the longest reign of any member of the Safavid dynasty: nine days short of fifty-two years. He died without a designated heir and the two factions in his court clashed for the throne. Haydar Mirza was murdered not long after his father's death, and Ismail Mirza became king and was crowned Ismail II (r. 1576–1577). Less than two months after his enthronement, Ismail ordered a mass purge of all male members of the royal family. Only Mohammad Khodabanda, already nearly blind, and his three toddler sons survived this purge.

Shah Tahmasp was buried at the Imam Reza shrine in Mashhad, a prestigious shrine he had greatly supported and renovated. Soon after his burial though, the fear of Uzbek incursions in Mashhad led Ismail II to move the body, and its final resting place is now uncertain.

== Policies ==
=== Policies of Administration ===
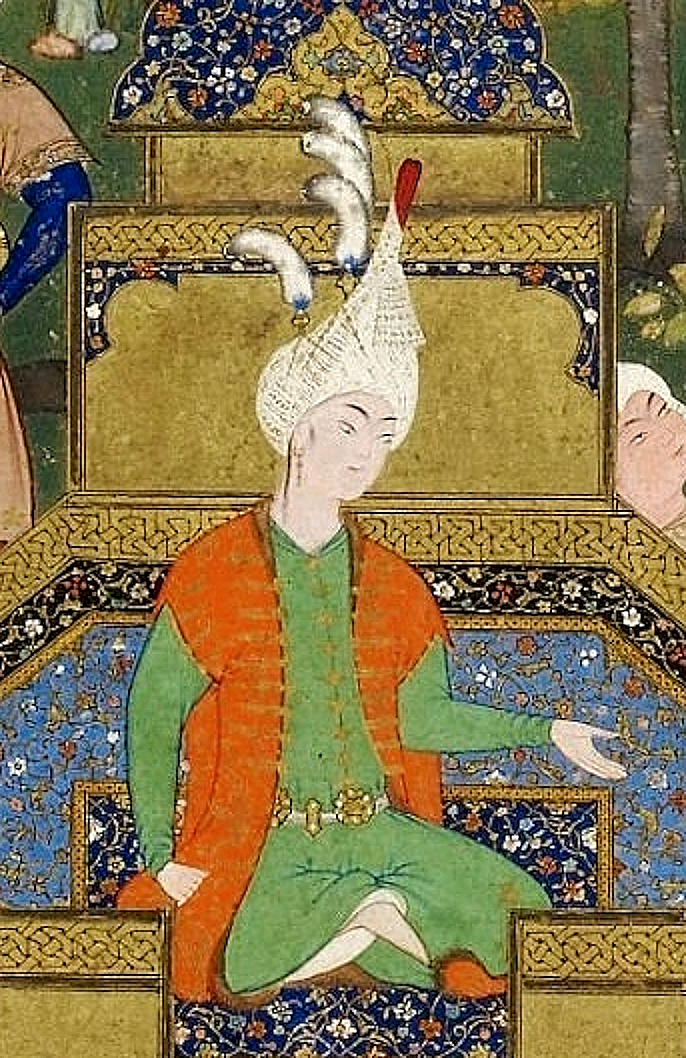
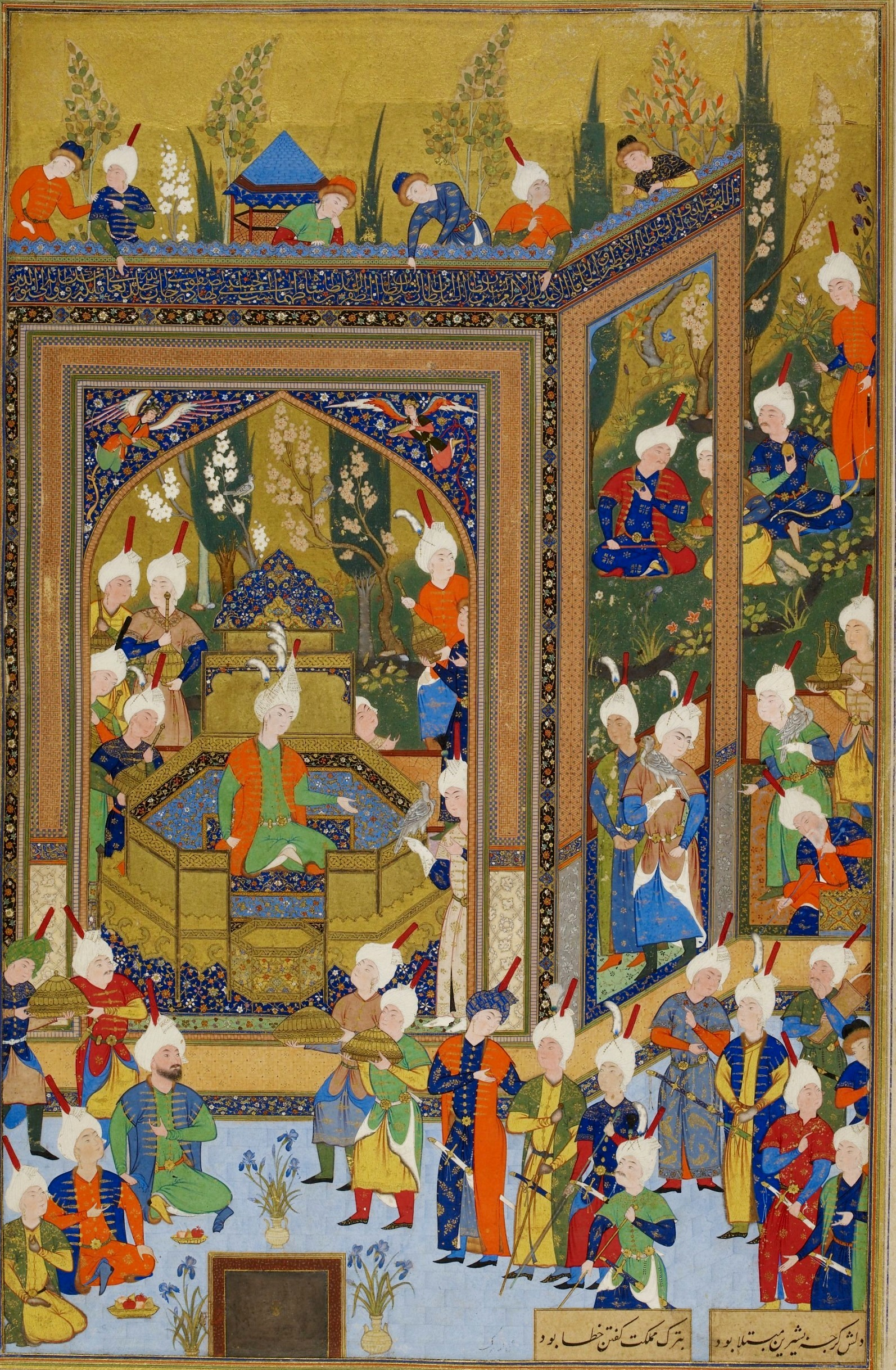
A depiction of Shah Tahmasp and his court, with the name and titles of the ruler inscribed over the building. Khamsa of Nizami of Shah Tahmasp, 1539-1543.

Tahmasp's reign after the civil wars between the Qizilbash leaders became a "personal rule" that sought to control Turkoman influence by empowering the Persian bureaucracy. The key change was the 1535 appointment of Qazi Jahan Qazvini, who extended diplomacy beyond Iran by establishing contact with the Portuguese, the Venetians, the Mughals, and the Shiite Deccan sultanates. English explorer Anthony Jenkinson, who was received at the Safavid court in 1562, also sought to promote trade. The Habsburgs were eager to ally with the Safavids against the Ottomans. In 1529, Ferdinand I (r. 1558–1564) sent an envoy to Iran with the objective of a two-front attack on the Ottoman Empire the following year. The mission was unsuccessful, however, since the envoy took over a year to return. The first extant Safavid letters to a European power were sent in 1540 to Doge of Venice Pietro Lando (r. 1538–1545). In response, the Doge and the Great Council of Venice commissioned Michel Membré to visit the Safavid court. In 1540, he visited Tahmasp's encampment at Marand, near Tabriz. Membré's mission lasted for three years, during which, he wrote the Relazione di Persia, one of the few European sources which describe Tahmasp's court. In his letter to Lando, Tahmasp promised to "cleanse the earth of [Ottoman] wickedness" with the help of the Holy League. The alliance, however, never bore fruit.

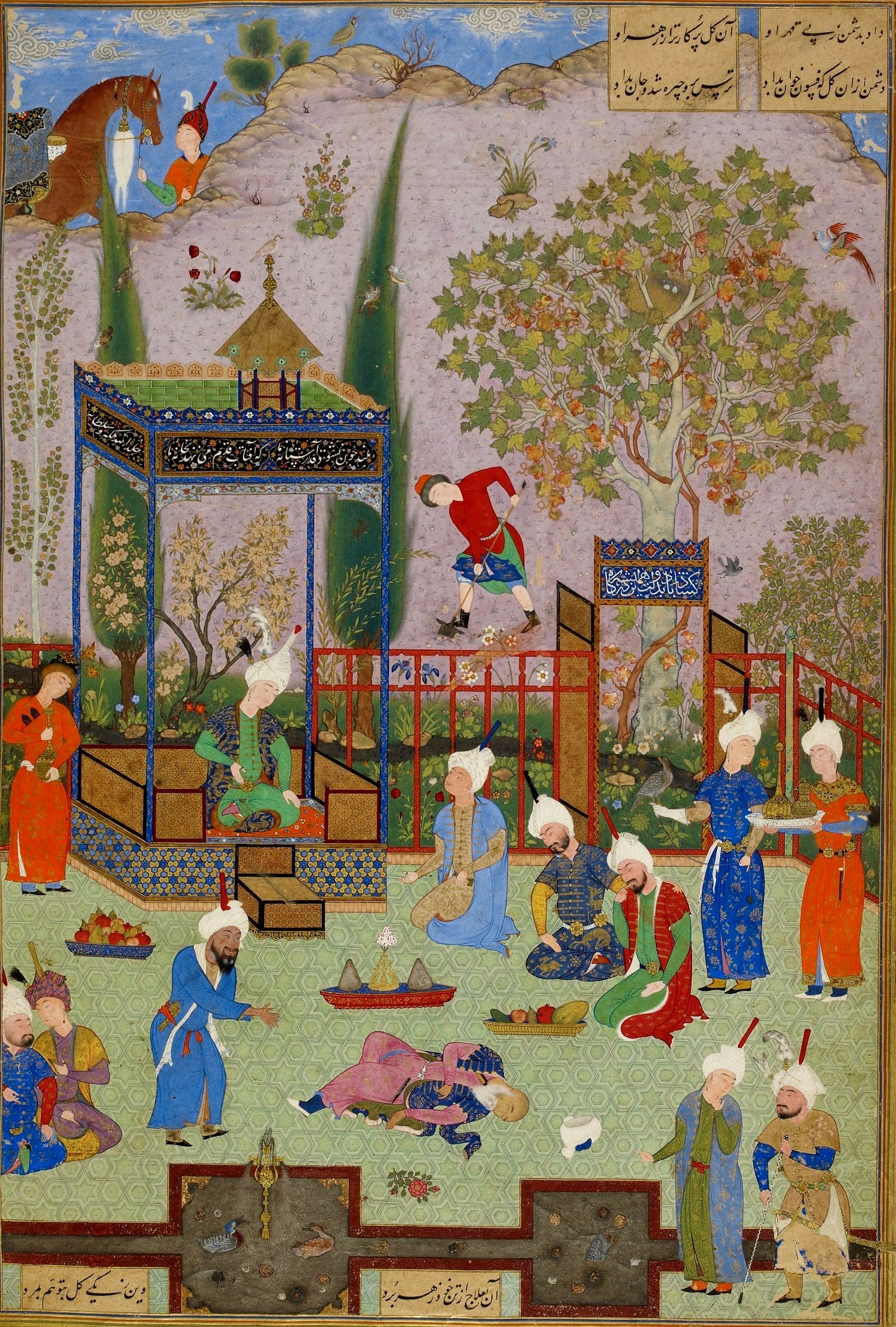
The argument of the two doctors, an accurate contemporary depiction of Shah Tahmasp and his court. Painted by Aqa Mirak, court painter of Shah Tahmasp, 1539-1543, Khamsa of Nizami, British Museum Or.2265. (Note: "The picture is also rewarding as an accurate description of the costumes, noblemen, and setting at Shah Tahmasp's court" in Welch 1976, p. 76)

One of the most important events of Tahmasp's reign was his relocation of the Safavid capital, which began what is known as the Qazvin period. Although the exact date is uncertain, Tahmasp began preparations to have the royal capital moved from Tabriz to Qazvin during a 1540s period of ethnic re-settlement. The move from Tabriz to Qazvin discontinued the Turco-Mongol tradition of shifting between summer and winter pastures with the herds, ending Ismail I's nomadic lifestyle. The idea of a Turkoman state with a center in Tabriz was abandoned for an empire centered on the Iranian plateau. Moving into a city that linked the realm to Khorasan through an ancient route, allowed a greater degree of centralisation as distant provinces such as Shirvan, Georgia, and Gilan were brought into the Safavid fold. The incorporation of Gilan in particular was vital to the Safavids. To ensure his permanent control on the province, Tahmasp arranged royal marriages with the influential families in Gilan. Qazvin's non-Qizilbash population allowed Tahmasp to bring new members to his court who were unrelated to the Turkoman tribes. (Note: As further explained by the modern historian, Colin P. Mitchell: "A more appealing explanation for basing the central, royal administration in Qazvin lies with the aforementioned agenda of minimizing undue Turkic influence in the Safavid court. As Hans Roemer (2008, p. 249) observed, there was no need to see a policy of 'Persianization' in this move, but undoubtedly 'the idea of a Turkmen state with its center at Tabriz and its fulcrum in eastern Anatolia, Mesopotamia, and northwestern Persia was abandoned.' The decision to replace Tabriz as the imperial center, a city that had historically been the hub of several Mongol and Turkmen dynasties such as the Il-khanids, the Qara Qoyunlus, and the Āq Qoyunlus, was concurrent with a decision by the shah to populate and staff his court and army with members of a new, non-Qezelbāš constituency.") The city, associated with orthodoxy and stable governance, developed under Tahmasp's patronage; the era's foremost building is Chehel Sotoun.

From the transition of capitals, a new era in history-writing emerged under Tahmasp's rule. The Safavid historiography, which until then relied only on historians outside of Safavid's influence, matured and became a valued project in Tahmasp's new court. Tahmasp is the only Safavid monarch to have recorded his memories, known as Tazkera-ye Shah Tahmasb. On the shah's behalf, Abdi Beg Shirazi, a secretary-accountant in the royal chancellery, wrote a world history named Takmelat al-akhbar, which he dedicated it to Pari Khan Khanum, Tahmasp's daughter. Although intended to be a world history, only the last part of the book which covers the reigns of Ismail I and Tahmasp up until 1570 was published. He also commissioned Abol-Fath Hosseini to rewrite Safvat as-safa, the oldest surviving text regarding Safi-ad-din Ardabili and the Sufi beliefs of the Safavids, in order to legitimise his sayyid claim. All of the historians under Tahmasp's patronage centred their works around one main goal: to tell the history of the Safavid dynasty. They defined themselves as 'Safavid' historians, as living in a Safavid period of Iranian history, a concept that had not been seen in the earlier chronicles of the dynasty. This new definition has its roots in the change of the capital and the urbanisation of the Safavid nomadic lifestyle. Historians such as Charles Melville and Sholeh Quinn thus consider Tahmasp's reign as the start of the "real flourishing of Safavid historiography".

=== Military ===
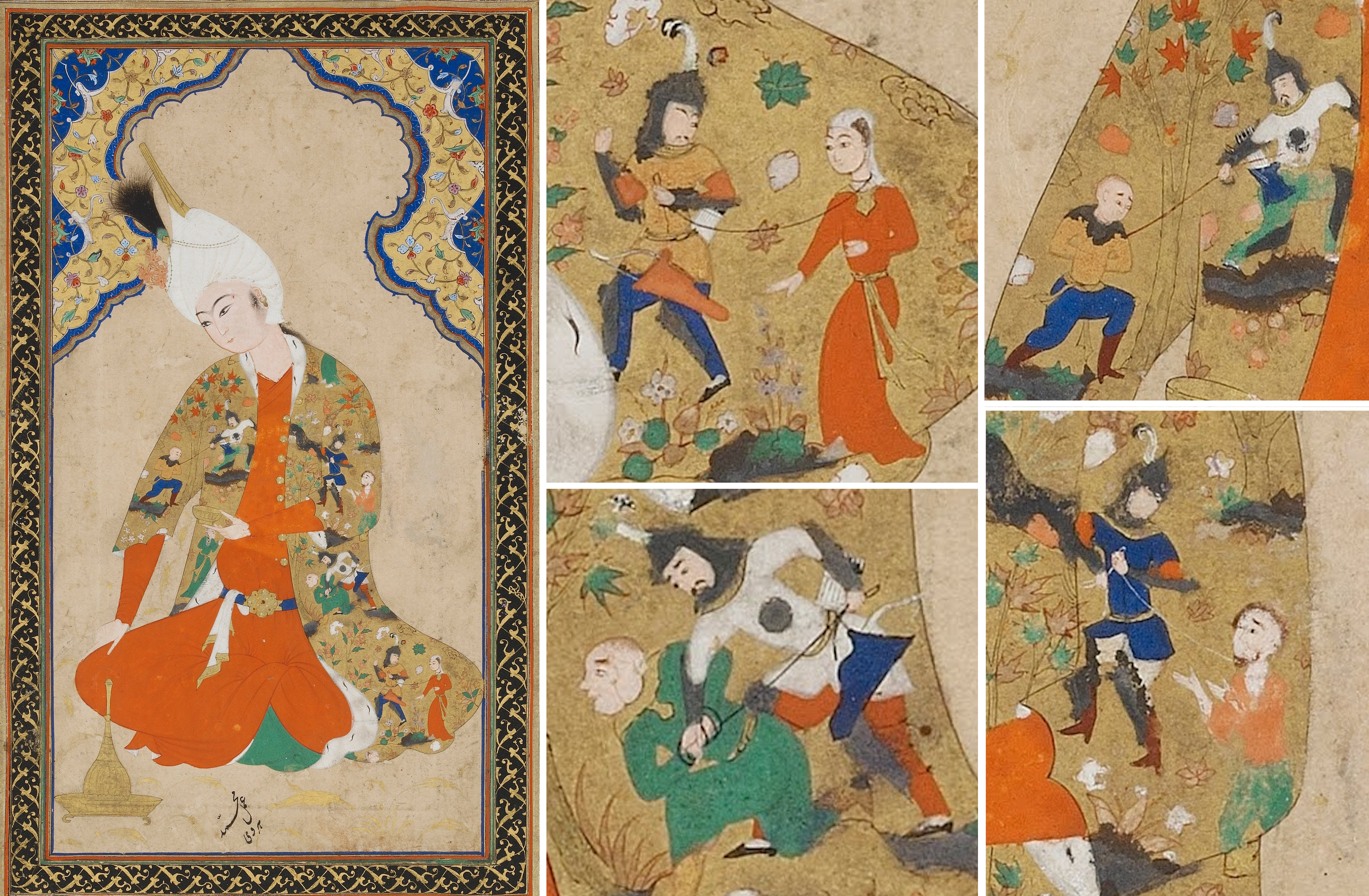
Young prince, wearing a coat with scenes of warriors taking both male and female Georgian prisoners. Painted by Muhammad Haravi, "art of the court of Shah Tahmasp", mid-16th century.

The Safavid military evolved during Tahmasp's reign. The first corps of gunners (tupchiyan) and musketeers (tufangchiyan), developed initially during Ismail I's reign, came to be used in his army. A court chronicle's retelling of Battle of Jam and a military review in 1530 show that the Safavid army was armed with several hundred light canons and several thousand infantrymen. Gollar-aghasis, military slaves developed by Tahmasp from Caucasus prisoners, commanded the tufangchiyan and tupchiyan. To lessen Qizilbash power, he discontinued the titles of amir al-umara and vakil. The qurchi-bashi (the commander of the qurchis), formerly subordinate to the amir al-umara, became the chief Safavid military officer.

After the Peace of Amasya in 1555, Tahmasp became an avaricious person who did not care how and where his troops obtained their pay, even if it was through criminal means. By 1575, Iran's troops had not been paid for four years. They are said to have accepted this because, as one chronicler put it, 'they loved the shah so much'.

=== Religion ===
Tahmasp described himself as a "pious Shia mystic king". His religious views and the extent to which they influenced Safavid religious policy is the most interesting aspect of his reign for historians, both contemporary and modern. As the Italian historian Biancamaria Scarcia Amoretti has noted, "the modern originality of Persian Shi'ism has its roots [with Shah Tahmasp]". Until 1533, the Qizilbash leaders (worshipping Ismail I as the promised Mahdi) urged the young Tahmasp to continue in his father's footsteps; that year, he had a spiritual rebirth, performed an act of repentance and outlawed irreligious behaviour.

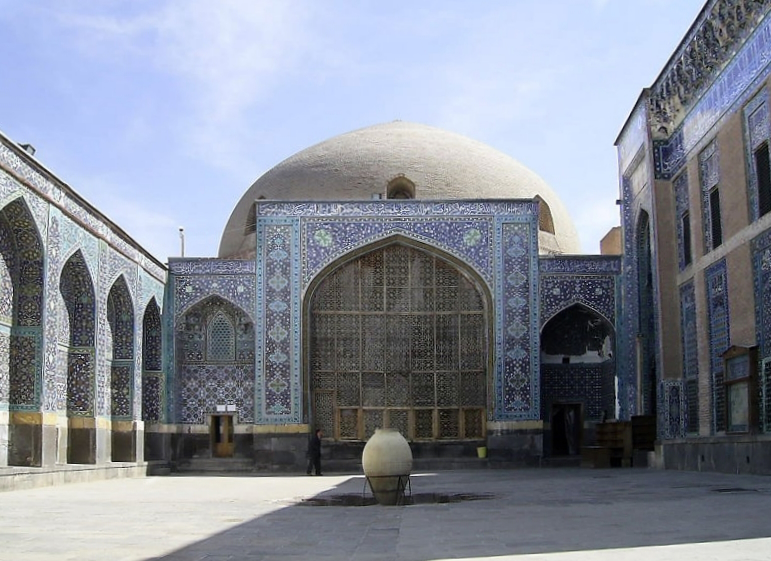
The Jannatsarā was built by Shah Tahmasp in 1537 at the Shrine of Sheikh Safi, Ardabil.

Tahmasp rejected his father's claim of being a mahdi, becoming a mystical lover of Ali and a king bound to sharia, but still enjoyed villagers travelling to his palace in Qazvin to touch his clothing. Tahmasp held firmly to the controversial Shia belief in the imminent coming of the Mahdi. He refused to allow his favourite sister, Mahinbanu Soltanum, to marry, because he was keeping her as a bride for the Mahdi. He claimed connections with Ali and Sufi saints, such as his ancestor Safi al-Din, through dreams in which he foresaw the future. Tahmasp had other superstitious beliefs too; for instance, his obsession with the occult science of geomancy. According to the Venetian diplomat, Vincenzo degli Alessandri, the shah was so devoted to practice geomancy that he had not left his palace for a decade. He also observed that Tahmasp was worshipped by his people as a godlike being possessing a frail and old body. Tahmasp wanted the poets of his court to write about Ali, rather than him. He sent copies of the Quran as gifts to several Ottoman sultans; overall, during his reign, eighteen copies of the Quran were sent to Constantinople and all were encrusted with jewels and gold.

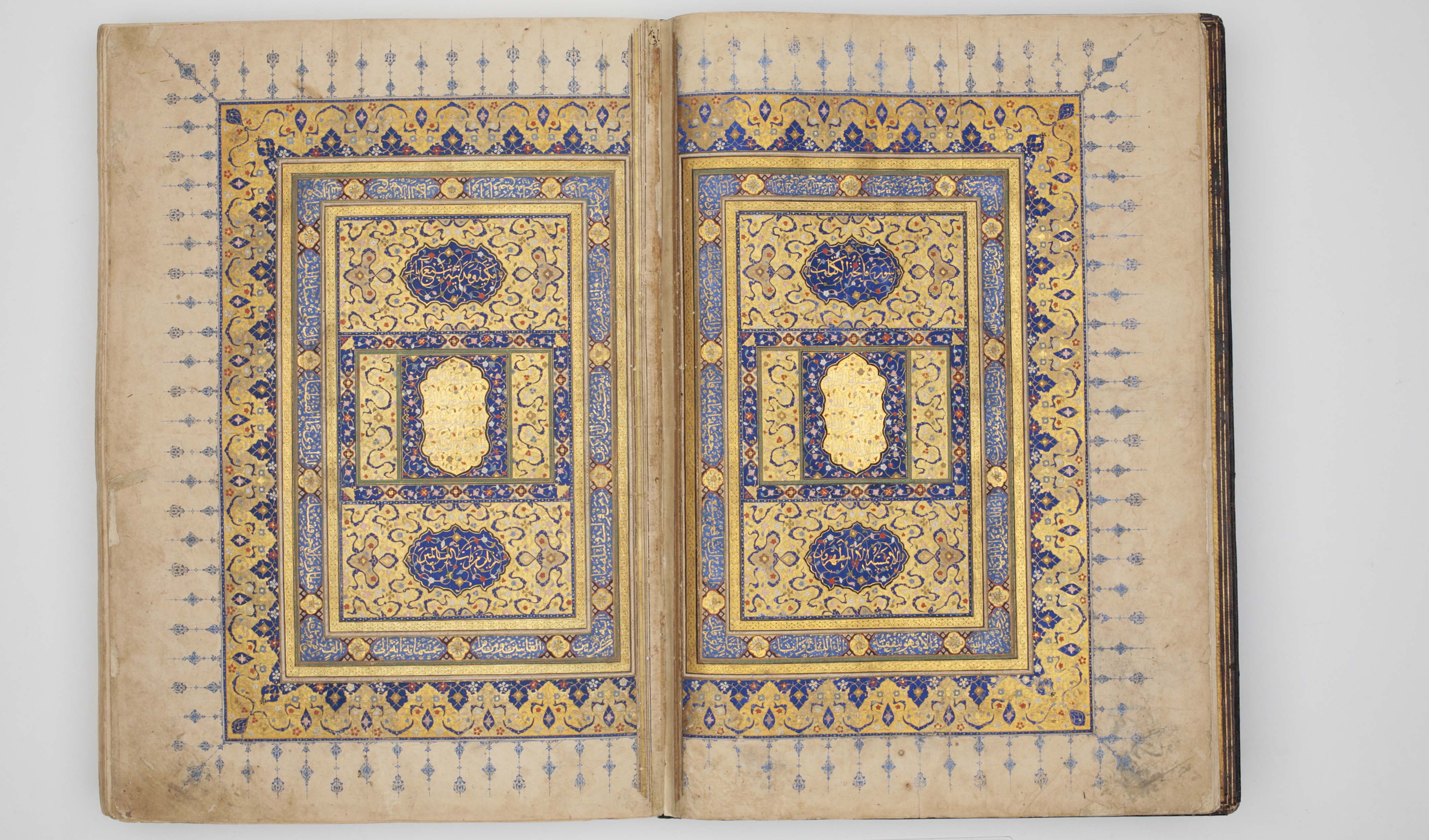
A Quran probably belonging to Tahmasp I, dated July–August 1552, created in Shiraz or Qazvin

Tahmasp saw Twelverism as a new doctrine of kingship, giving the ulama authority in religious and legal matters, and appointing Shaykh Ali al-Karaki as the deputy of the Hidden Imam. This brought new political and court power to the mullahs (Islamic clerics), sayyids, and their networks, intersecting Tabriz, Qazvin, Isfahan, and the recently incorporated centres of Rasht, Astarabad, and Amol. As observed by Iskandar Beg Munshi, the court chronicler, the sayyids as a class of landed elite enjoyed considerable power. During the 1530s and 1540s, they hegemonised the Safavid court in Tabriz and according to Iskandar Beg, "any wish of theirs was translated into reality almost before it was uttered… although they were guilty of unlawful practices". During Tahmasp's reign, Persian scholars accepted the Safavid claims to sayyid heritage and called him "the Husaynid". Tahmasp embarked on a wide-scale urban program designed to reinvent the city of Qazvin as a centre of Shiite piety and orthodoxy, expanding the Shrine of Husayn (son of Ali al-Rida, the eighth Imam). He was also attentive to his ancestral Sufi order in Ardabil, building the Janat Sarai mosque to encourage visitors and hold Sama (Sufi spiritual ceremony). Tahmasp ordered the practice of Sufi rituals and had Sufis and mullahs come to his palace and perform public acts of piety and zikr (a form of Islamic meditation) for Eid al-Fitr (and renew their allegiance to him). This encouraged Tahmasp's followers to see themselves as belonging to a community too large to be bound by tribal or other local social orders. Although Tahmasp continued the Shia conversion in Iran, unlike his father he did not coerce other religious groups; he had a long-established acknowledgment and patronage of Christian Armenians.

=== Arts ===
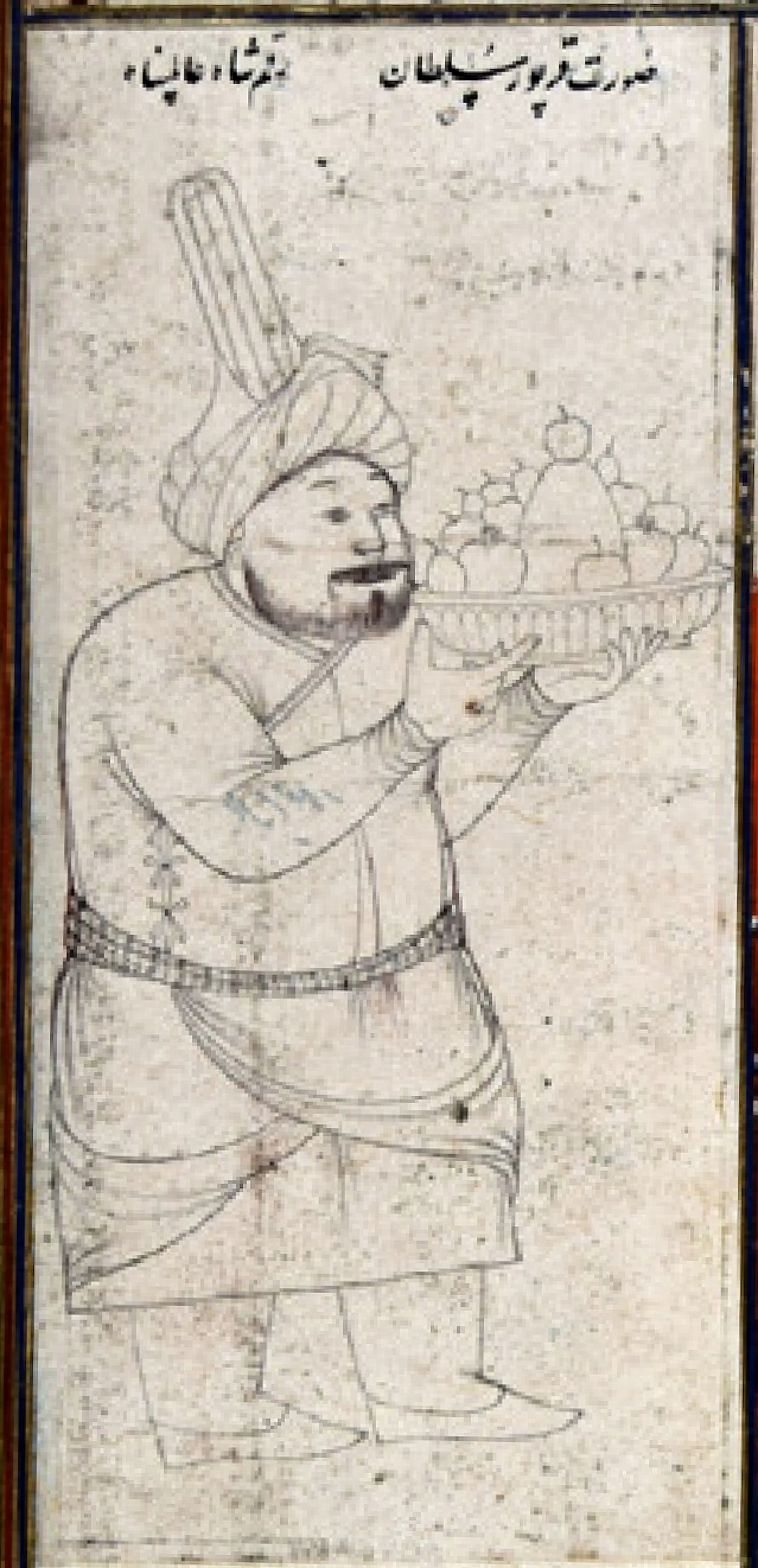
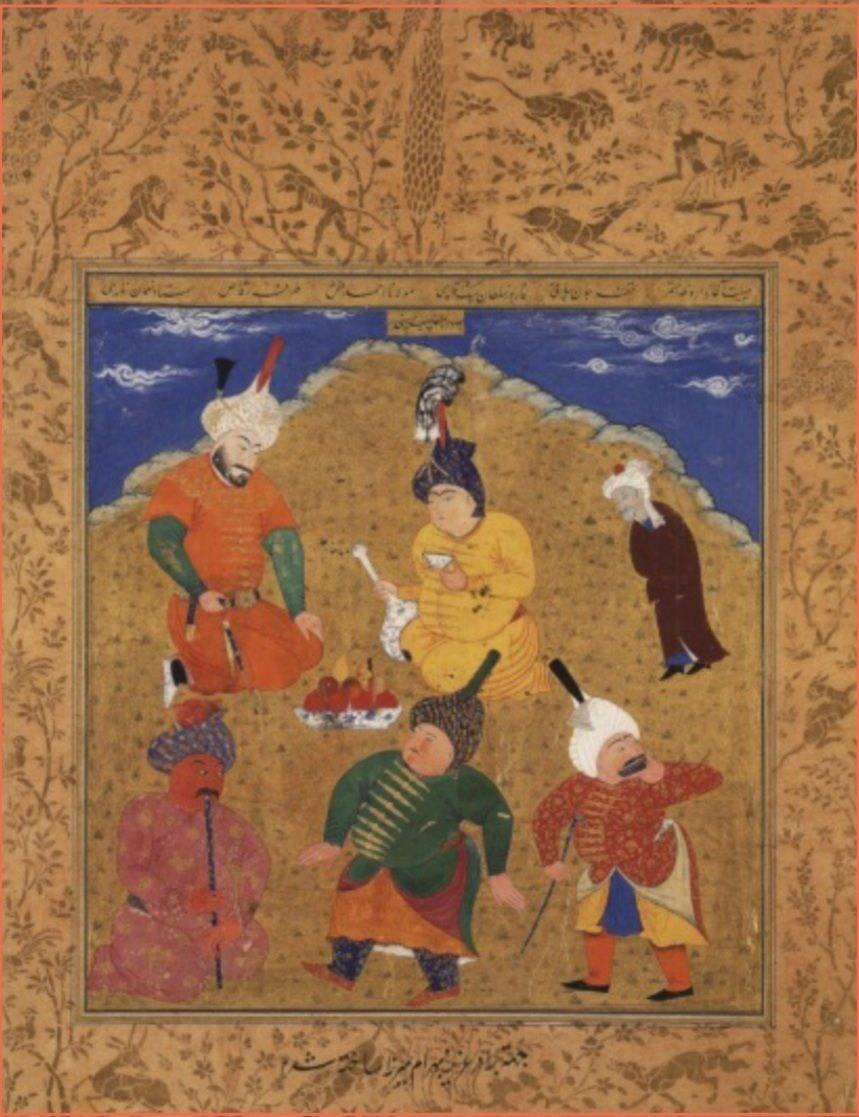
Satyrical illustrations created and signed by Shah Ṭahmāsp himself for his brother Bahrām Mirzā's Bahram Mirza Album circa 1530–1540. Bahram Mirza Album.

In his youth, Tahmasp was inclined towards calligraphy and art and patronised masters in both. His preeminent and acclaimed contribution to the Safavid arts was his patronage of Persian miniature manuscripts that took place during the first half of his reign. He was the namesake of one of the most celebrated illustrated manuscripts of the Shahnameh, which was commissioned by his father around 1522 and completed during the mid-1530s. He encouraged painters such as Kamāl ud-Dīn Behzād, bestowing a royal painting workshop for masters, journeymen, and apprentices with exotic materials such as ground gold and lapis lazuli. Tahmasp's artists illustrated the Khamsa of Nizami, and he worked on Chehel Sotoun's balcony paintings. The Tarikh-e Alam-ara-ye Abbasi calls Tahmasp's reign the zenith of Safavid calligraphic and pictorial art. Tahmasp lost interest in the miniature arts around 1555 and, accordingly, disbanded the royal workshop and allowed his artists to practice elsewhere, particularly at the Mughal court of Humayun (artists Mirza Ali and Mir Sayyid Ali). His patronage of arts, however, has been praised by many modern art historians such as James Elkins and Stuart Cary Welch. The American historian, Douglas Streusand, calls him 'the greatest Safavid patron'. Colin P. Mitchell associates Tahmasp's patronage with the revival of Iranian artistic and cultural life.

The reigns of Tahmasp and his father, Ismail I, are considered as the most productive era of the history of the Azeri Turkish language and literature. The renowned poet, Fuzuli, who wrote in Azeri Turkish, Persian, and Arabic, flourished during this era. In his memoir, Tahmasp denotes his love for both Persian and Turkish poetry. During the later years of his life, however, he came to despise poets and poetry; as his devotion to the Quran increased, he no longer counted poets as pious men, for many of them were addicted to wine, an irreligious behaviour. Tahmasp refused to allow poets in his court and ceased to regard them with favour. According to Tazkera-ye Tohfe-ye Sāmi by his brother, Sam Mirza, there were 700 poets during the reigns of the first two Safavid kings. After Tahmasp's religious conversion, many joined Humayun; those who remained and wrote erotic ghazals (sonnets), such as Vahshi Bafqi and Mohtasham Kashani, were shunned. Other poets such as Naziri Nishapuri and 'Orfi Shirazi chose to leave Iran and emigrate to the Mughal court, where they pioneered the rise of Indian-style poetry (Sabk-i Hindi), known for its high-rhetorical texts of metaphors, mystical-philosophical themes and allegories.

=== Architecture ===
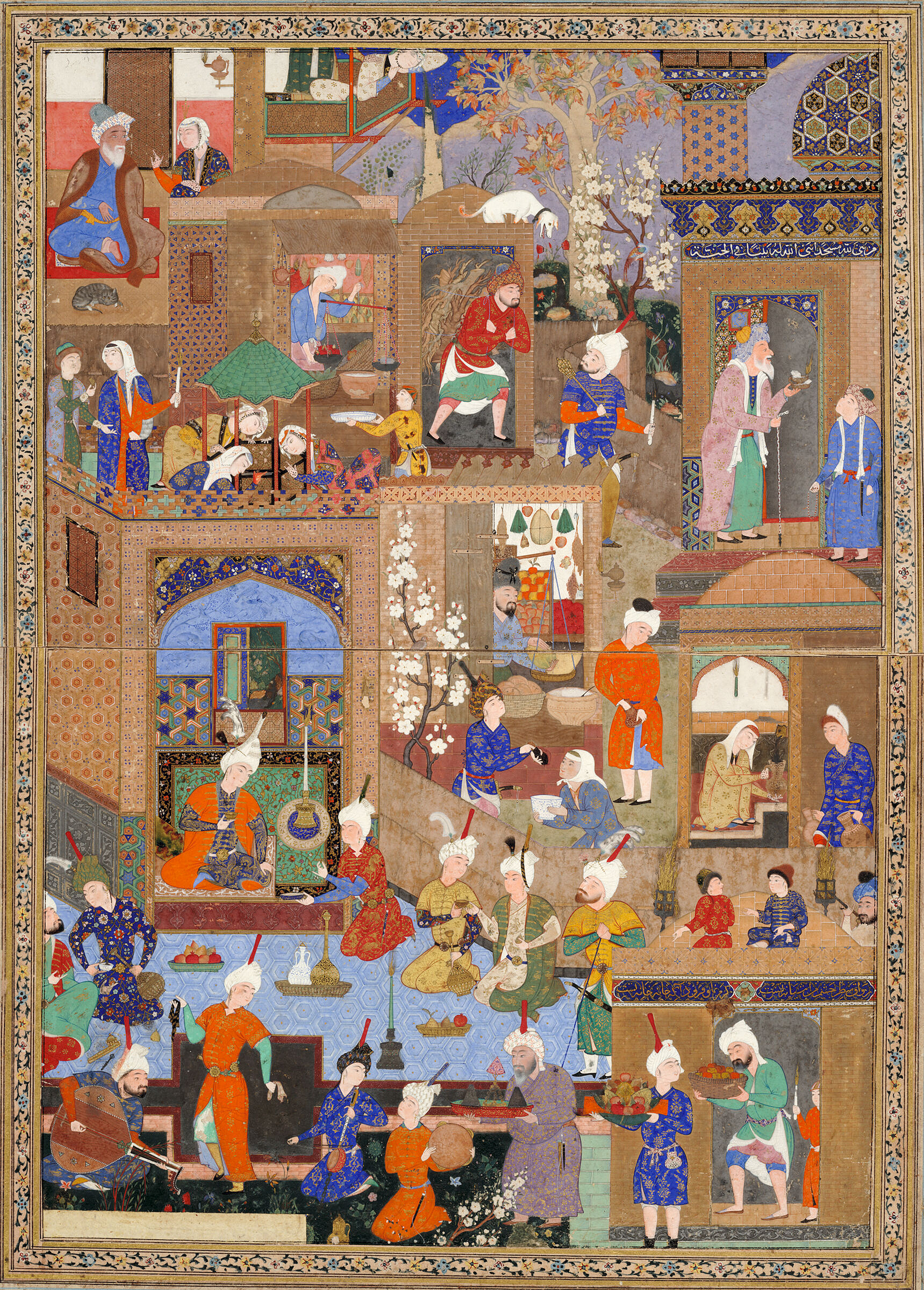
Nighttime in a City: Safavid court and urban environment of the capital of Tabriz, painted circa 1540 by Mir Sayyid Ali for Shah Tahmasp (Sackler Museum, 1958.76).

Like his father, Shah Tahmasp at the beginning of his reign (1524–1555) stayed rather inactive in architectural matters, contenting himself with restorations and embellishments, always along the lines of the dynasties which preceded him. In Tabriz, his capital until the transfer to Qazvin in 1555, Shah Tahmasp had inherited and continued to occupy the Aq Qoyunlu Hasht Behesht Palace. The Palace appears in the early Safavid painting Nighttime in a City, dated circa 1540 from Tabriz, with the ruler sitting in its center holding court.

In terms of renovations, the great mosques of Kerman, Shiraz and Isfahan, and the sanctuaries of Mashhad and Ardabil benefited from his attention. In Ardabil, one can cite the funeral tower of Shah Ismail, which was commissioned by Shah Ismail's wife Tajlu Khanum in 1524, at the beginning of Shah Tahmasp's reign. But during the whole of the 16th century, no new congregational mosques were built in Persia, despite their centuries-old role in the affirmation of Imperial power, possibly out of religious misgivings due to theological disputes about the religious acceptability of Friday prayers in the absence of the Mahdi, or because of the general instability of the Safavid realm during this period.

In Ardabil, the Jannatsarā is one of the rare instances of architectural contribution by Shah Tahmasp. Situated at the north-west of the Safavid tombs in the Sheikh Safi al-Din Khānegāh and Shrine Ensemble, it dates to the years 1536–1540. Its main use is still debated, but it seems to have been designed as an assembly and prayer hall for the ecstatic ceremonies of Sufi followers. Some remarkable carpets, the Ardabil Carpets, were likely created to adorn the building.

The usage of tents remained central for the accommodation of Safavid princes. Shah Tahmasp maintained a royal encampment in Tabriz, which was witnessed by the Venetian traveler Michele Membre. The royal camp amounted to about 5,000 tents used to house the king with his retinue and troops. This indicates a duality in the life style of Safavid rulers, not unlike many of their nomadic predecessors, alternating life between temporary settlements such as tents, and permanent buildings.

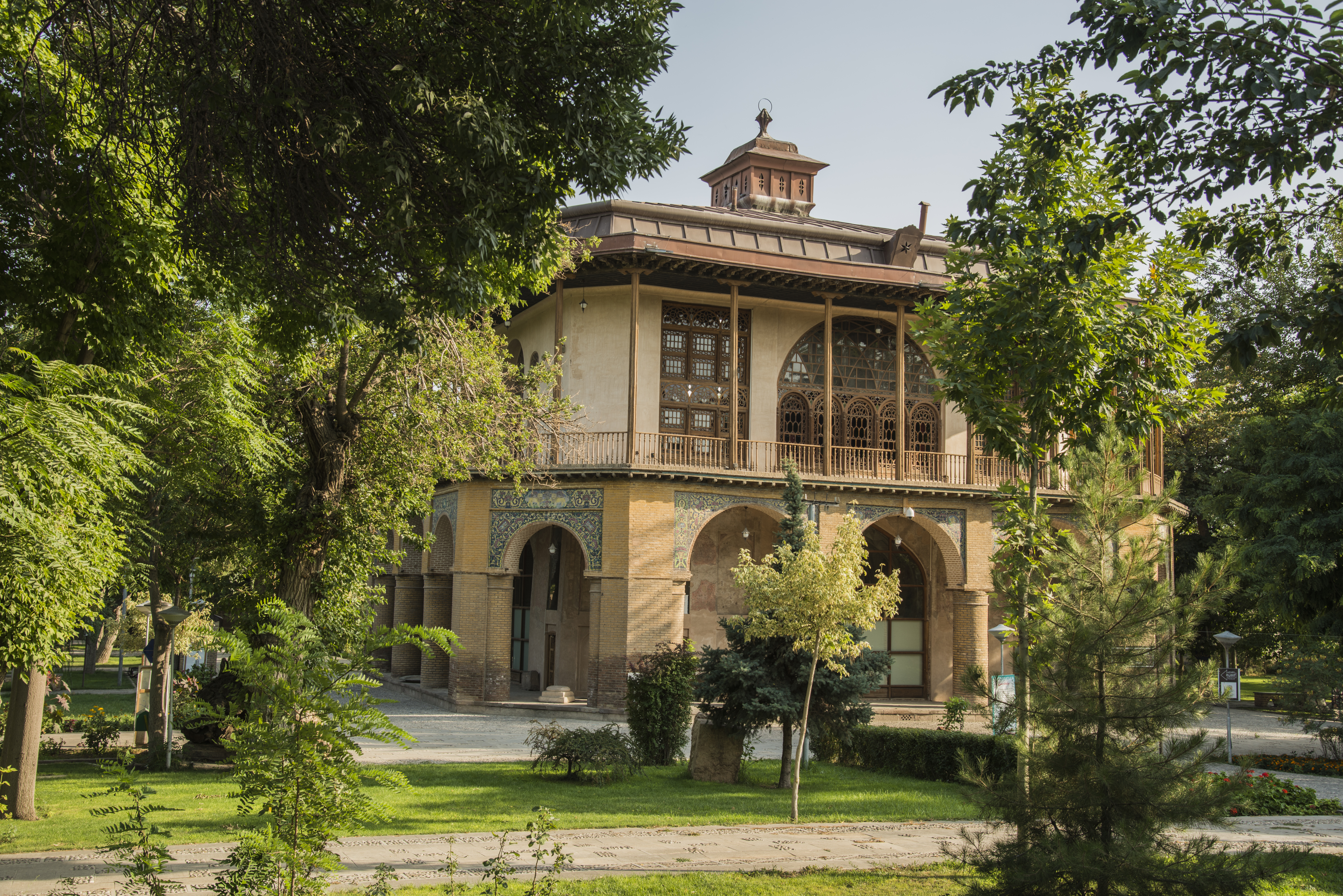
The Chehel Sutun in Qazvin is attributed to Shah Tahmasp

In the second half of his reign circa 1555-56, Shah Tahmasp moved his capital from Tabriz to Qazvin, away from the constant threat of the Ottoman Empire. Tahmasp organized the gardens of Sadatabad in Qazvin, his new capital. These, like all Persian gardens, were divided in four by two perpendicular alleys and bordered by a canal, an arrangement found particularly in the tapis-jardins (literally carpet gardens) of the same period. It contains baths, four covered walkways and three pleasure pavilions: the Gombad-e Muhabbat, the Iwan-e Bagh and the Chehel Sutun. The name of the latter, built in 1556, means "palace of forty columns", a name which is explained by the presence of twenty columns reflected in a pond. In the Persian tradition, the number forty is often used to mean a large quantity. This little construction at one point served as a place of audience, for banquets and for more private uses. It was decorated with panels painted with literary Persian scenes, such as the story of Farhad and Shirin, as well as hunting scenes, festivals and polo, etc. Floral bands surrounded these panels, based on models of Shah Tahmasp himself, to paint at his hours, or again of Muzaffar Ali or Muhammadi, thus used in the royal library.

In the city of Nain, the house of the governor, designed with four iwans, presents a décor undoubtedly elaborated between 1565 and 1575, using a rare and very sophisticated technique: over a coat of red paint, the artist placed a white coating, and then scratched to allow motifs to appear in red silhouette—motifs reminiscent of those in books and on cloth. One finds there animal fights, enthroned princes, literary scenes (Khosrow and Shirin, Yusuf and Zuleykha), a game of polo, hunting scenes etc. One notices that the silhouettes curve and that the taj, the headdress characteristic of the Safavids at the beginning of the empire had disappeared, following the fashion of the time. Among the scroll patterns are calligraphic representations of the quatrains of the poet Hafiz.

=== Ceramics ===
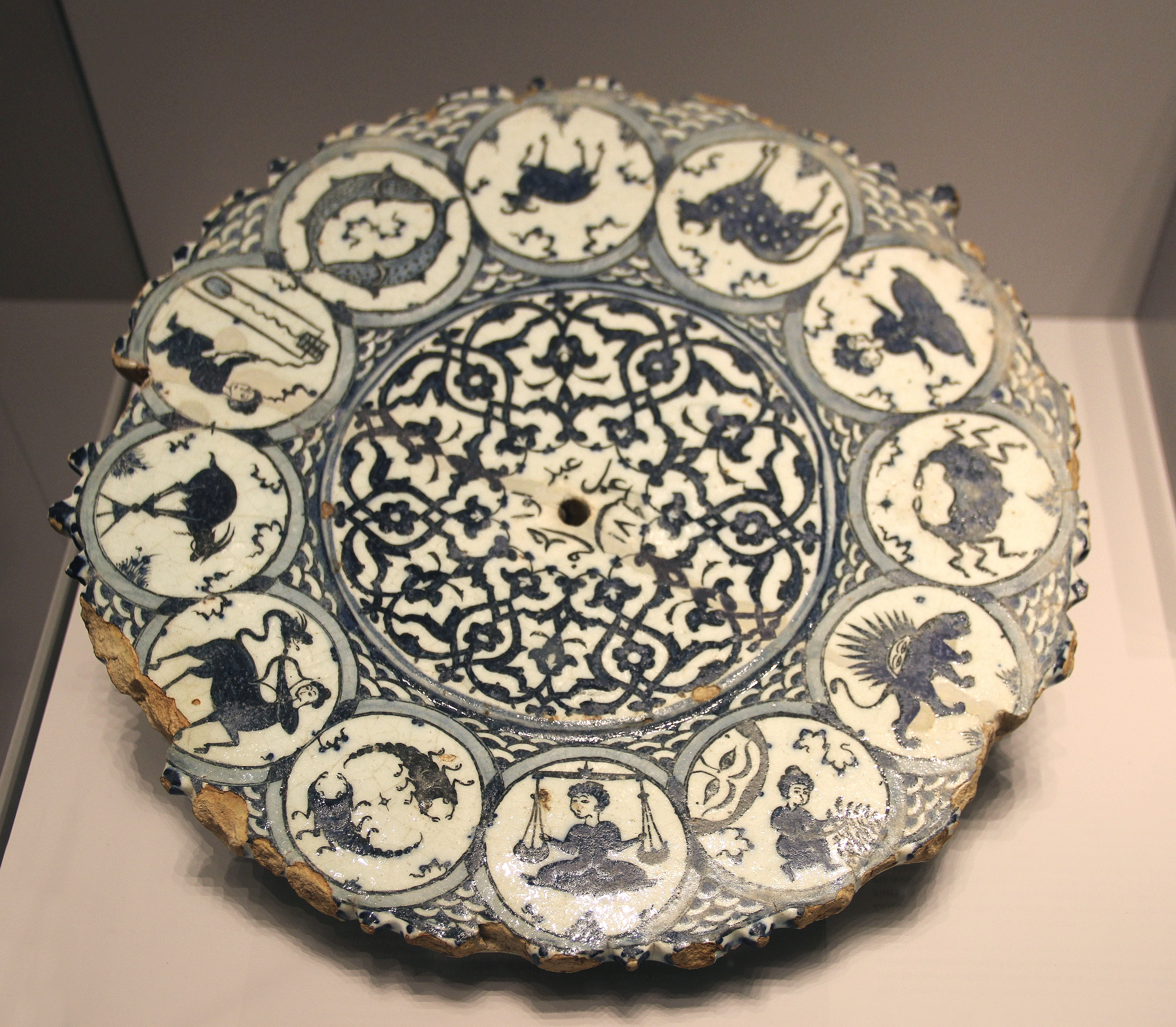
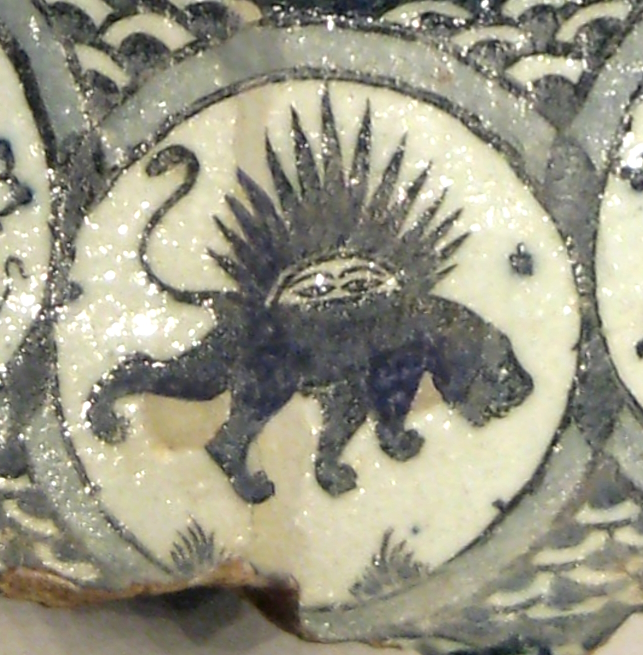
Zodiacal plate containing the astrological lion and sun symbol, 1563, probably Qazvin, Iran. Pergamon Museum in Berlin, Germany.

Only few decorated ceramics can be securely dated to the 16th century. One of them is a blue and black underglaze painted dish dated 1563, and signed by a potter named 'Abd al-Vahed, now in the Islamic Museum, East Berlin. The plate is decorated with an arabesque mesh at its center, and a number of roundels on the periphery, showing the signs of the zodiac. Iranian ceramics from the period often reflect the influence of Chinese wares from Jingdezhen, particularly Ming style blue-and-white dishes.

Mahinbanu Soltanum had a renowned collection of Chinese porcelain, which she donated to the Imam Reza shrine at Mashhad in 1561.

=== Coinage policy ===
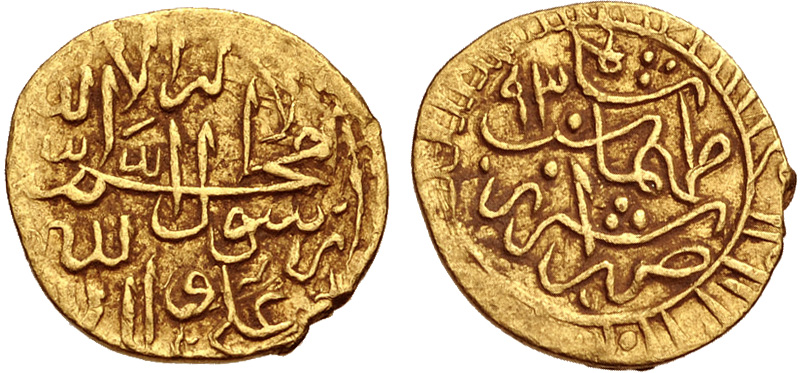
Gold coin of Tahmasp I, minted in Shiraz, dated 1523/24

Tahmasp I's coins were characterised by the region they were minted in. The akçe was used in Shirvan; in Mazandaran, tanka was minted, and Khuzestan used the larin currency. By the 1570s, most of these autonomous monetary were unified. The weight of the shahi (Note: Shahi was the name of the Safavid silver coins, initially weighting 4.6 grams (0.16 oz) during the reign of Ismail I.) coins decreased significantly from 7.88 grams (0.278 oz) at the beginning of Tahmasp's reign to 2.39 grams (0.084 oz) in the western parts of the realm and 2.92 grams (0.103 oz) in the east at the end. These weight reductions were the results of Ottoman and Uzbek invasions as well as the Ottoman trade ban which had a devastating impact on trade, and thus on the shah's revenues. According the Venetian Michel Membré, no merchant could have travelled to Iran through Ottoman borders without permission from the sultan. All travellers were stopped and arrested if they had no royal permit.

In his coins, Arabic is no longer the only language used, in his fals (folus-i shahi) coins, the phrase "May be eternally [condemned] to the damnation of God / He, who alters [the rate of] the royal folus" is minted in Persian. Old copper coins were released anew with the countermarks folus-i shahi, 'adl-e shahi, etc. that showed their new value.

== Family ==
Ancestors of Tahmasp I

8. Shaykh Junayd
4. Shaykh Haydar
9. Khadija Begum bt. Qara Othman
2. Ismail I
10. Uzun Hasan (= 28)
5. Alemshah Halime Begum
11. Despina Khatun
1. Tahmasp I
12. Hamza Beg Mawsillu
6. Mihmad beg Mawsillu
3. Tajlu Khanum
14. Ya'qub Beg
7. An Aq Qoyunlu princess

Tahmasp, unlike his ancestors who married Turkomans, also took Georgians and Circassians as wives; most of his children had Caucasian mothers. His only Turkoman consort was his chief wife, Sultanum Begum of the Mawsillu tribe (a marriage of state), who gave birth to two sons: Mohammad Khodabanda and Ismail II, who succeeded Tahmasp on the throne. Tahmasp had a poor relationship with Ismail, whom he imprisoned on suspicion that his son might attempt a coup against him. However, he was attentive to his other children; On his orders, his daughters were instructed in administration, art, and scholarship, and Haydar Mirza (his favourite son, born of a Georgian slave) participated in state affairs.

Tahmasp had seven known consorts:

- Sultanum Begum (c. 1516 – 1593 in Qazvin), Tahmasp's chief wife, an Aq Qoyunlu princess from the Mawsillu tribe, mother of his two older sons
- Sultan-Agha Khanum, a Kumyk, sister of Shamkhal Sultan Cherkes (governor of Sakki), mother of Pari Khan Khanum and Suleiman Mirza
- Sultanzada Khanum, a Georgian slave, mother of Haydar Mirza
- Zahra Baji, a Georgian, mother of Mustafa Mirza and Ali Mirza
- Huri Khan Khanum, a Georgian, mother of Zeynab Begum and Maryam Begum
- A sister of Waraza Shalikashvili
- Zaynab Sultan Khanum (m. 1549; died in Qazvin October 1570 and buried in Mashhad), widow of Tahmasp's younger brother Bahram Mirza

He had thirteen sons:

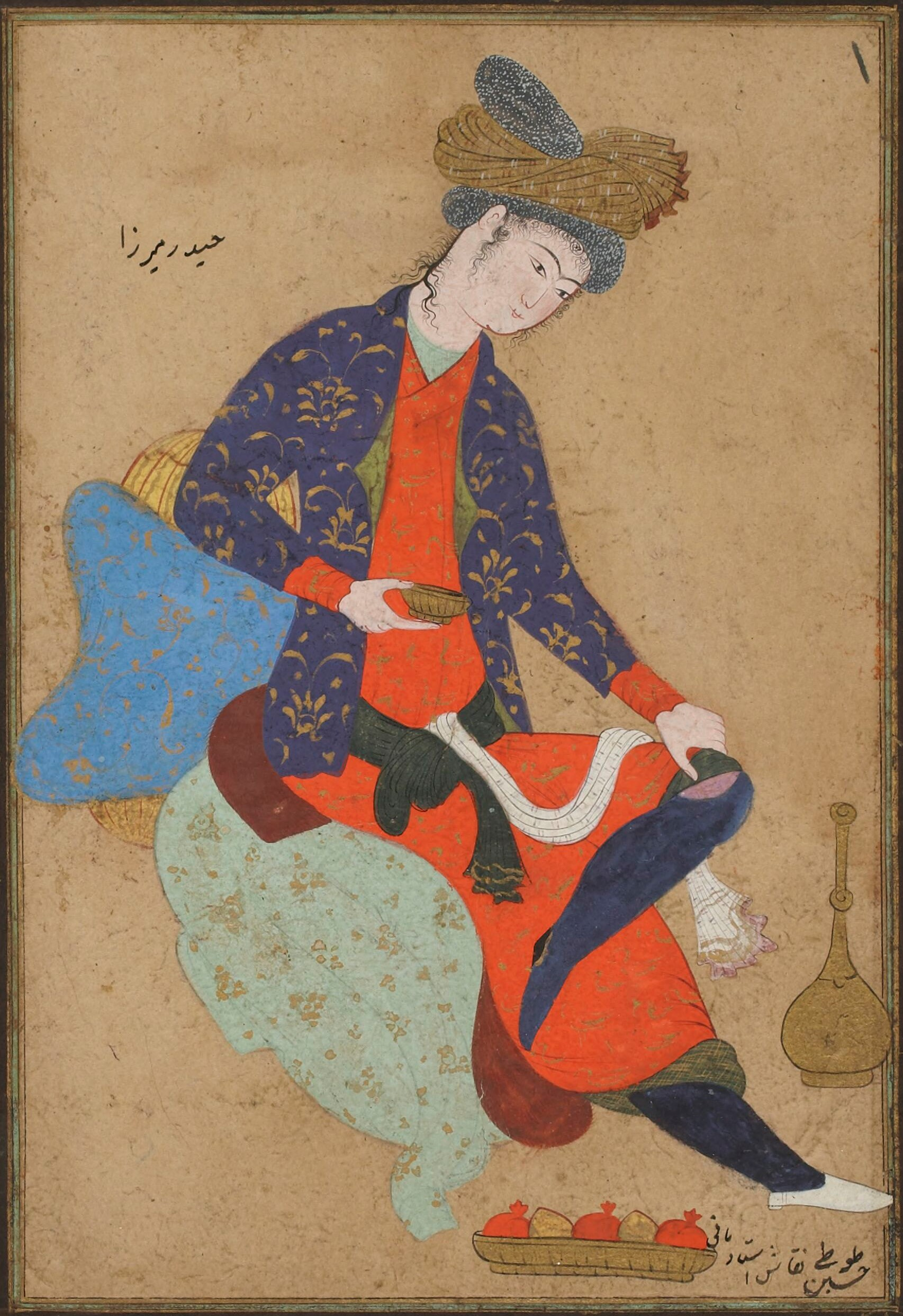
Haydar Mirza, a son of Shah Tahmasp. Painting by Hossein Tooti, dated 16th century

- Mohammad Khodabanda (1532 – 1595 or 1596), Shah of Iran (r. 1578–1587)
- Ismail II (31 May 1537 – 24 November 1577), Shah of Iran (r. 1576–77)
- Murad Mirza (d. 1545), nominal governor of Kandahar; died in infancy
- Suleiman Mirza (d. 9 November 1576), Governor of Shiraz, killed during Ismail II's purge
- Haydar Mirza (28 September 1556 – 15 May 1576), self-proclaimed Shah of Iran for a day after Tahmasp's death; killed by his guards in Qazvin
- Mustafa Mirza, (d. 9 November 1576), killed during Ismail II's purge; his daughter married Abbas the Great
- Junayd Mirza (d. 1577), killed during Ismail II's purge
- Mahmud Mirza (d. 7 March 1577), governor of Shirvan and Lahijan, killed during Ismail II's purge
- Imam Qoli Mirza (died 7 March 1577), killed during Ismail II's purge
- Ali Mirza (d. 31 January 1642), blinded and imprisoned by Abbas the Great
- Ahmad Mirza (died 7 March 1577), killed during Ismail II's purge
- Murad Mirza (d. 1577), killed during Ismail II's purge
- Zayn al-Abedin Mirza, died in childhood
- Musa Mirza, died in childhood

Tahmasp probably had thirteen daughters, eight of whom are known:

- Gawhar Sultan Begum (d. 1577), married Sultan Ibrahim Mirza
- Pari Khan Khanum (d. 1578), died by the orders of Khayr al-Nisa Begum
- Zeynab Begum (d. 31 May 1640), married Ali-Qoli Khan Shamlu
- Maryam Begum (d. 1608), married Khan Ahmad Khan
- Shahrbanu Khanum, married Salman Khan Ustajlu
- Khadija Begum (d. after 1564), married Jamshid Khan (grandson of Amira Dabbaj, a local ruler in western Gilan)
- Fatima Sultan Khanum (d. 1581), married Amir Khan Mawsillu
- Khanish Begum, married Shah Nimtullah Amir Nizam al-Din Abd al-Baqi (leader of the Ni'matullāhī order)

== Legacy ==
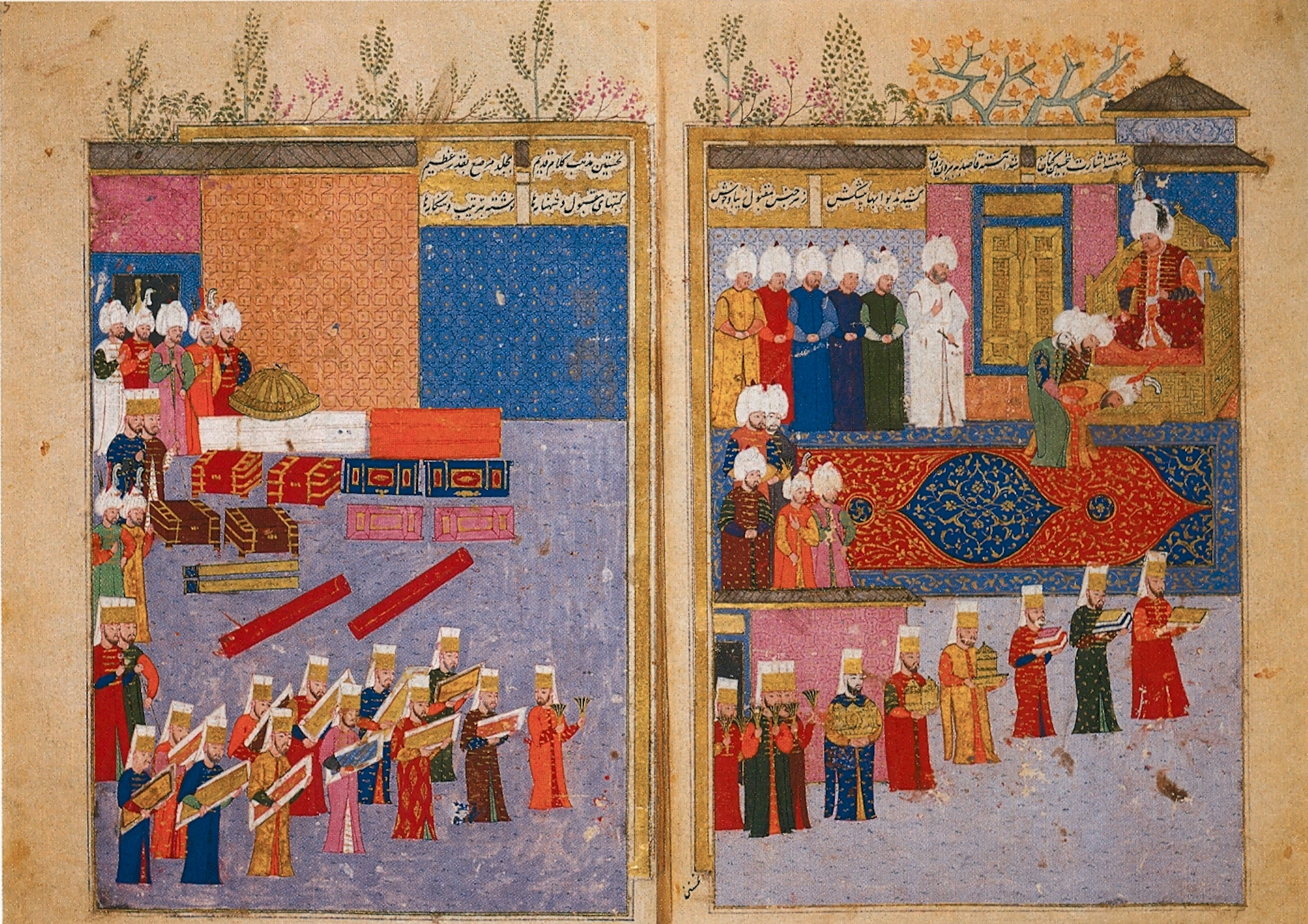
"Presentation of Gifts by the Safavid Ambassador, Shahquili, to Sultan Selim II at Edirne in 1568", including the gift of the Shahnameh of Shah Tahmasp. Şehname-I Selim Han, 1581.

Tahmasp I's reign started in an era of civil wars between the Qizilbash leaders after the death of Ismail I, whose charismatic characterisation as Messiah, which had driven the Qizilbash to follow him, came to an end with Tahmasp's succession. In contrast to his father, Tahmasp did not possess charisma in any political or spiritual sense, nor was he old enough to prove himself a fierce warrior on the battlefield, a quality valued by the Qizilbash. Eventually, Tahmasp did overcome that challenge; he proved himself a worthy military commander in the Battle of Jam against the Uzbeks and, instead of facing the Ottomans directly in the battlefield, he preferred to loot their rearguards. Even the ability to survive against the much larger Ottoman army marks him as a master of Fabian tactics. Tahmasp knew that he could not replace his father as a charismatic spiritual leader, and while he struggled to restore his family's legitimacy amongst the Qizilbash, he also had to craft a public figure of himself to convince the wider population of his right to rule as the new Safavid shah. Thus, he became a devout follower of Shi'ism and maintained this image with exaggerated piety until the end of his reign. This zealous image helped him to break the influence of the Qizilbash, and he became able to take the reins of power within ten years, after the realm had been through the civil war between the plotting tribal chieftains. He thus established a standard public image for Safavid kings: a zealous monarch who functioned as a representative of the Hidden Imam. However, none of his successors kept this image as zealously as him. Even after consolidating his power, Tahmasp had little political leverage compared to the Ottoman Empire. However, he successfully laid the foundation for Abbas the Great's transformation of the Safavid polity by bringing Caucasian slaves into his realm. He thus created the core of the force that changed the political balance of the empire in his grandson's time.

=== European perception ===
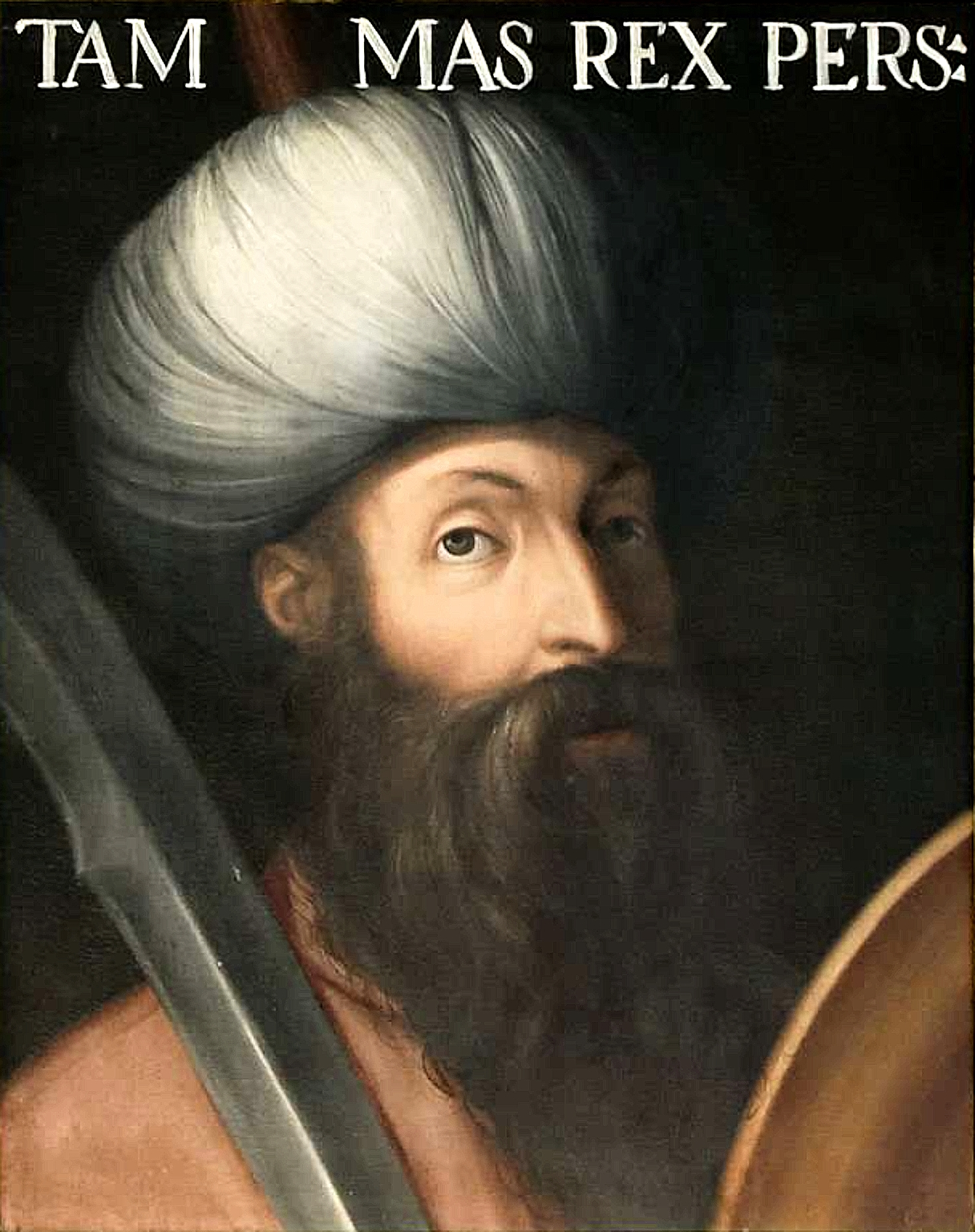
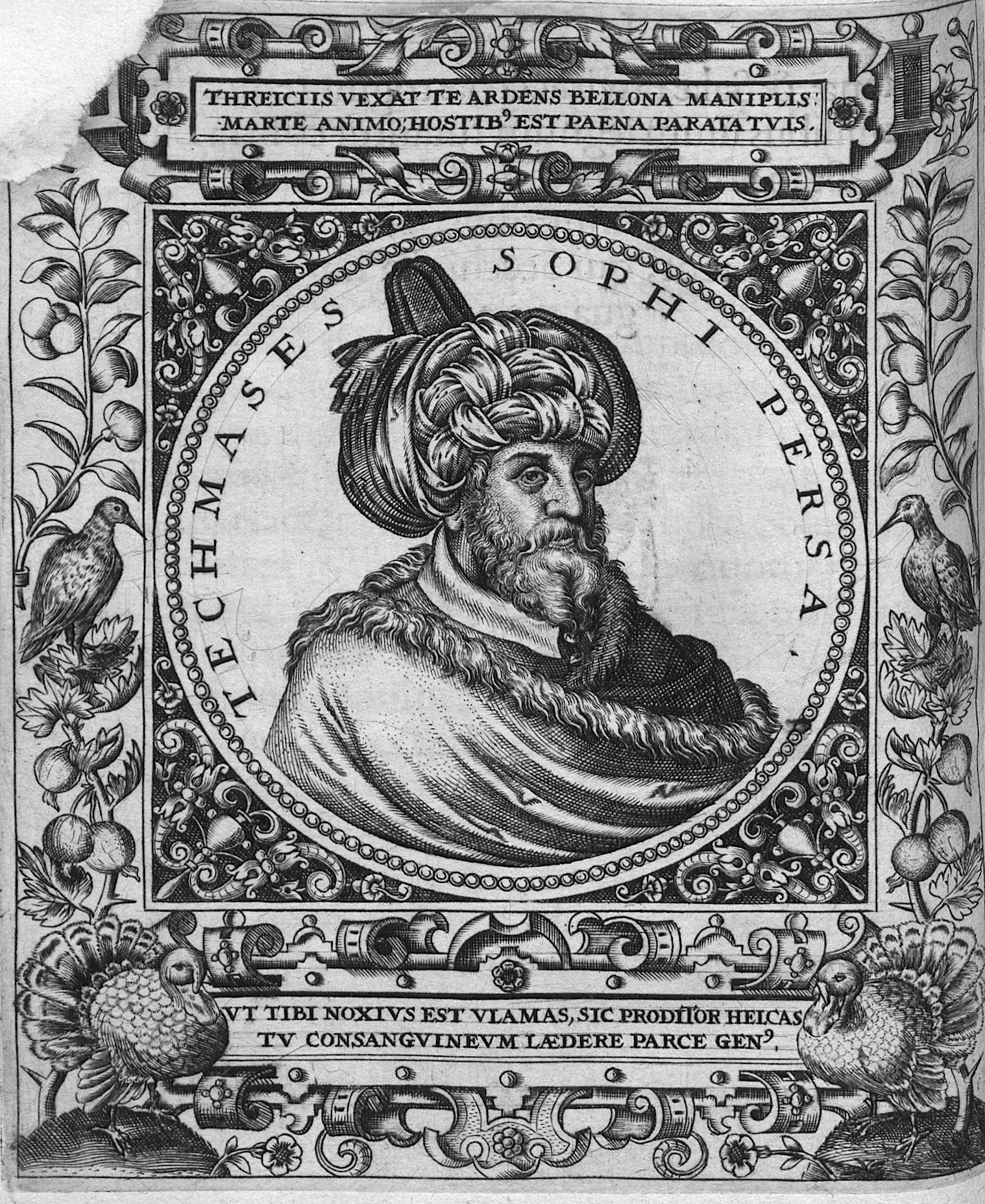
European imaginary depictions of Shah Tahmasp: painting by Cristofano dell'Altissimo (1552–1568), and engraving by Georg Greblinger (circa 1590)

Tahmasp I made little impression on Western historians, who often compared him with his father. He is portrayed as a "miser" and a "religious bigot". He was accused of never leaving the harem and it was said that he divided his time between sexual liaisons with his favourites and foretelling the future. This characterisation has made an obscure figure out of Tahmasp as a king and a person. However, there are several instances recorded by the contemporary historians which denoted the more favourable sides of the shah's character: the fact that, despite his greed, piety led him to forgo taxes of about 30,000 tomans because collecting them would offend the religious law; his speech to the envoys of Suleiman the Magnificent, who had come to collect the fugitive Şehzade Bayezid, showed his political skill; (Note: The text of the speech: "Several times I have had envoys to His Majesty the Great Lord (Suleiman) sent and had some messages delivered; but so great were pride and hardness in the heart of His Majesty the Great Lord, that he had never thought of despatching envoys himself. During the whole time since the death of His Majesty the Khagan (Ismail I) up to the present day during these thirty-nine years, I have always harboured the wish that someone on behalf of His Majesty the Great Lord would come, so that I could explain these matters to him. Thanks to the Allah that now you, two men of such repute, (one of which was Gazi Hüsrev Pasha, the Grand vizier) with your entourage of two hundred squires and three hundred servants of your own, have come to me and can hear this tale. You will then report all this to His Majesty the Great Lord, or if not yourself, then at least one of your people; and if you cannot tell His Majesty the Great Lord about it, speak to his pashas and courtiers, so that His Majesty the Great Lord may hear of it.") he patronised the arts and had a highly cultured mind.

According to Colin P. Mitchell, it is an achievement that he was able to not only maintain his father's empire from dissolution but also expanded it whilst being contemporaneous with Suleiman the Magnificent, the most successful Ottoman sultan. It was during Tahmasp's reign that the Safavid right to rule was established and gradually accepted among the Shia people, who were endeared to the idea of a descendent of Ahl al-Bayt (Family of the prophet of Islam, Muhammad) ruling over them. Thus the Safavid dynasty gained an ideological underpinning much stronger than the initial premise of the right of conquest. By the end of his reign, Tahmasp's success in keeping the empire together allowed the Persian elite of the bureaucracy to assume bureaucratic and ideological custodianship of the Safavid empire. This allowed Tahmasp and his successors to gain dynastic legitimacy and to cultivate an imperial cult of personality that prevented another civil war, even when the empire was at its most fragile position.

== Notes ==
Tahmasp I Safavid dynasty Born: 22 February 1514 Died: 25 May 1576
Iranian royalty
Preceded by Ismail I	Shah of Iran; 1524–1576	Succeeded by Ismail II
