= Ismail II =

Safavid Shah of Iran from 1576 to 1577

Ismail II اسماعیل دوم
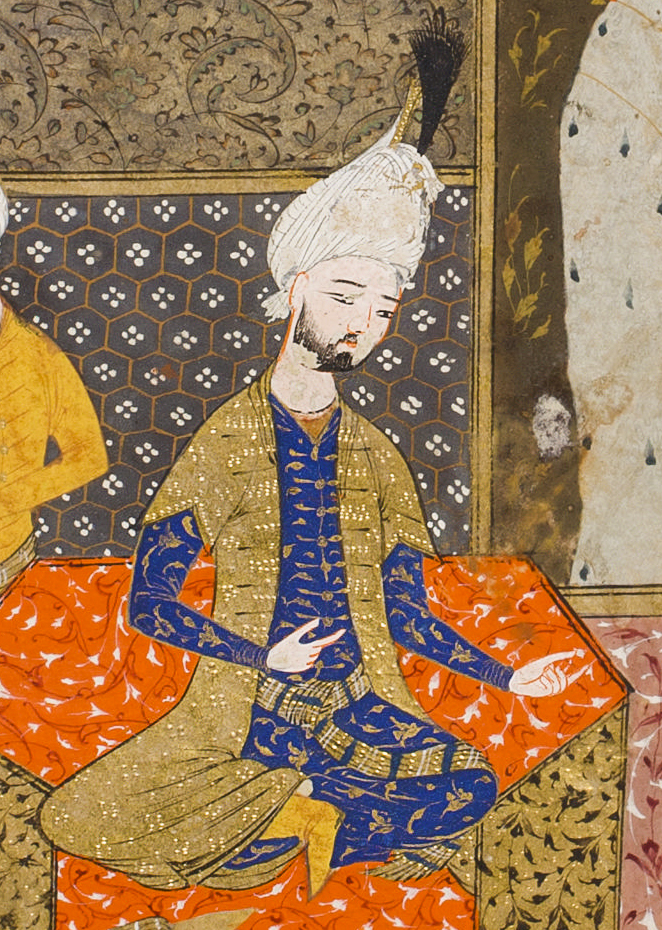
- Shah Ismail II from a 17th century chronicle of Safavid history, Kholāsat al-tavārikh

Shah of Iran
- Reign: 22 August 1576 – 24 November 1577
- Predecessor: Tahmasp I
- Successor: Mohammad Khodabanda
- Born: 31 May 1537; Qom, Safavid Iran
- Died: 24 November 1577 (aged 40); Qazvin, Safavid Iran
- Burial: Imamzadeh Hossein, Qazvin
Names
- Ismail Mirza
- Dynasty: Safavid
- Father: Tahmasp I
- Mother: Sultanum Begum
- Religion: Sunni Islam

Ismail II (Persian: اسماعیل دوم; born Ismail Mirza; 31 May 1537 – 24 November 1577) was the third shah of Safavid Iran from 1576 to 1577. He was the second son of Tahmasp I with his principal consort, Sultanum Begum of the Mawsillu clan of the Aq Qoyunlu confederation. On the orders of Tahmasp, Ismail spent twenty years imprisoned in Qahqaheh Castle; whether for his recurrent conflicts with the realm's influential vassals, or for his growing popularity with the Qizilbash tribes, resulting in Tahmasp becoming wary of his son's influence.

Tahmasp died In 1576 without a designated heir. Ismail, with the support of his sister, Pari Khan Khanum, overcame his opponents and usurped the crown. In order to relieve himself of potential claimants, Ismail purged all the male members of the royal family, except for his full-brother, Mohammad Khodabanda and his three sons. In fear of the Qizilbash influence on the administration and the army, Ismail replaced them with people whom he trusted. Ismail belittled the Shi'ia Islam scholars and sought spiritual guidance from the Sunni Islam ulama. This was perhaps out of spite for his father, who was a devoted Shi'ia.

Towards the end of his reign, Ismail shunned Pari Khan, and had her arrested, despite her efforts to make him king. On 24 November 1577, Ismail unexpectedly died from unknown reasons, but the general view was that he was poisoned by either Pari Khan Khanum or the Qizilbash leaders. He was succeeded by his brother, the blind Mohammad Khodabanda. Contemporary historians considered Ismail as an irrational, perverted, and inept ruler, who brought the Safavid dynasty to the brink of collapse. However, a number of contemporary chroniclers also portray him as a just king. Some modern historians regard his policies as disastrous and his personality as unusually ruthless, even by the period's standards.

== Early life ==
Ismail Mirza was born on the night of Thursday 31 May 1537 in Qom as the second son of Tahmasp I with his principal consort, Sultanum Begum of the Mawsillu clan of the Aq Qoyunlu confederation. She was the sister of Musa Sultan, the governor of Tabriz, who is sometimes confused with Sultanum's father, Isa Khan, who was Tahmasp's maternal uncle. Ismail spent his childhood in the court and since his older brother and the heir apparent, Mohammad Khodabanda was appointed as the governor of Herat, the young Ismail was the only child in the royal palace of Qazvin; thus, he had all his father's attention. Tahmasp loved and admired the young Ismail for his courage. As a child, Ismail learned riding and archery, as well as reading and writing.

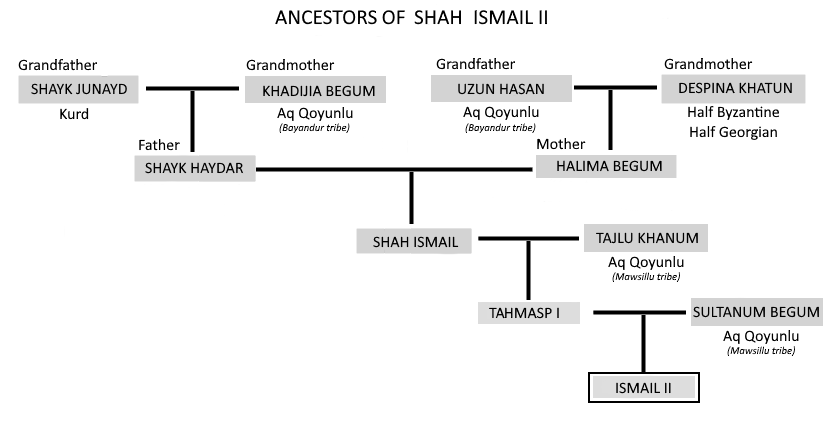
Ancestors of Shah Ismail II.

In the late summer of 1547, Ismail was appointed as the governor of Shirvan after the shah's brother and the previous governor, Alqas Mirza, fled to the Ottoman Empire after a failed rebellion. There, Ismail faced a rebellion by a claimant to the Shirvanshah's throne and Tahmasp's nephew, Burhan Ali, son of Khalilullah II; he was evidently supported by the Ottoman Empire. He was defeated by an army under the command of Ismail's lala (guardian), Gokcha Sultan Ziadlu Qajar. In 1547, during the Ottoman–Safavid War, Ismail Mirza led the local Shirvani warriors into a great victory against the overnumbered Ottoman troops in the Eastern Anatolia. On 25 August 1548, Ismail led the ransack of Kars, killing civilians who had fled the chaos and disorder after the joint campaign of Alqas Mirza and the Ottonans. There, he faced an attempt to his life by the governor of the city. In retaliation, he ordered the massacre of the Ottoman prisoners and the razing of the Kars fortress. After a period of peace, in the winter of 1552, Ismail with 8000 men raided Erzurum and destroyed the Ottoman fortification near the city. The Ottoman commander and the governor of Erzurum, Iskandar Pasha, decided to fight Ismail's army before they reached the city. The battle ended in a stalemate, with Ismail retreating into the west and seemingly defeated. Iskandar Pasha followed Ismail and then was faced with a new Safavid army and was defeated with heavy casualties.

The victory in Erzurum brought Ismail fame and popularity among the Qizilbash but also started the third phase of the war with the Ottoman Empire and the Peace of Amasya, in which the Safavid lands in Mesopotamia were lost to the Ottomans. Even then, Ismail remained in Qizilbash's memory as a renowned military figure, who at a young age, successfully led skirmishes against the Ottomans.

== Before enthronement ==
=== Governor of Herat ===
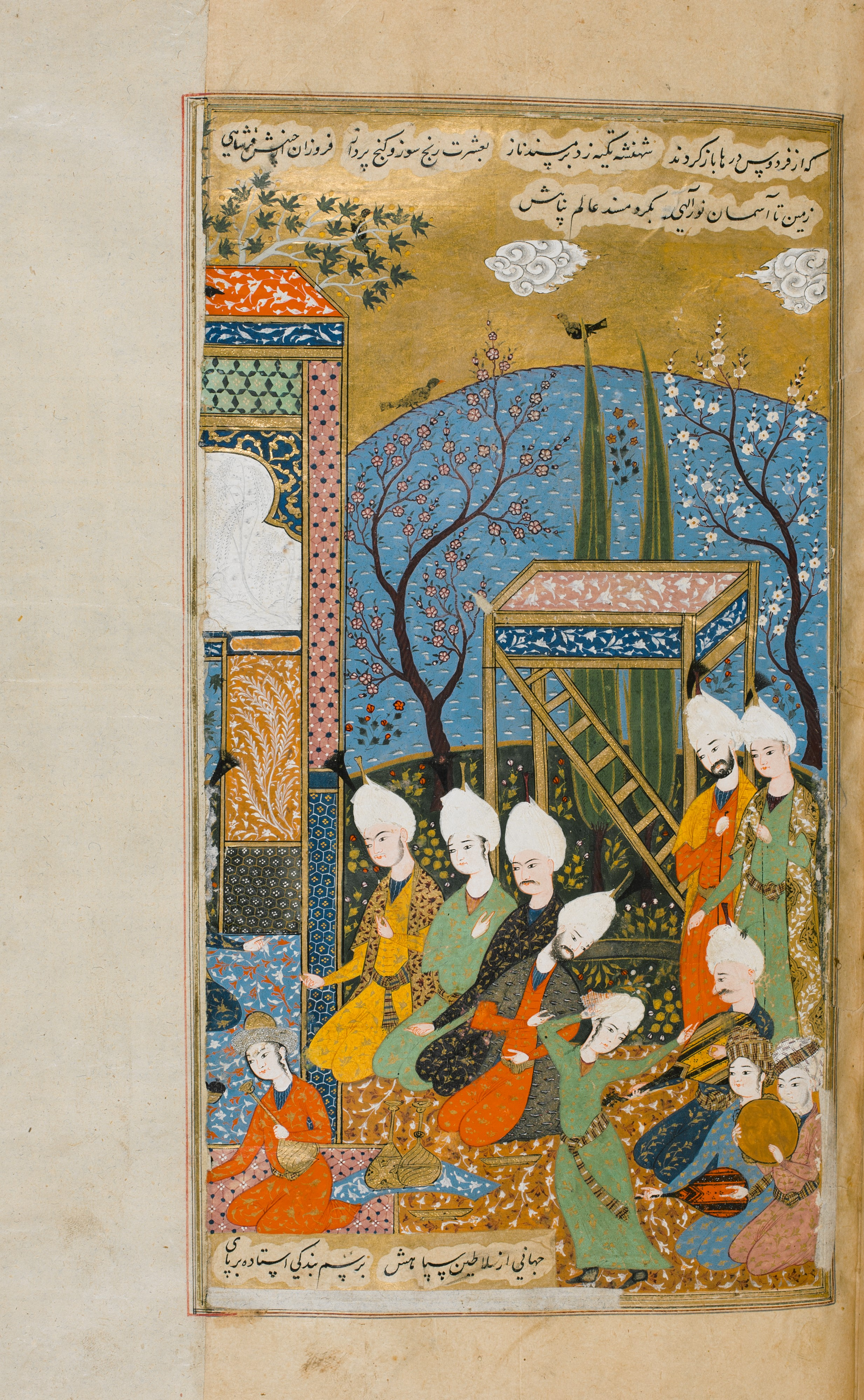
Celebrations in Tabriz for the marriage of Ismail Mirza, folio from Kholāsat al-tavārikh by Ahmad Monshi Ghomi

In the autumn of 1555, Ismail married his cousin, Safieh Soltan Khanum, the daughter of Khanish Begum (Tahmasp's sister) and Shah Nur-al Din Nimatullah Baqi. The wedding ceremony took place in a mansion in the north of Tabriz. The couple were settled in Qazvin and were given the house previously owned by the shah's brother, Bahram Mirza. A lyrical poem in the same year indicates that Ismail felt pain and agony from his marriage and had lost the comfort of a male companion in Shirvan. From Safieh Soltan, he had a daughter who later married Shah Khalil-Allah Kermani.

In Qazvin, Ismail spent many of his nights with male lovers, and his homosexuality was an open secret. This contrasted with Tahmasp's zealotry; however, he did not try to stop Ismail until the winter of 1555, when it was reported that Ismail had broken a leg during an outing with his male companion. The incident further infuriated Tahmasp with his son, and on 3 April 1556, he sent Ismail to Herat to govern there instead of Mohammad Khodabanda. (Note: Another reason for his ousting was Ismail’s recurrent raids upon Ottoman territory, despite the newly-signed Peace of Amasya.) Ismail entered Herat in June and was greeted by his brother. Mohammad Khan Sharaf al-Din Ogli Takalu was appointed as his lala.

Ismail's short tenure as the governor saw the return of many Sunni scholars who had fled Khorasan to their homeland. His pro-Sunni policies were soon to be exploited by his enemies in Qazvin, who used this to persuade Tahmasp to recall him from Khorasan. However, the main reason for his ousting was Ogli Takalu's bitter feud with his elder son, Zayn-al-Din Ali Sultan, a close companion to Ismail, that prompted Tahmasp to recall his son from Herat in less than two years. Zayn-al-Din was later tortured to death on the account of accompanying Ismail in his sessions with consenting young boys.

=== Imprisonment ===
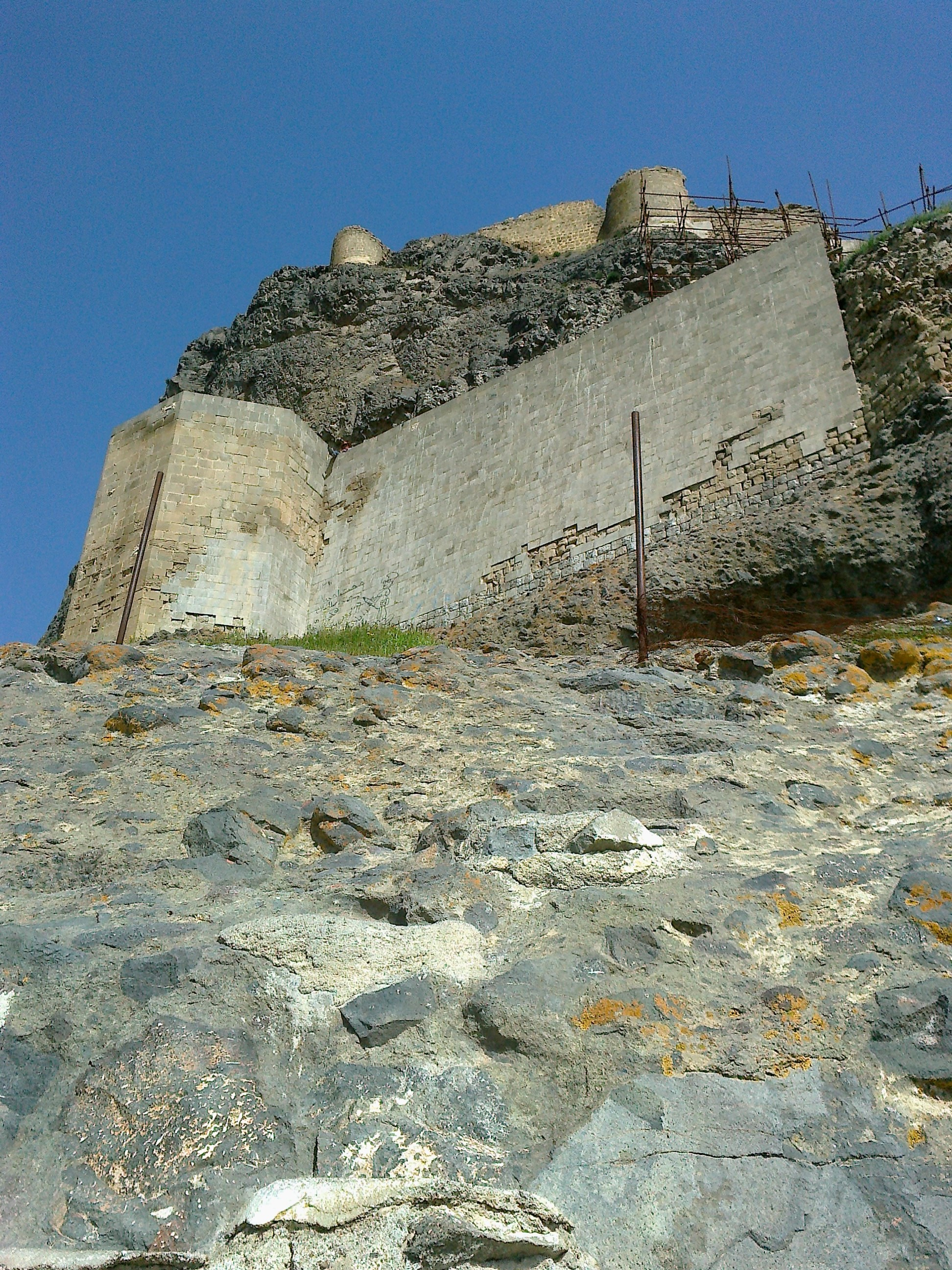
The Qahqaheh Castle, where Ismail was imprisoned for nineteen years

Tahmasp ordered Ismail's allies in the court to be eliminated, including a chief of Bayat tribe and two Zul al-Qadr emirs, while Ismail was on his way to Qazvin. Moreover, Tahmasp also did not allow Ismail to enter Qazvin and instead, ordered his arrest in Saveh. Different reasons are suggested for this act by the shah, mainly based upon Tahmasp's paranoia of Ismail's popularity; Ismail's recurrent attacks on the Ottoman borderlands, and lastly, Tahmasp's outrage on Ismail's homosexuality and addiction to drugs. The shah ordered the imprisonment of Ismail in the Qahqaheh Castle in 1557, where he remained imprisoned for nineteen years. Tahmasp seemed to have been influenced by his grand vizier, Ma'sum Beg Safavi (who was also the lala to Haydar Mirza, his favourite son) to take this decision.

Ismail's gaolers were replaced every two years to prevent them from becoming intimate with Ismail and developing sympathy towards him. Reportedly, during the initial period of his imprisonment, he was kept in shackles, but later he was allowed to walk to the castle's courtyard and return to his jail as he wished. However, in the rubāʿiyāt (quatrains) attributed to Ismail, he laments his incarceration in Qahqaha, ascribing it to his foes’ resentment at his prowess and insight. His addiction to drugs increased greatly during his imprisonment, to the point when he consumed 47 misqal, equivalent to 199.75 grams (7.046 oz) of grain, of barsh, an antidote of opium, which he used while also taking opium. (Note: Barsh was made of bezoar stone, zedary, pepper, saffron, euphorbia, and dracunculus. It was often consumed it the same time with opium and its purpose was to counteract the effect of the drug by causing the person to become addicted to barsh as a replacement.)

While Ismail was in Qahqaha, the Qizilbash leaders confronted Tahmasp with the question of succession, as he did not desire to appoint any of his sons as the crown prince. There was two candidates, one was Haydar Mirza, the shah's favourite son, supported by the Ustajlu tribe, Sheykhavand family (related to Sheikh Safi-ad-din Ardabili, the progenitor of the Safavid dynasty and hence the royal family in large) and the powerful court Georgian gholams (military slaves) and concubines.

The other candidate was Ismail, supported by Pari Khan Khanum, Tahmasp's influential daughter, and the other Qizilbash tribes such as Afshar, Qajar and Rumlu. In 1571, Ismail survived a conspiracy. That year, Haydar Mirza wrote a letter to the castellan of Qahqaha Castle, requesting him to eliminate Ismail. Pari Khan Khanum found out about this plan and informed Tahmasp. The king, who still held affection towards Ismail, ordered Afshar musketeers to guard his jail in case of an assassination attempt.

== Reign ==
=== Familial purge ===
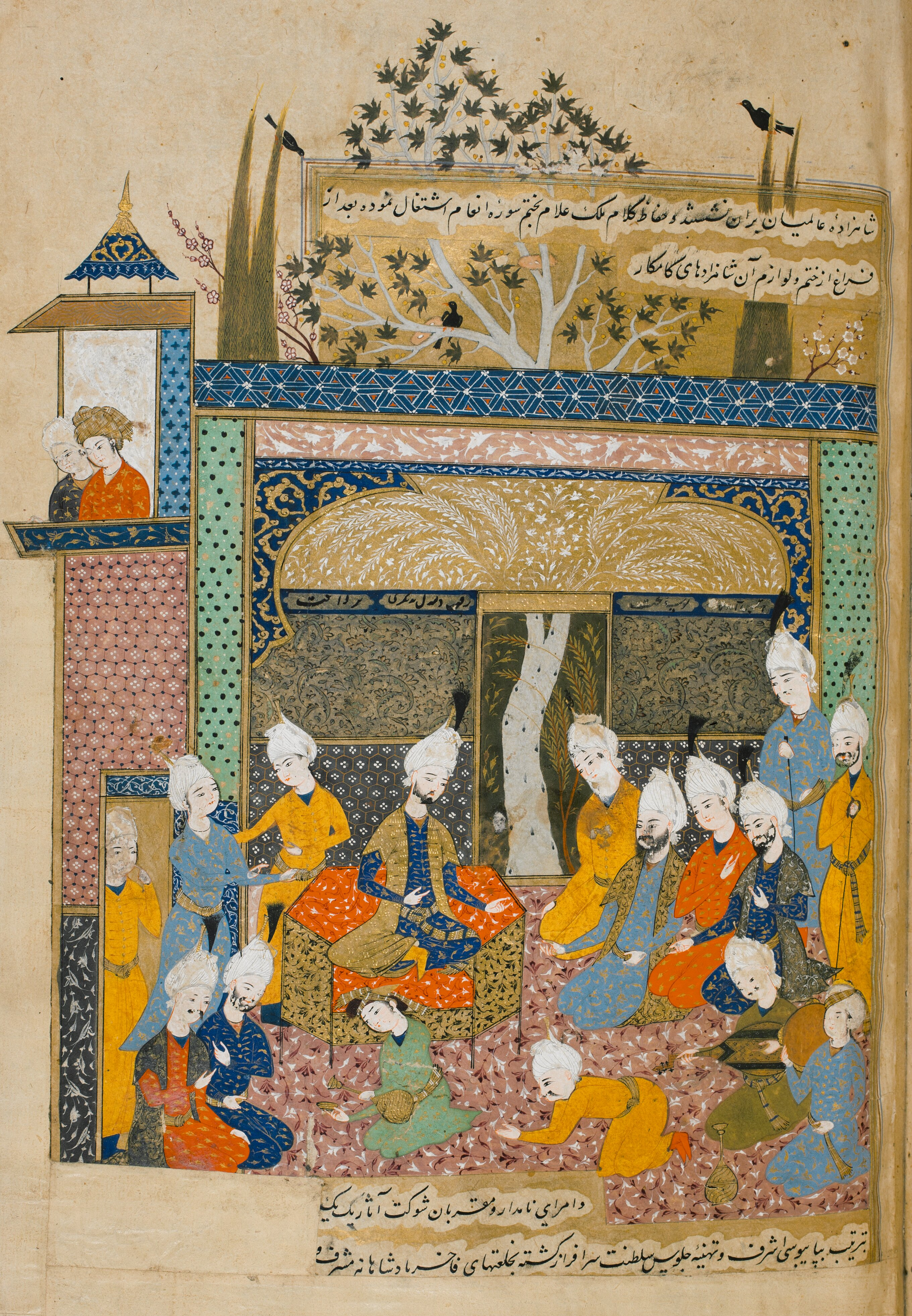
Coronation of Shah Ismail II, folio from Kholassat ot-Tavarikh by Ahmad Monshi Ghomi

Tahmasp I died on 15 May 1576 from accidental poisoning. Immediately, Haydar Mirza proclaimed himself the new king and wore Tahmasp's crown. However, he did not find the time to assert his authority, for on the same day, the qurchis (the loyal bodyguards) who supported Ismail, isolated him from his supporters and killed Haydar Mirza. On 31 May 1576, 30,000 Qizilbash cavalrymen assembled before Qahqaheh Castle, demanding the release of Ismail, who accepted to come out of his jail only after hearing all of them pledge loyalty to him. On 1 September 1576, Ismail entered Qazvin and ascended the throne as Ismail II.

A coronation party was held in the Chehel Sotun palace of Qavin which was attended by his brothers, cousins, court bureaucrats, religious dignitaries, Qizilbash tribal and military chiefs and the Georgian Bagrationi princes. Ambassadorial missions and gifts from the Ottoman Empire, the Nizam Shahi sultanate of Deccan, and the Portuguese also arrived for the ceremony. The khutba of the accession was read by Makhdum Sharifi Shirazi, a Sunni clergyman chosen by Pari Khan Khanum, who Ismail later appointed as the sadr-i mamalik (minister of the religion). Moreover, a few days after his coronation, Ismail appointed Mirza Shokrollah Isfahani as his grand vizier, Shahrokh Khan Zul al-Qadr, his former cellmate, as chief military prosecutor or divanbeygi and Mirza Mohammad Ma'muri, a bureaucrat shunned by Tahmasp, as his chief scribe or monshi.

Three months after his enthronement, on a day that Ismail insisted was auspicious, he not only ordered the execution of the pro-Haydar faction members of the court but also showed hostility towards his own supporters. He executed people whose only crime was having a position during Tahmasp's reign, and soon it was clear that Ismail, his mind affected by the long imprisonment, wanted to stay in power at any cost. Hence, the eighteen months of his rule became a reign of terror that was horrific even by the period's standards.

Ismail, no doubt mindful of the earlier threats that Alqas Mirza and Sam Mirza, Tahmasp's brothers, posed as the crown claimants, ordered the purge of his own brothers, who were mercilessly and cruelly killed: in 9 November 1576, Suleiman Mirza was beheaded in Qazvin. Following his death, Ismail's younger brothers and cousins, Mahmud Mirza, Imam Qoli Mirza, and Ahmad Mirza, were all put to death. Two days after their execution, on 5 March 1577, Ismail ordered the death of his cousin, Prince Ibrahim Mirza, the most prominent Safavid Prince and Ismail's chief judge. As a result of his brutality, Prince Soltan Hosayn Mirza raised arms against Ismail in the remote region of Kandahar, but was soon eliminated by Ismail's agents in the city. (Note: According to other sources, Soltan Hosayn Mirza may have committed suicide when he heard of Ismail's agents being sent after him (recorded by Mirza Beg Junabadi) or may have been murdered by his own brother, Badi-al Zaman Mirza (recorded by Afushta'i Natanzi).) His uprising only helped to feed Ismail's paranoia and insanity. According to Makhdum Sharifi Shirazi, in some cases of this mass murder, Ismail was unwilling to kill some of his kin, an example being Badi-al Zaman Mirza, his cousin, who was murdered in Sistan. After a lengthy discussion, Makhdum convinced the shah that his death was necessary. Of all his relatives, only Mohammad Khodabanda, his blind brother, and Mohammad's three infant sons survived this purge.

=== Death ===
After Ismail was reassured of the safety of his position, he took the drastic measure of reversing the imposition of Shi'ism in Iran and reintroducing the Sunnism faith, an act followed by the harassment of the Shi'ia scholars. A reason suggested for this action was Ismail's hatred of his father and his desire to do anything in the opposite of what Tahmasp saw fit, namely the zealous practice of the Shi'ia tradition by Tahmasp. Ismail sought out individuals who could help disassemble the established Shi'ia hegemony, which had emerged under his father. His principal target was Mir Seyyid Hossein Al-Karaki, Sheikh al-Islam of Isfahan, but others such as the militant Shi'ias from Astarabad, the new qazi-i mu'asker and even Makhdum Shirazi were also harassed and put under arrest.

He organised a set of qurchis (loyal bodyguards) to counter those loyal to al-Karaki. Moreover, he also had the khalifa al-khulifa, Bulgar Khalifa, beaten and shamed for not endorsing Ismail's measures, and arrested and executed his son, Nur Ali Khalifa, on 24 February 1577, along with a number of high-profile Qizilbash leaders.

Pari Khan Khanum's status after Ismail's coronation was greatly enhanced; the nobility paid her obeisance, and many prominent courtiers sought her patronage and assistance. Ismail was apparently displeased with the attention that his courtiers gave to his sister and her 'meddling' in the affairs of state. He reportedly asked the nobility, "Have you not understood, my friends, that interference in matters of state by women is demeaning to the king's honour?". Shortly after, he put Pari Khan Khanum under house arrest in her room, and had her guards increased. Her belongings were confiscated, thus making her resentful of her brother. Furthermore, Ismail's pro-Sunni policies and rumours of him being a Sunni himself alarmed the Qizilbash leaders.

On the night of 24 November 1577, Ismail consumed slices of poisoned opium before getting to bed with his male companion, a young boy named Hassan Beg. The next morning, the courtiers found him dead, cradled by the boy. Although at the time his death was regarded as natural, many historians have accused the Qizilbash leaders or Pari Khan Khanum of being responsible for his death. On the morning of Monday 25 November 1577, Ismail's body was buried in the shrine of Imamzadeh Hossein in Qazvin. Soon afterwards, Ismail's infant son by one of his concubines, was murdered. Ismail was succeeded by his blind brother, Mohammad Khodabanda.

== Historiography ==
While there are a number of chronicles praising his sense of justice, most of the contemporary historians, such as Hasan Beg Rumlu (d. 1544) and Iskandar Beg Munshi, often portray Ismail as an irrational, perverted, and inept ruler, who brought the Safavid dynasty to the brink of collapse. The modern historian, Hans Robert Roemer, regards Ismail's policy as disastrous, whereas Colin P. Mitchell describes his administration as assertive and fruitful. The German historian Walther Hinz considers him a ruthless monarch, who was celebrated as a warlord by the Qizilbash, and whose reign was established on bloodshed.

== Coinage policy ==
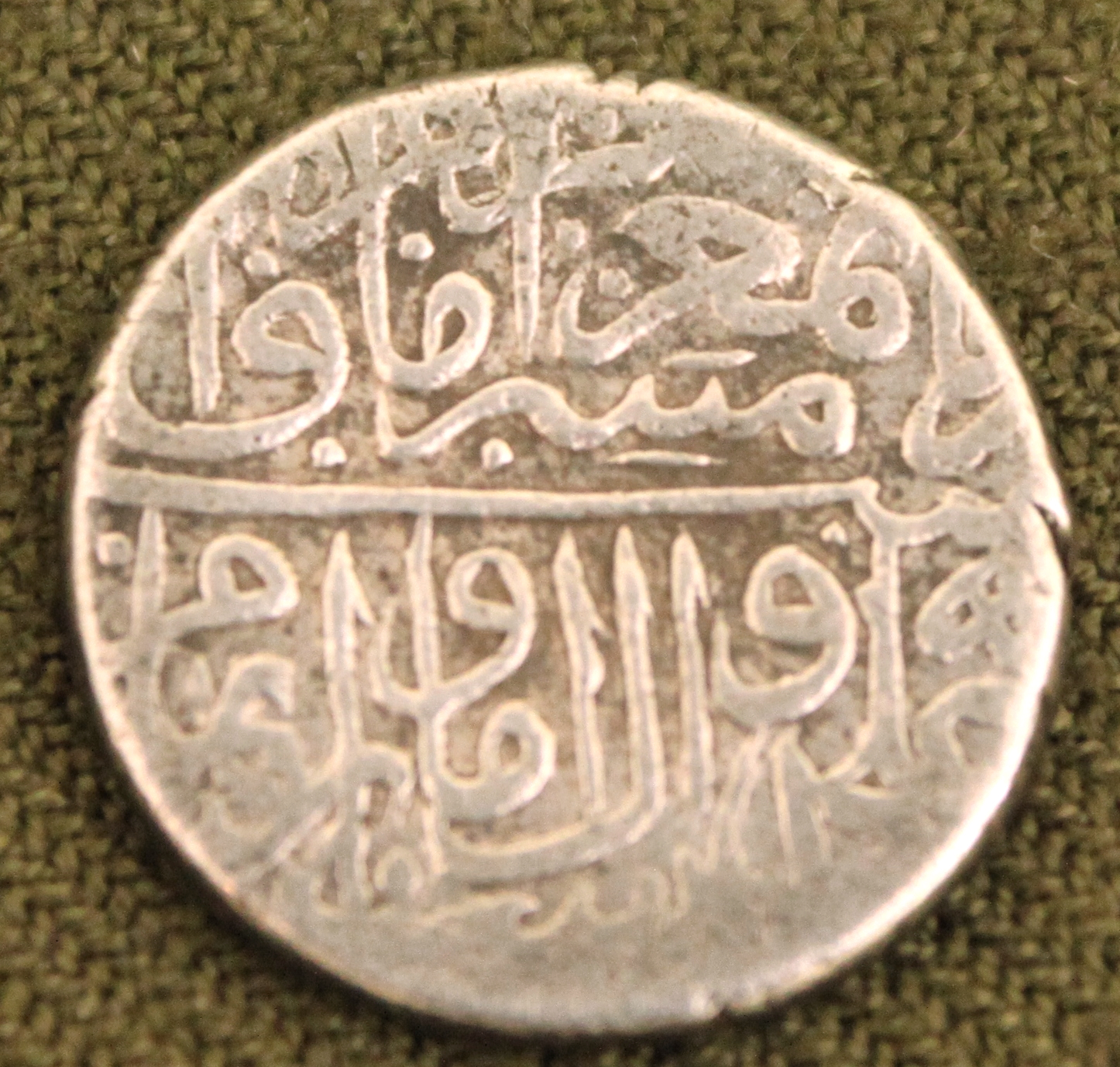
Coin of Ismail II, dated 1576.

During Ismail's short reign, the coin production became increasingly centralised as the number of mints decreased to twenty. The silver shahi coin under his reign weighed 2.30 grams (0.081 oz) (i.e., a half-mesqal) and his monetary also continued to use larins, inherited from Larestan and tankas (a common currency rooted in Indian subcontinent). His copper coins were not issued to the public, but the texts on it were different from those of his father, namely, the recurrent insistence on minting Ismail's takhallus (pen name), Adeli.

On Ismail's inaugural coins a part of Attar's poem, "‘From the east to the west, if there is an Imam/Ali and his family are everything to us!", was minted. This was seen by Walther Hinz as part of his Sunni proclivities due to him not being comfortable with the phrase "There is no deity but God. Muhammad is the messenger of God. Ali is the vicegerent of God (Note: This is a part of the Shia Islamic oath, the Shahada.)", previously minted in the Safavid coins because the phrase regarding Ali contrasted with his Sunni beliefs. However, Mitchell rejects this line of argumentation, seeing the phrase as part of standard stock of Shi'ite expressions, one which even Ismail I, an unquestionably stringent partisan of Ali, had used in a letter to the Uzbek Khan in declaring victory.

Ismail II Safavid dynasty Born: 31 May 1537 Died: 24 November 1577
Iranian royalty
Preceded by Tahmasp I	Shah of Iran; 1576–1577	Succeeded by Mohammad Khodabanda
