= Zoroastrianism in Safavid Iran =

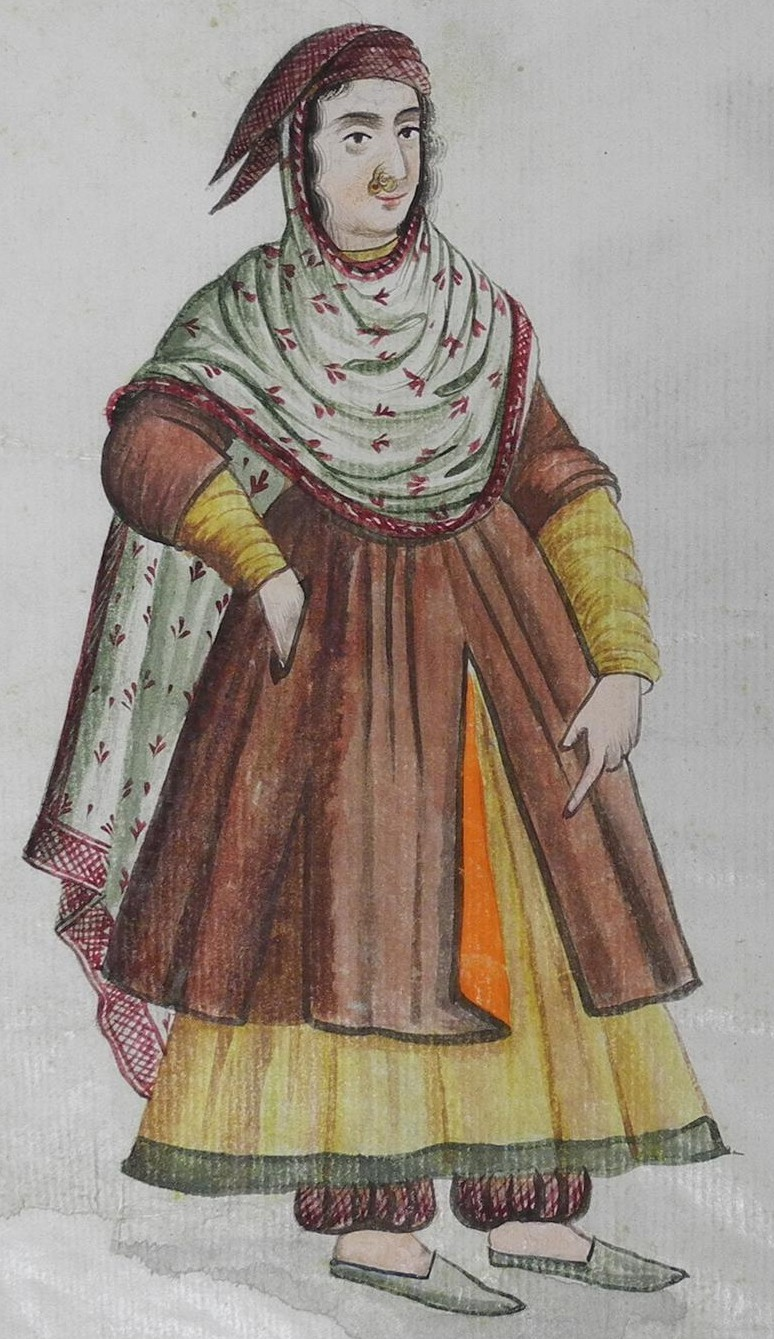
A Zoroastrian woman, dated 1684/85

In Safavid Iran (1501–1736), the historical Zoroastrians centres of Yazd and Kerman were mostly part of the khasseh jurisdiction (crown domain). In exchange for security assurances from the shah and the royal family against regional elites and non-khasseh elements, the Zoroastrians provided the khasseh with money and unpaid work. Because this khasseh protection was unstable and limited, the mamalek (provincial) administration managed to subject the Zoroastrians to periodic extortion and mistreatment. The position of Zoroastrians depended heavily on the shifting balance of power between the khasseh and mamalek branches of the Safavid administration.

The Safavid institutionalization of Shia Islam was frequently executed through violent methods. Under the pressure of zealous Shia clergy members (mullahs), the Zoroastrian population faced a growing threat of forced conversion to Islam.

The Safavid conquest of Yazd is presented as a brutal event in most 16th century Persian chronicles, noting that many allies of the Aq Qoyunlu were killed. The violence did not occur in the suburbs where the Zoroastrians resided, but its rural surroundings. In the winter of 1505, Ismail I lead punitive campaigns against the surrounding towns of Abarkuh and Tabas, thus abruptly ending his stay in Yazd.

The premature departure of Safavid troops lifted the financial pressures caused by the long-term military presence in Yazd from the local inhabitants, including the Zoroastrian community. During his journey back to Isfahan from Yazd, Ismail I allegedly made a stop in Ardakan, which was mostly inhabited by Zoroastrians. There he received a friendly reception by local notables, including Zoroastrian grandees and religious dignitaries.

Safavid-era chronicles rarely mention the Zoroastrians. Short but valuable observations on Zoroastrians in Yazd and Isfahan during the reign of Shah Abbas I (r. 1587–1629) can be found in the works of historians Afushta'i Natanzi and Fazli Isfahani Khuzani. Information about the Zoroastrians of Kerman comes mostly from the 17th century historian Mir Mohammad Sa'id Mashizi Barsiri.

Information about the Zoroastrians of Yazd is provided by several local historians, particularly Mohammad ibn Mahmud Bafqi from the 16th century. The Sistan province possessed the largest number of Zoroastrian inhabitants in Safavid Iran. Despite this, very little information about them appears in Malik Hossein Sistani's local chronicle of Sistan composed under Shah Abbas I.

== Sources ==
- Choksy, Jamsheed K. (2015). "Zoroastrianism ii. Historical Review: from the Arab Conquest to Modern Times". In Yarshater, Ehsan (ed.). Encyclopædia Iranica (Online ed.). Encyclopædia Iranica Foundation. ISBN 978-0710090997.
- Ghereghlou, Kioumars (2017). "On the margins of minority life: Zoroastrians and the state in Safavid Iran". Bulletin of the School of Oriental and African Studies. 80 (1). Cambridge University Press: 45–71. JSTOR 26358120.
