= Haydar Mirza Safavi =

Safavid prince (1554–1576)

Haydar Mirza Safavi حیدر میرزا صفوی
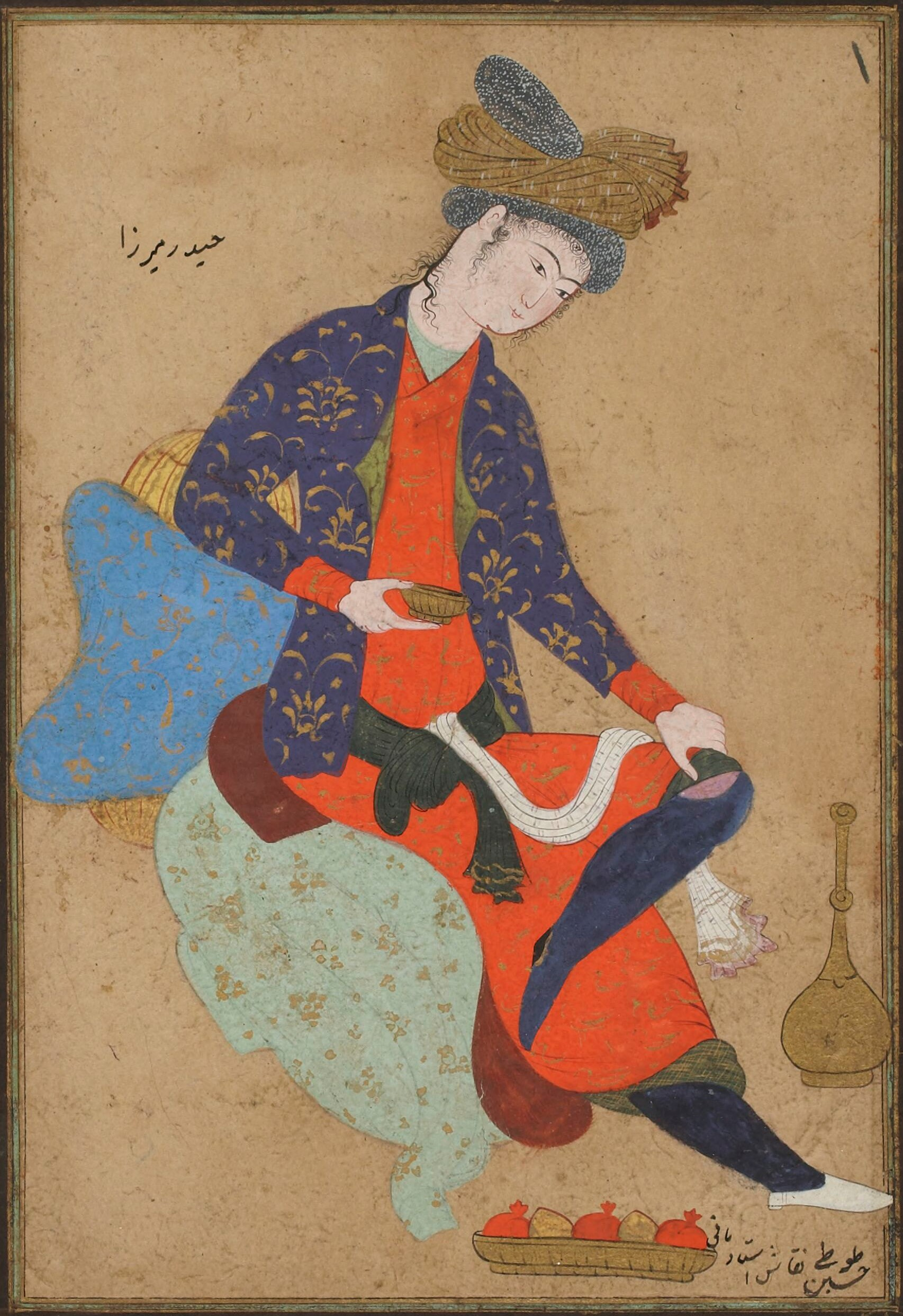
- Haydar Mirza, by Hossein Tooti, dated 16th century

Shah of Iran (claimant)
- Reign: 14 May 1576 – 15 May 1576
- Opposing: Ismail II
- Born: 18 September 1554; Iran
- Died: 15 May 1576 (aged 22); Qazvin, Iran
- Dynasty: Safavid
- Father: Tahmasp I
- Mother: Sultanzadeh Khanum
- Religion: Shia Islam

Haydar Mirza Safavi (Persian: حیدر میرزا صفوی, also spelled Haidar Mirza Safavi) (18 September 1554 – 15 May 1576) was a Safavid prince who declared himself as the king (shah) of Iran on 15 May 1576, the day after his father Tahmasp I had died. He was, however, killed that same day by the Qizilbash tribes that favoured his brother Ismail Mirza Safavi as the successor of their father. His mother was Sultanzadeh Khanum, a Georgian lady.

== Biography ==
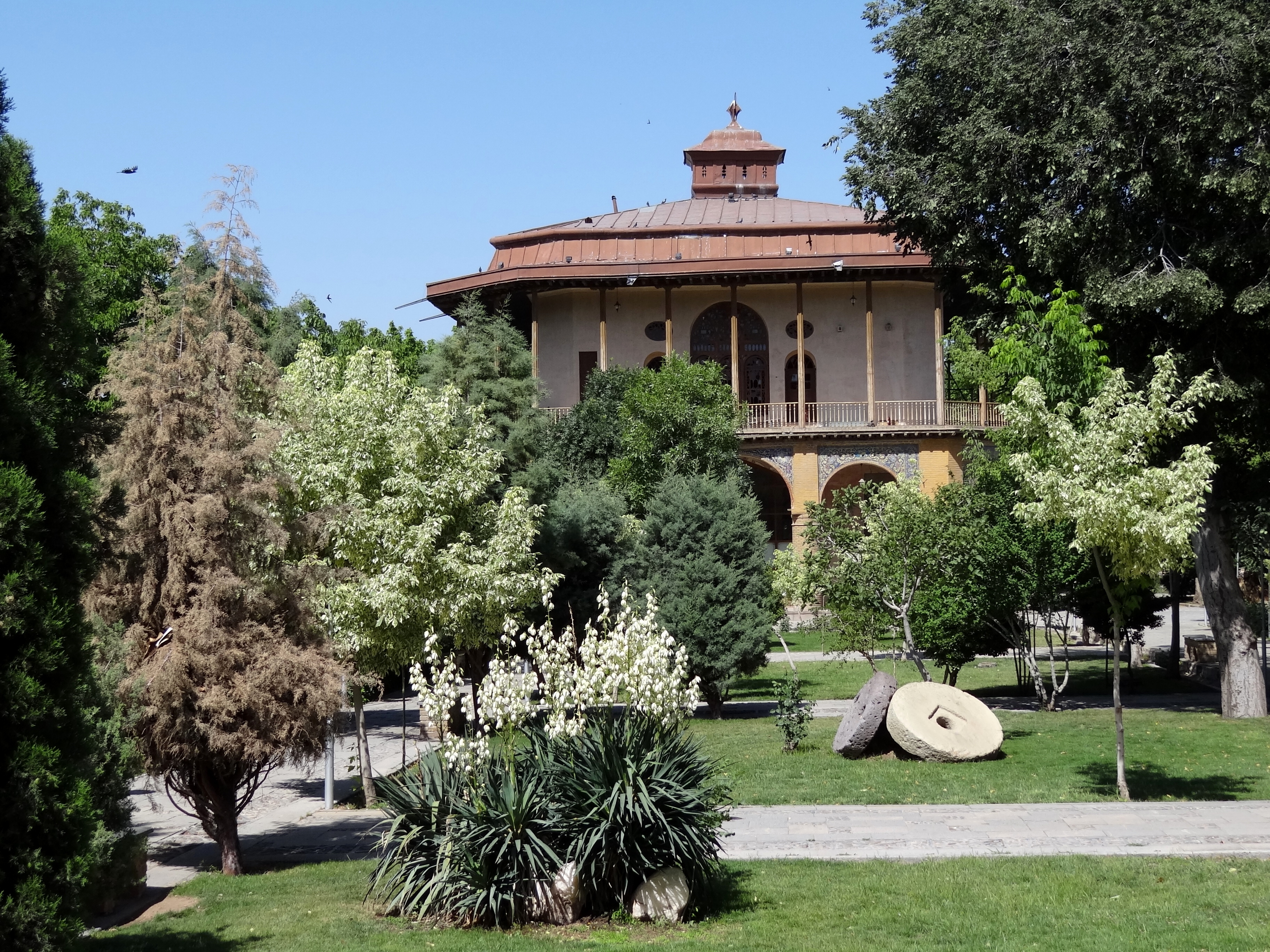
The 16th-century Chehel Sotun palace in Qazvin, where Haydar Mirza Safavi resided.

Haydar Mirza was the son of Tahmasp I and Sultanzadeh Khanum, a Georgian noblewoman. His mother was a sister of the Georgian converts Aman Beg (an influential nobleman) and Ali Khan Beg.

On 18 October 1574, Tahmasp I became ill. During his illness, he was twice close to death, but had not chosen a successor. In response the main chieftains of the Qizilbash met to discuss who should be the successor. The Ustajlu clan, and the Sheykhavand family (who were related to the Safavid family) favoured Haydar Mirza. The Georgians also supported him, since his mother was Georgian.

The Rumlu, Afshar and Qajar clans favoured Ismail Mirza Safavi, who was jailed in the Qahqaheh Castle. Tahmasp's daughter Pari Khan Khanum also favoured Ismail Mirza. While Tahmasp was still ill, those who supported Haydar Mirza sent a message to the castellan of Qahqaheh Castle, named Khalifa Ansar Qaradghlu. They requested him to have Ismail Mirza killed. However, Pari Khan Khanum managed to find out about it and told Tahmasp about the plot. Tahmasp, who still favoured Ismail Mirza because of the courage he had shown in battles with the Ottoman Empire, sent Afshar musketeers to the Qahqaheh Castle to protect him. Two months later, Tahmasp recovered from what has seemed to be his life-threatening illness. However, two years later, on 14 May 1576, he died in Qazvin. Haydar Mirza was the only son who was with him when he died, and thus the following day, he announced that he was to be the new king. Normally, some Qizilbash tribes would guard the royal palace and take turns with others. Unfortunately for Haydar Mirza, on that day all the Qizilbash guards were either from the Rumlu, Afshar, Qajar, Bayat, or the Dorsaq tribe — all loyal supporters of Ismail Mirza.

When Haydar Mirza found out about the dangerous position he was in, he took Pari Khan Khanum (who was also in the palace) "into custody as a precautionary measure" (Parsadust). Pari Khan Khanum then "threw herself at her brother's feet in the presence of Haydar Mirza's mother", and tried to urge him to let her leave the palace, stating that she was the first to acknowledge his rule by prostrating herself in front of him. She vowed that she would attempt to persuade Ismail Mirza's supporters to change their minds, which included her full brother Suleiman Mirza and her Circassian uncle Shamkhal Sultan. Haydar Mirza accepted her request and gave her permission to leave the palace. However, after she left the palace, she broke her oath and gave Shamkhal the keys to the gate of the palace.

When the supporters of Haydar Mirza found out about the threat facing their king, they hurried to his royal residence to protect him. However, the palace guards, who disliked Haydar Mirza (although he had tried to win them to his side by making several promises), closed the entrances of the palace. At the same time, the supporters of Ismail Mirza entered the palace and went to its inner section. However, Haydar Mirza's supporters quickly managed to break through the gate, but did not reach him in time. Ismail Mirza's supporters found Haydar Mirza dressed as a woman in the royal harem. He was immediately captured and beheaded. His bloody head was then thrown down to Haydar Mirza's supporters, who ceased their resistance, which meant that Ismail Mirza could safely ascend the throne.

== Sources ==
- Maeda, Hirotake (2021). "Against all odds: the Safavids and the Georgians". In Matthee, Rudi (ed.). The Safavid World. Routledge. ISBN 978-1138944060.
- Matthee, Rudi (2011). Persia in Crisis: Safavid Decline and the Fall of Isfahan. I.B.Tauris. pp. 1–371. ISBN 978-0857731814.
- Babaie, Sussan (2004). Slaves of the Shah: New Elites of Safavid Iran. I.B.Tauris. pp. 1–218. ISBN 9781860647215.
- Newman, Andrew J. (2008). Safavid Iran: Rebirth of a Persian Empire. I.B.Tauris. pp. 1–281. ISBN 9780857716613.
- Savory, Roger (2007). Iran under the Safavids. Cambridge University Press. pp. 1–288. ISBN 978-0521042512.
- Roemer, H.R. (1986). "The Safavid period". The Cambridge History of Iran, Volume 5: The Timurid and Safavid periods. Cambridge: Cambridge University Press. pp. 189–351. ISBN 9780521200943.
- Parsadust, Manuchehr (2009). "PARIḴĀN ḴĀNOM". Encyclopaedia Iranica.
- Nashat, Guity; Beck, Lois (2003). Women in Iran from the Rise of Islam to 1800. University of Illinois Press. pp. 1–253. ISBN 978-0-252-07121-8.
- Daryaee, Touraj (2012). The Oxford Handbook of Iranian History. Oxford University Press. pp. 1–432. ISBN 978-0199875757. Archived from the original on 2019-01-01.
- Blow, David (2009). Shah Abbas: The Ruthless King Who became an Iranian Legend. London, UK: I. B. Tauris & Co. Ltd. ISBN 978-1-84511-989-8. LCCN 2009464064.
- Mitchell, Colin P. (2009). The Practice of Politics in Safavid Iran: Power, Religion and Rhetoric. I.B.Tauris. pp. 1–304. ISBN 978-0857715883.
