= Makhdum Sharifi Shirazi =

16th-century Persian Sunni scholar

Makhdum Sharifi Shirazi (Persian: مخدوم شریفی شیرازی) was a Persian Sunni statesman and author, who served as the minister of religious affairs (sadr) during the reign of Ismail II (r. 1576–77), and ultimately took refuge in the Ottoman Empire, where he wrote the al-Nawaqez le-bonyān al-rawafez, a sizable anti-Shia argumentative book.

== Sources ==
- Matthee, Rudi (2011). Persia in Crisis: Safavid Decline and the Fall of Isfahan. I.B.Tauris. pp. 1–371. ISBN 978-0-85773-181-4.
- Ghereghlou, Kioumars (2016). "MAḴDUM ŠARIFI ŠIRĀZI". In Yarshater, Ehsan (ed.). Encyclopædia Iranica (Online ed.). Encyclopædia Iranica Foundation.
- Ghereghlou, Kioumars (2019). "A Safavid Bureaucrat in the Ottoman World: Mirza Makhdum Sharifi Shirazi and the Quest for Upward Mobility in the İlmiye Hierarchy". Osmanlı Araştırmaları / The Journal of Ottoman Studies: 153–194. doi:10.7916/d8-m5px-mb97.
- Newman, Andrew J. (2008). Safavid Iran: Rebirth of a Persian Empire. I.B.Tauris. pp. 1–281. ISBN 978-0-85771-661-3.
- Savory, Roger (2007). Iran under the Safavids. Cambridge University Press. pp. 1–288. ISBN 978-0-521-04251-2.
- Roemer, H.R. (1986). "The Safavid period". The Cambridge History of Iran, Volume 5: The Timurid and Safavid periods. Cambridge: Cambridge University Press. pp. 189–351. ISBN 978-0-521-20094-3.
- Parsadust, Manuchehr (2009). "PARIḴĀN ḴĀNOM". Encyclopaedia Iranica.
- Daryaee, Touraj (2012). The Oxford Handbook of Iranian History. Oxford University Press. pp. 1–432. ISBN 978-0-19-987575-7. Archived from the original on 2019-01-01.
- Blow, David (2009). Shah Abbas: The Ruthless King Who became an Iranian Legend. London, UK: I. B. Tauris & Co. Ltd. ISBN 978-1-84511-989-8. LCCN 2009464064.
- Mitchell, Colin P. (2009). The Practice of Politics in Safavid Iran: Power, Religion and Rhetoric. I.B.Tauris. pp. 1–304. ISBN 978-0-85771-588-3.
