= Badi-al Zaman Mirza Safavi =

Safavid prince (d. 26 March 1577)

Badi-al Zaman Mirza

Governor of Sistan
- Tenure: 1557–1577
- Died: 26 March 1577; Qandahar
- Spouse: Pari Khan Khanum
- Dynasty: Safavid
- Father: Bahram Mirza Safavi
- Religion: Twelver Shia Islam

Badi-al Zaman Mirza Safavi (Persian: بدیع‌الزمان میرزا صفوی; died 26 March 1577) was a Safavid prince. He was the son of prominent military leader Bahram Mirza Safavi, who was the youngest son of Ismail I, the founder of the Safavid Empire.

Badi-al Zaman had two brothers named Ibrahim Mirza and Soltan Hosayn Mirza. When Badi-al Zaman's father died in 1549, he and his other siblings were taken care of by Tahmasp, who even announced Badi-al Zaman as his own son. Badi al-Zaman was appointed as the governor of Sistan in 1557, and married Pari Khan Khanum (who was at that time 10 years old). However, since she was Tahmasp's favored daughter, she was not allowed to go alongside her husband to Sistan. Other historians have noted that Pari Khan Khanum was only engaged to Badi al-Zaman, which according to Gholsorkhi seems more believable. The marriage allegedly went no further, since Pari Khan Khanum chose a bureaucratic life in the capital, alongside her father, over married life in Sistan.

On 26 March 1577, Badi-al Zaman Mirza was assassinated in Qandahar on the orders of Ismail II (r. 1576–77).

== Sources ==
- Soucek, P. (1988). "BAHRĀM MĪRZĀ". Encyclopaedia Iranica, Vol. III, Fasc. 5. pp. 523–524.
- Parsadust, Manuchehr (2009). "PARIḴĀN ḴĀNOM". Encyclopaedia Iranica.
- Mitchell, Colin P. (2009). The Practice of Politics in Safavid Iran: Power, Religion and Rhetoric. I.B.Tauris. pp. 1–304. ISBN 978-0857715883.
- Gholsorkhi, Shohreh (1995). Pari Khan Khanum: A Masterful Safavid Princess. Vol. 28. Iranian Studies, vol. 28, no. 3/4. pp. 143–156. doi:10.1080/00210869508701833. ISBN 0857731815. JSTOR 4310940.
