= Mohtasham Kashani =

Iranian poet (1500–1588)

Muhtasham Kashani (1528–1588) (Persian: محتشم کاشانی) was an Iranian poet of the Safavid era. He was influential in Shi'ite religious poetry, especially marsiyah poetry mourning the tragedy of Ashura. He was born in Kashan, where he spent all of his life. He is well-known for his poetry about Imam al-Husayn's martyrdom, especially for his elegy, باز این چه شورش است که در خلق عالم است bāz in če šureši-st ke dar ḵalq-e ʿālam ast "What is this tumult now among the world’s creatures?" in the form of tarkib band.. His elegy was popular during the Qajar dynasty, and in the present day, is often pressed into cloth that drape entire cities in Iran during Ashura.

His main occupation, like that of his father, was in the cloth industry (in Kashan) before he took up poetry. Before his death, he entrusted the poet and literary biographer, Taqi-al-Din Kashani the collection and arrangement of his literary remains
