= Kholāsat al-tavārikh =

16th century book on Safavid history

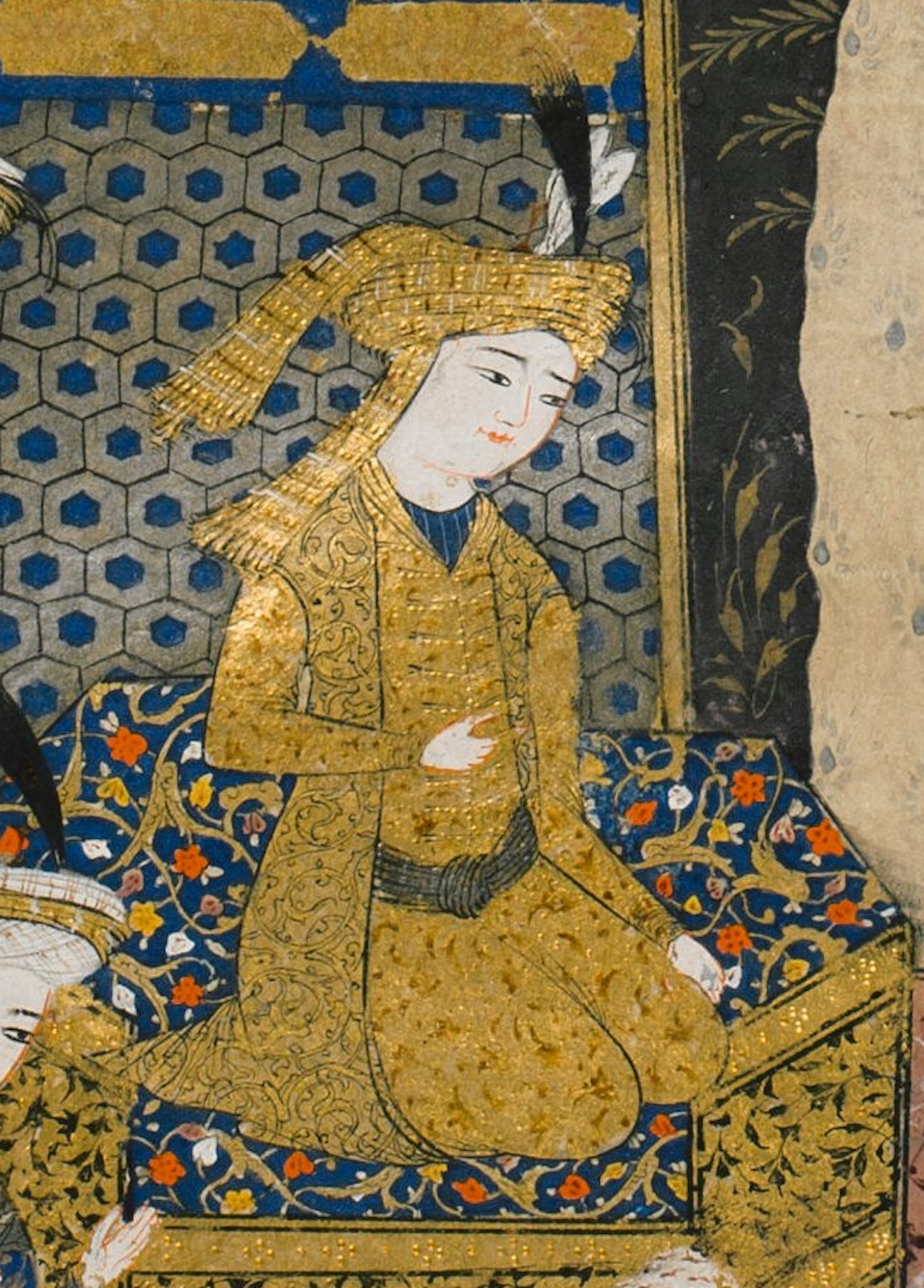
Prince Abbas enthroned, proclaimed Shah in Khorasan in 1581, as depicted in Kholāsat al-tavārikh

Kholāsat al-tavārikh, also Ḫulāṣat at-tawārīḫ or Kholassat ot-Tavarikh (Persian: کتاب خلاصة التواریخ, lit. 'The Essence of Histories') is a history of the early Safavid Empire, written by Ahmad Monshi Ghomi. The last events recorded in the manuscript date to 1592 suggesting a completion date shortly after this date. The copy of the manuscript located in Berlin contains 436 pages on the history of the Safavids from their origins, especially from Ismail I (r. 1501–1524), up to the first years of the reign of Abbas the Great (r. 1587–1629).

== Copies ==
Various copies are known, including:

- Manuscript B, located in Teheran, completed according to the colophon in 1640.
- Manuscript M, located in Teheran in the Kitäbhänä-yimilli-yi Malik.
- Manuscript N, located in Teheran, dated around 1651.

=== Manuscript S (SSB 2202) ===
Located in the Berlin State Library ("SSB"), number: 2202. The name of the copyist and the date of the copy are not given, but it is dated to circa 1695. The cover size is 41.5 x 28 cm. The manuscript has 436 leaves and is paginated with black pencil numbers by a European hand. The volume contains a total of ten miniatures, mostly full-page, each precisely matching the content of the text. The tenth miniature, however, is located at the very end of the manuscript, which depicts a reception scene at the court of an Indian prince, unlike the other miniatures, has no connection with the existing text. This manuscript is fully digitized and available online.

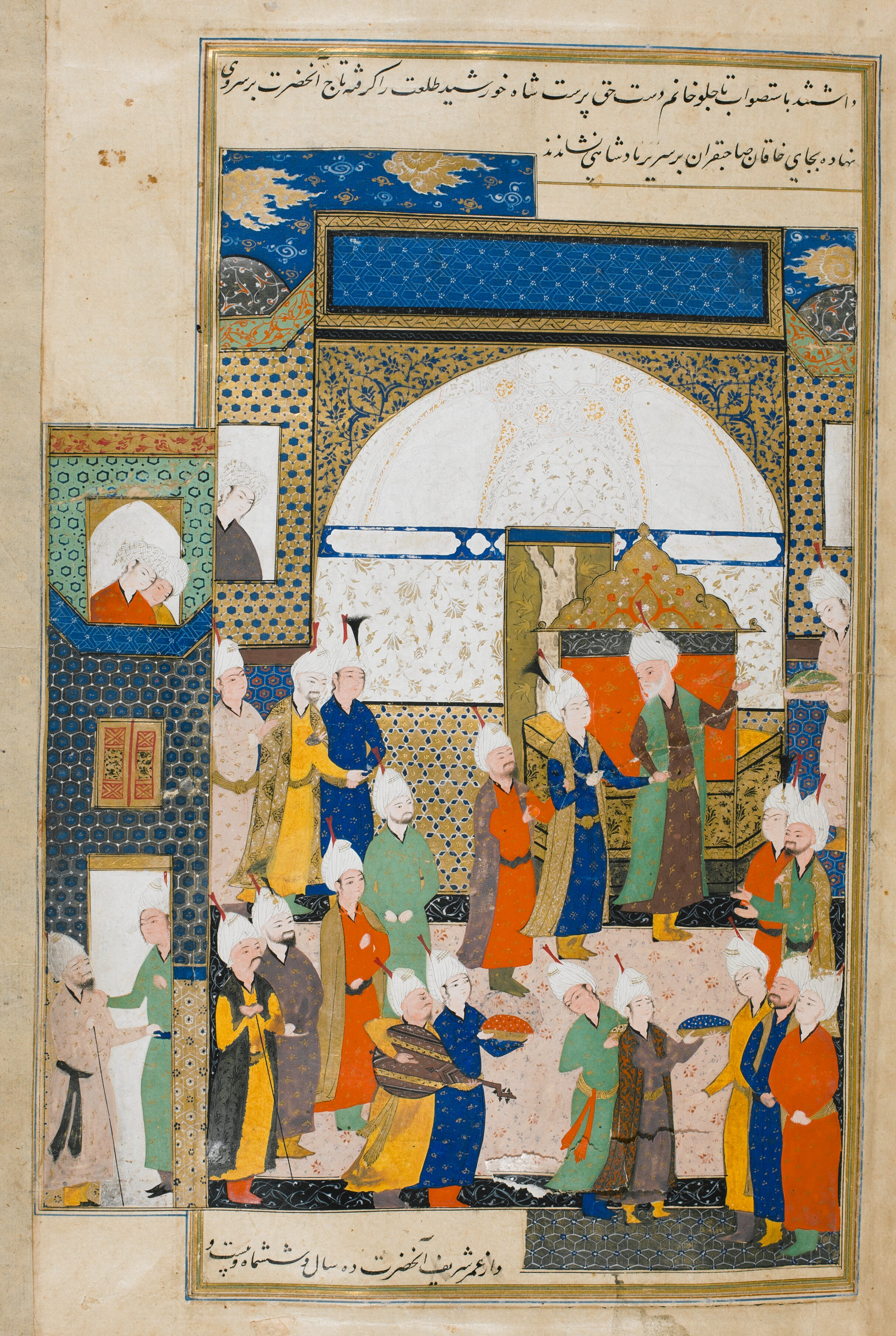
Accession of Shah Tahmasp I to the throne.

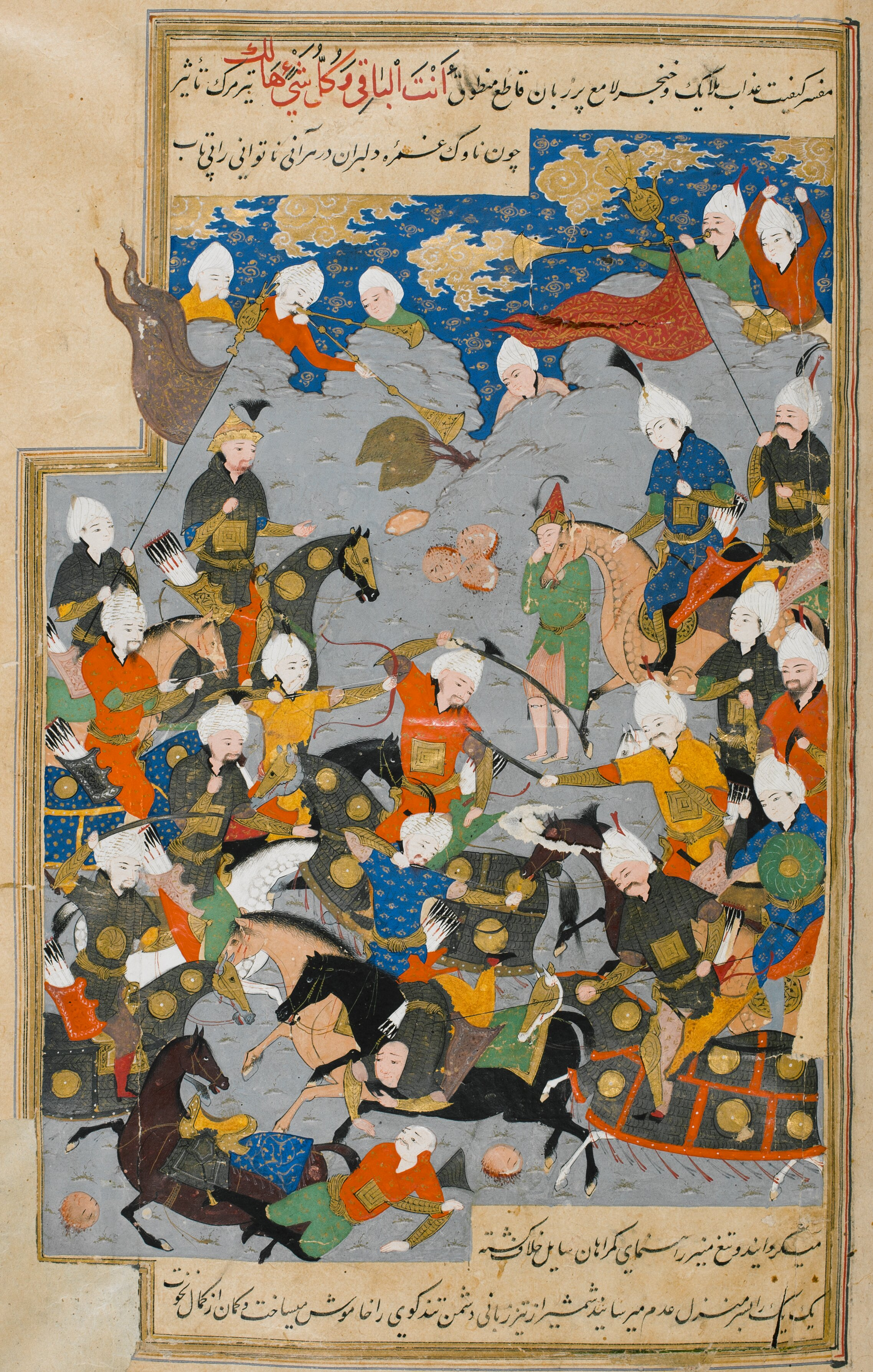
Battle between Shah Tahmasp I and the Uzbeks led by ʽUbaid Khān near Sarikamish on 24 September 1524.

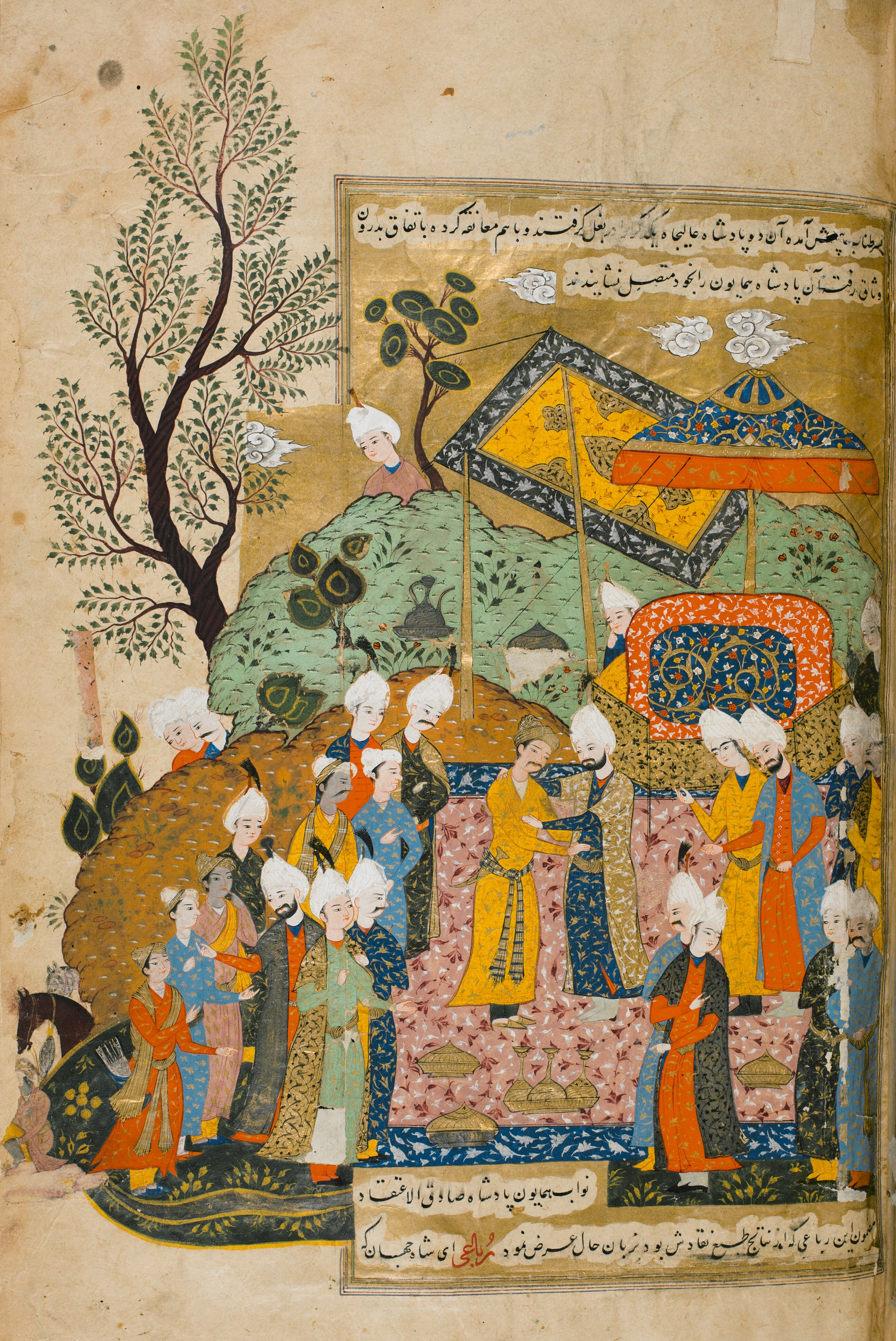
Reception of the fugitive Mughal Emperor Humayun by Shah Tahmasp I

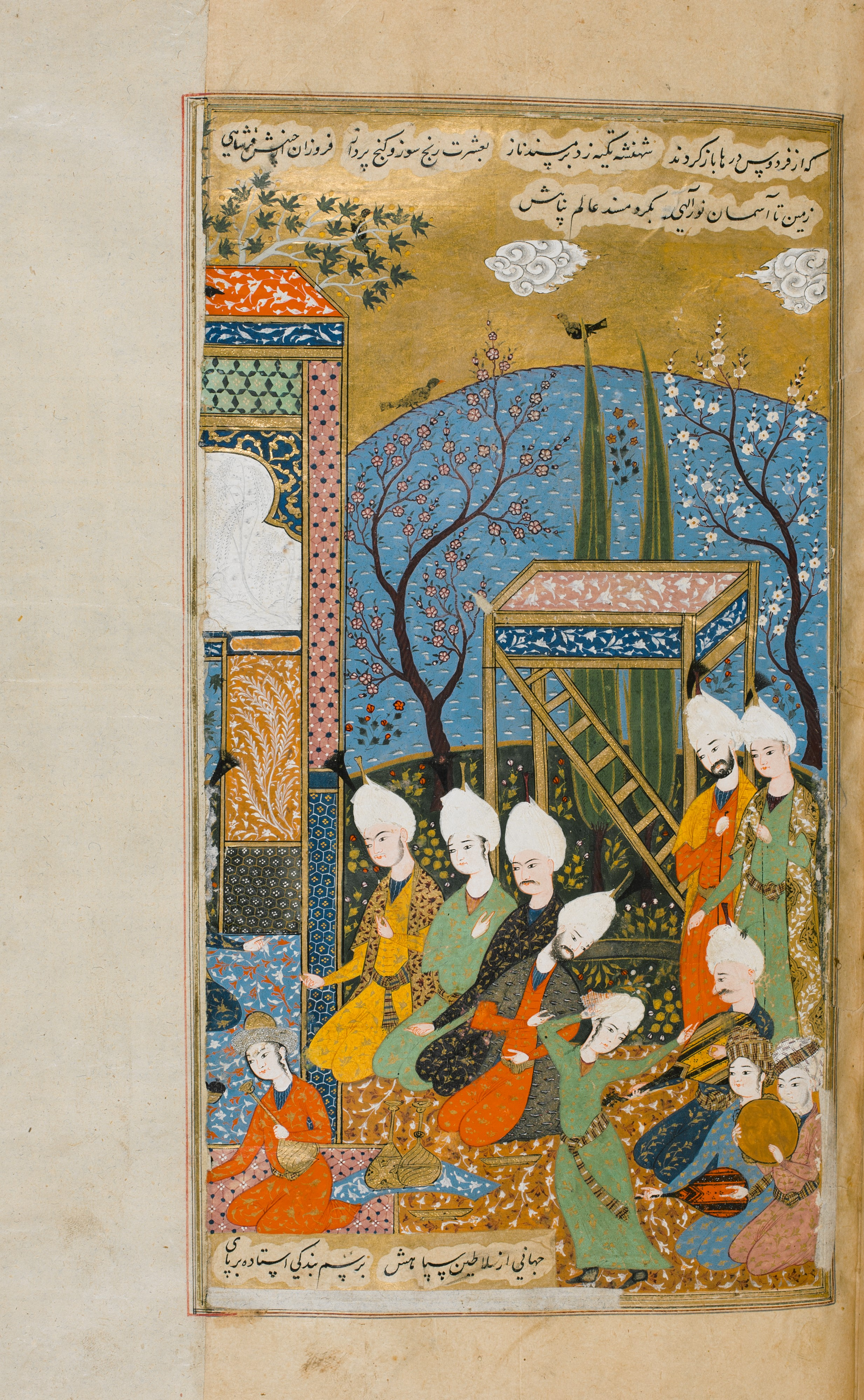
Revelry in Tabriz in the autumn of 1555 on the occasion of the marriage of Prince Ismail (later Shah Ismail II)

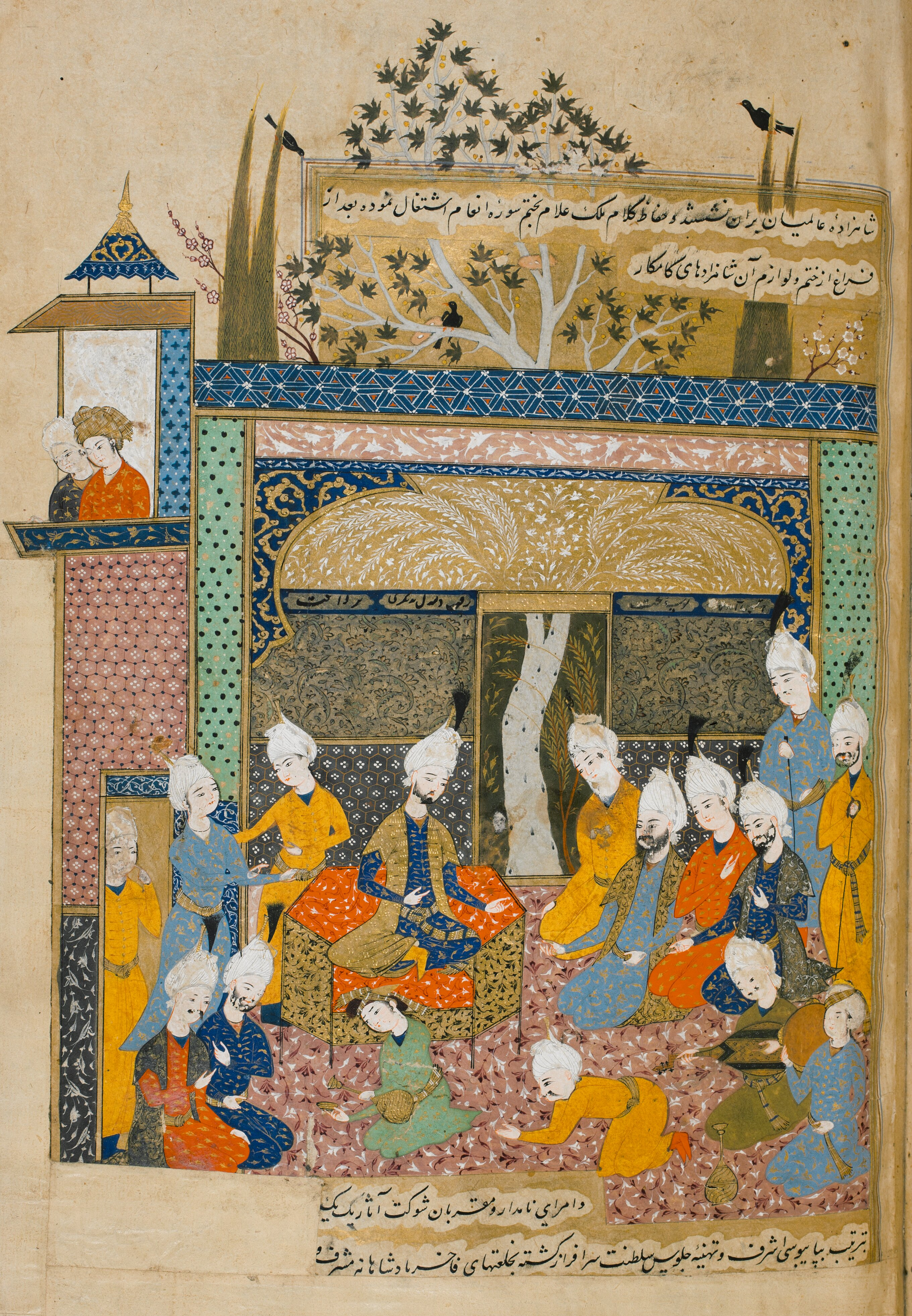
Shah Ismail II on the throne

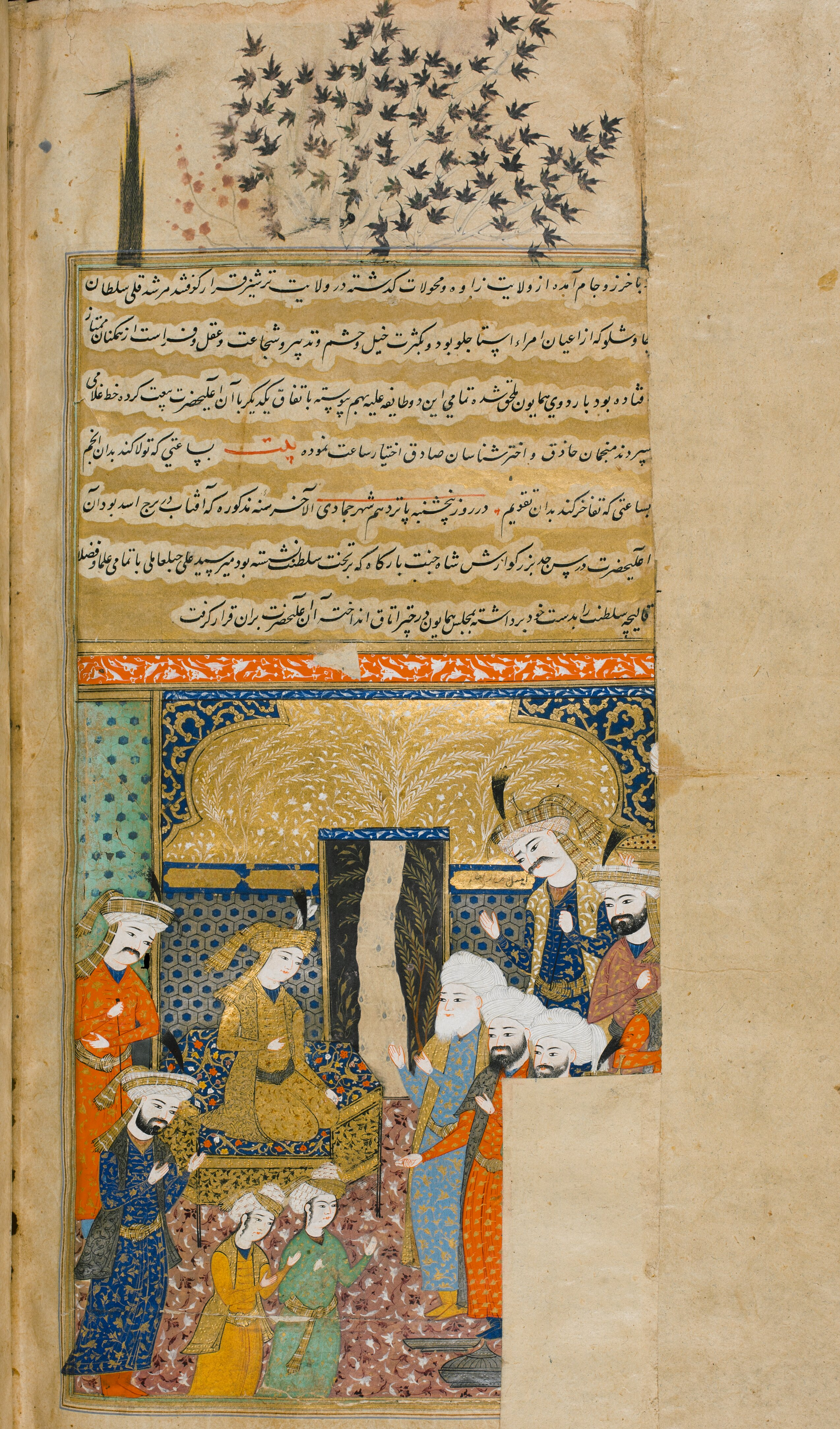
Prince Abbas proclaimed Shah in Khorasan in 1581.

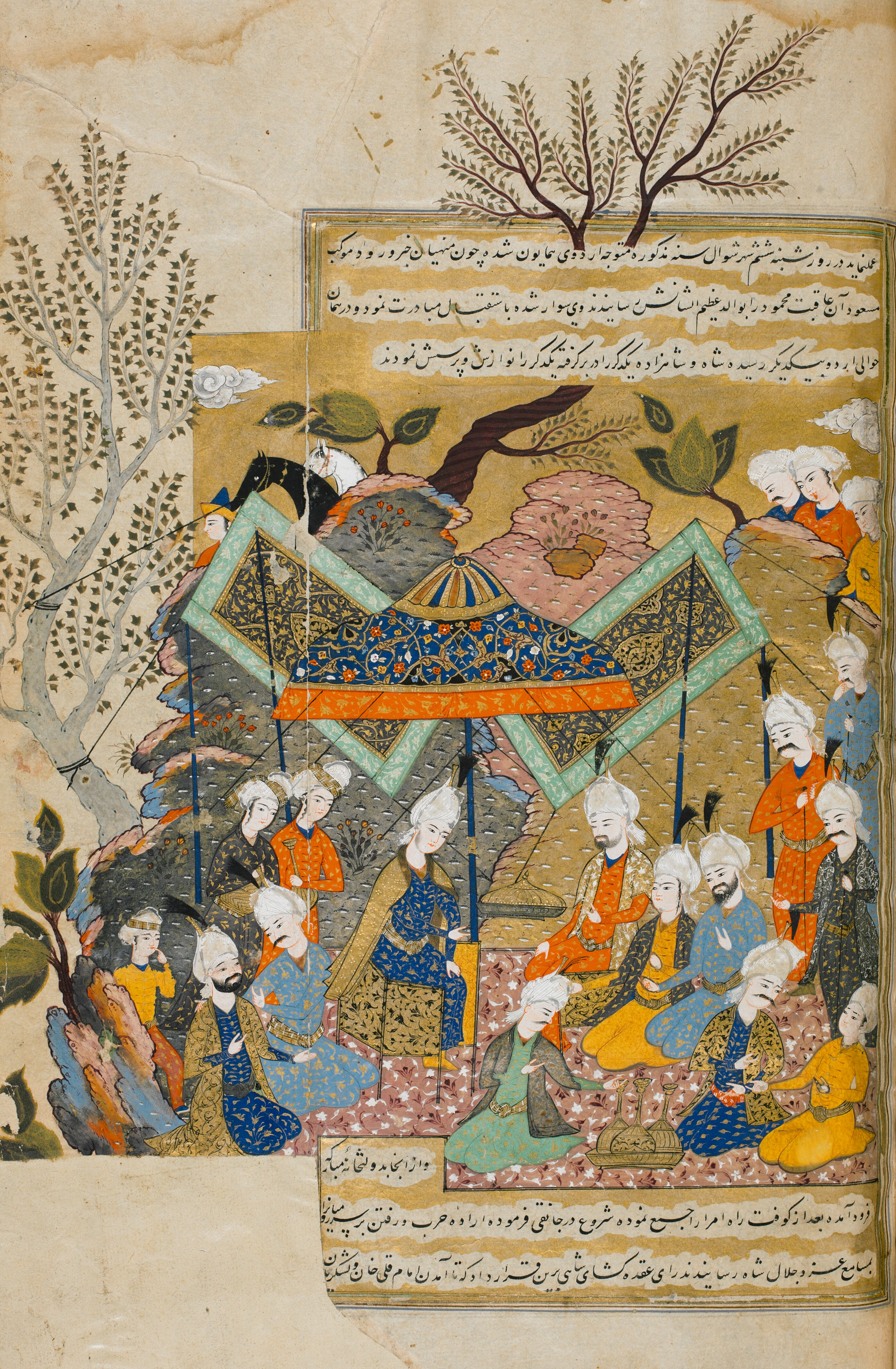
Shah Mohammad Khodabandeh and Prince Hamzeh Mirza celebrate reunion.

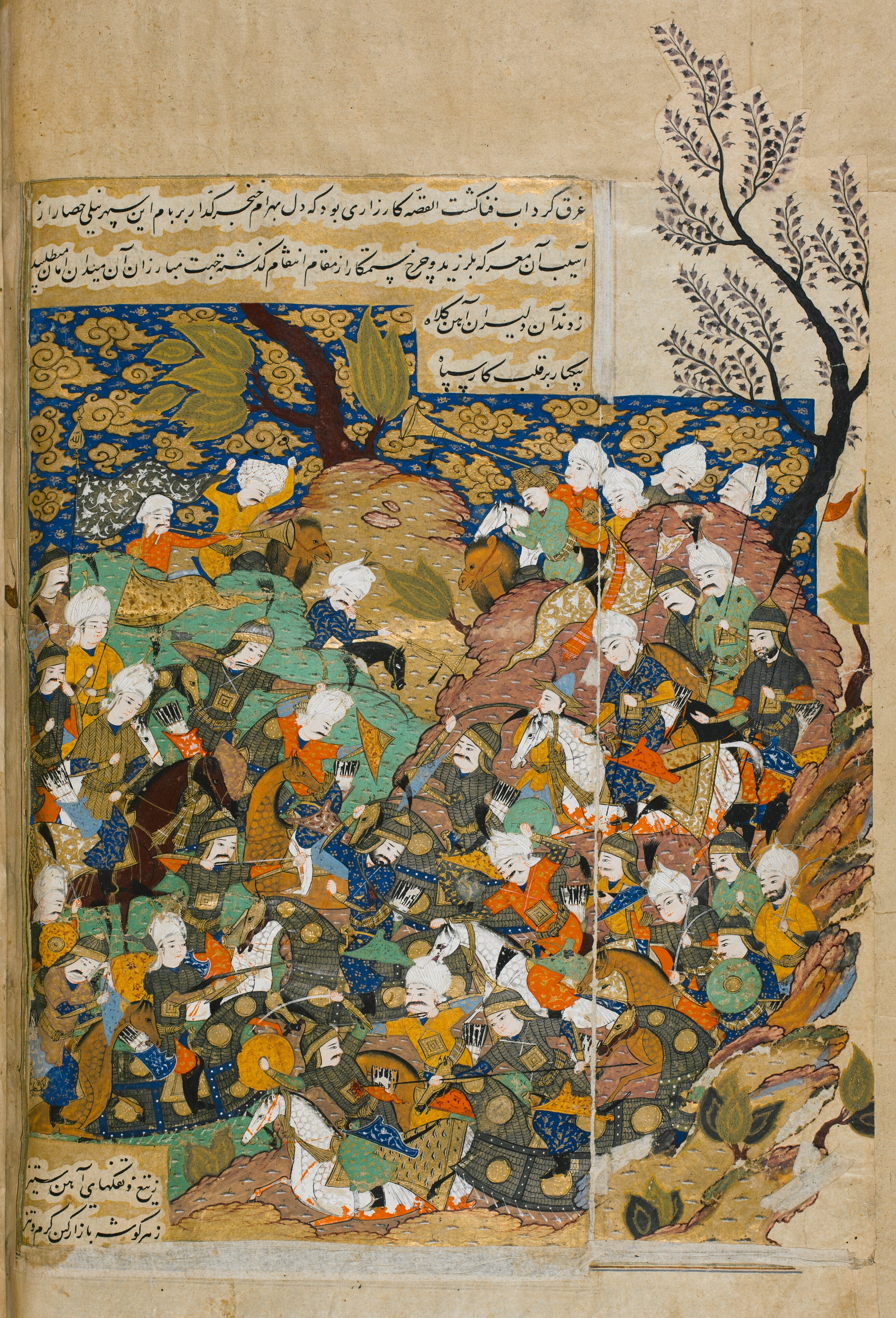
Battle of Prince Hamza Mirza against rebellious Qizilbash emirs.

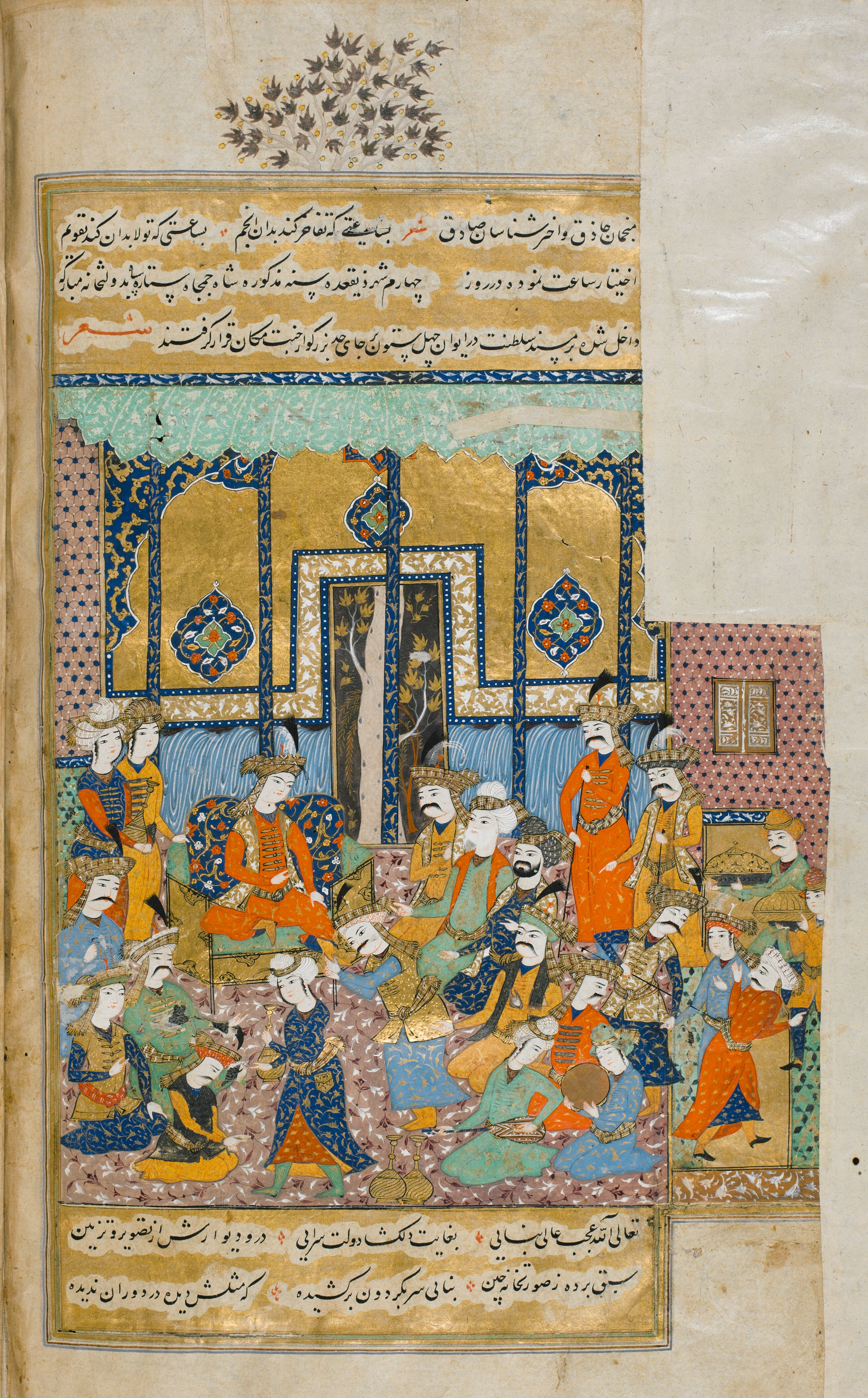
Accession of Shah Abbas I to the throne in Qazvin

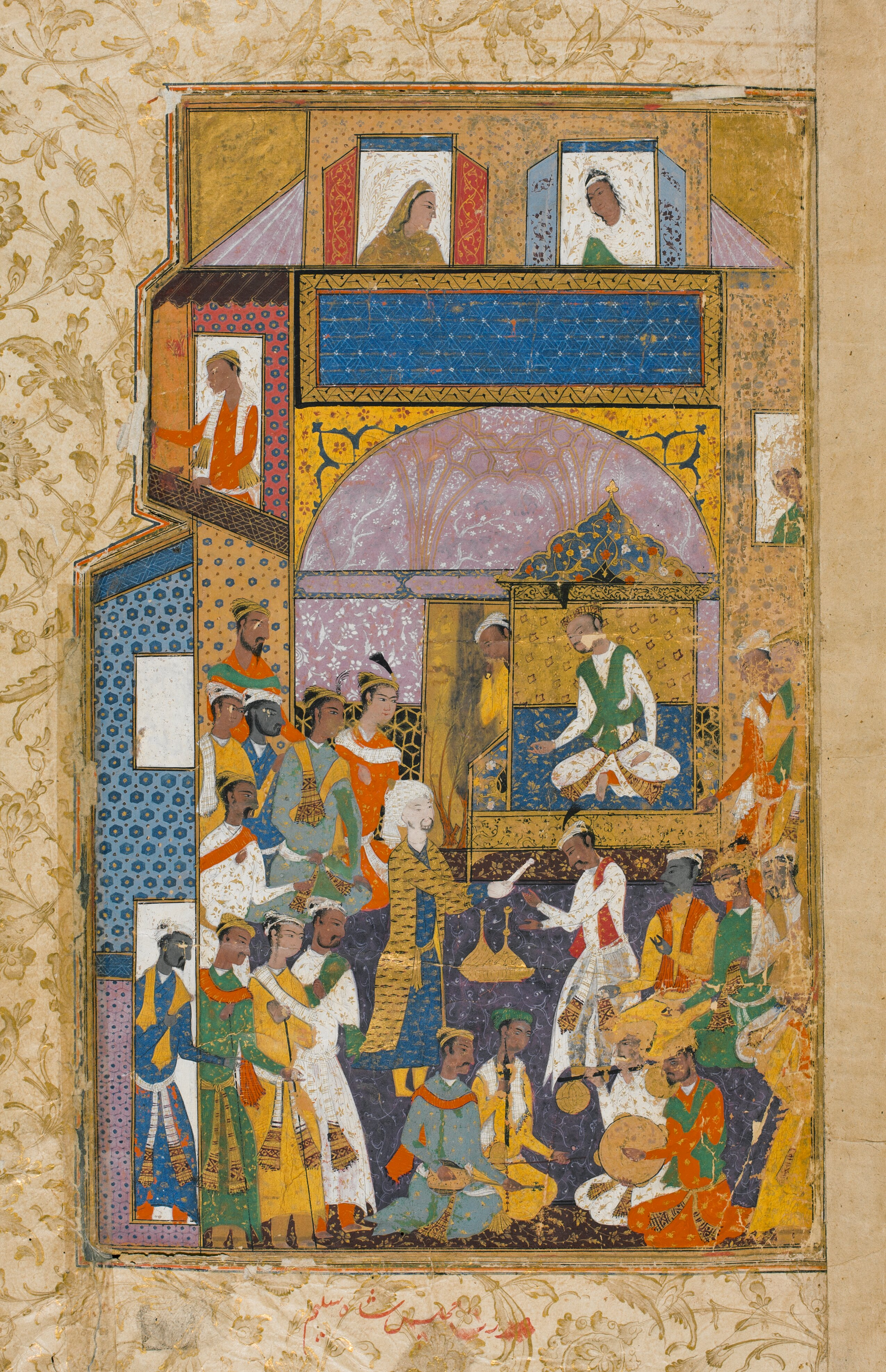
Reception by an unspecified Indian prince at court
