= Imamzadeh Hossein, Qazvin =

Iranian shrine and mosque

Imamzadeh Hossein
- امامزاده حسین
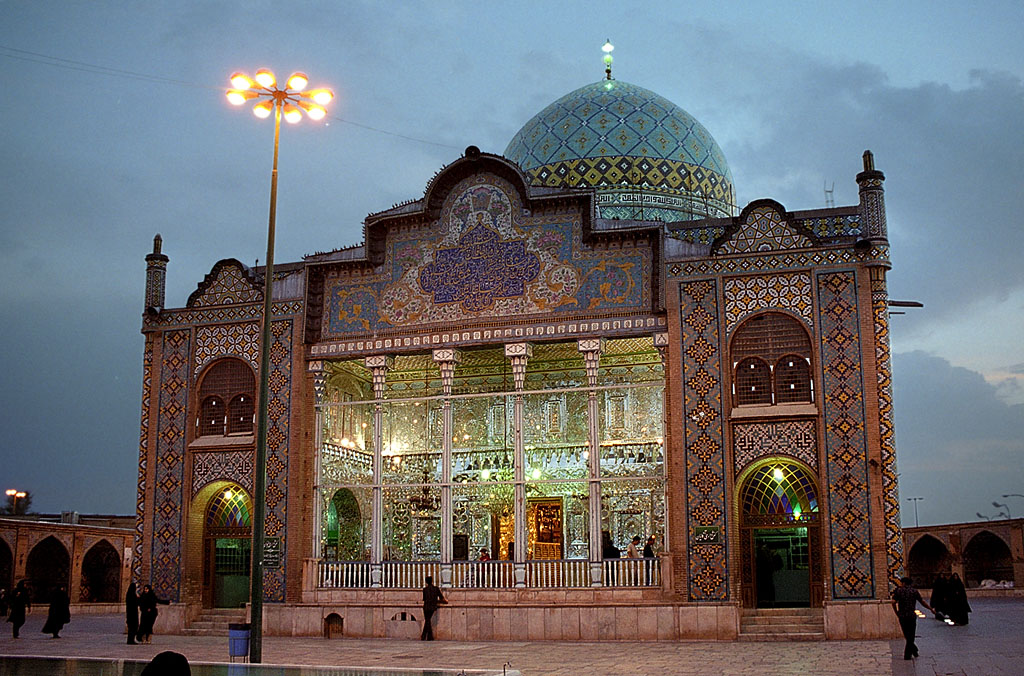

- Location of the complex in Iran

Religion
- Affiliation: Shia Islam
- Ecclesiastical or organisational status: Imamzadeh, mausoleum and mosque
- Status: Active

Location
- Location: Qazvin, Qazvin Province
- Country: Iran
- Interactive map of Imamzadeh Hossein
- Coordinates: 36°15′28″N 50°00′03″E

Architecture
- Type: Mosque architecture
- Style: Ilkhanid; Safavid; Qajar
- Completed: 1404 Common Era (sarcophagus); 1631 CE (renovations); 1889 CE (renovations)

Specifications
- Dome: One
- Minaret: Six
- Shrine: One: Husayn

Iran National Heritage List
- Official name: Emamzadeh Hossein
- Type: Emamzadeh
- Designated: 1935
- Reference no.: 239
- Conservation organization: Cultural Heritage, Handicrafts and Tourism Organization of Iran

The Imamzadeh Hossein (Persian: امامزاده حسین, romanized: Emamzadeh-ye Hossein) is an imamzadeh, mausoleum and mosque complex, located in Qazvin, Iran. The funerary complex contains the grave of Hossein, (Note: also Husayn.) son of the 8th Imam Ali al-Rida.

Built initially during the Ilkhanate period, the complex was extensively renovated by Shah Tahmasp I in the 17th century, during the Safavid Empire. The complex was added to the Iran National Heritage List on 7 December 1935, administered by the Cultural Heritage, Handicrafts and Tourism Organization of Iran. The complex is a holy site in Shia Islam.

== History ==
The namesake of the tomb is the biennial deceased son of Imam Ali al-Rida. This passed in transit with his father to Khorasan in Qazvin in 821 and was buried at the site. Later more people were buried from the Safavid dynasty.

== Architecture ==
The tomb resembles a grand palacepalace structure, complete with its own walled garden, rows of plants, small iwans, niches, gravestones, and exquisite blue-and-cream tile decorations. The façade of the main gate is adorned with six ornamental minarets. A flight of steps leads through the main gate into a spacious courtyard. Directly behind the gate stands a pavilion-like, octagonal fountain house, which forms an important feature of the complex.

The tomb is covered by a blue-yellow tiled dome. The central portion of the building is decorated with numerous mirror mosaics; the mirror mosaics of the vestibule and the tiles of the facades date from the 19th century. In this middle part carried by slender columns porch leads to areas segregated by sex and has two entrances; left for women, right for men. The building may only be entered without shoes.

== Gallery ==
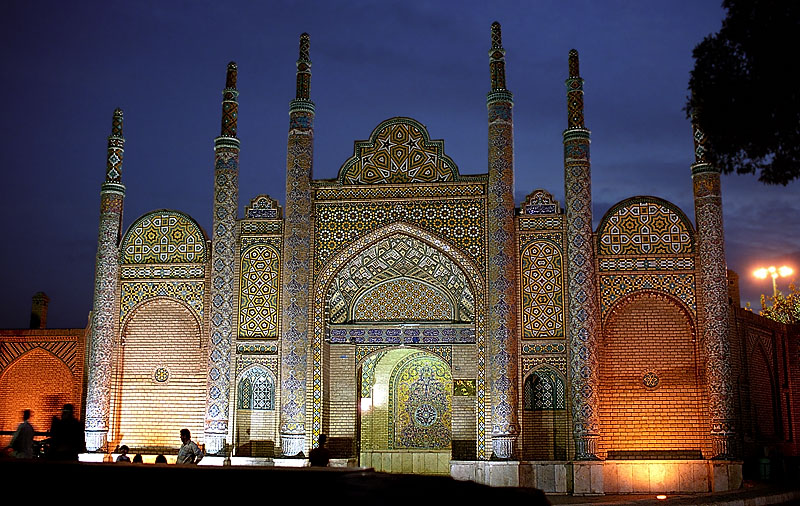
Entrance of the Imamzadeh

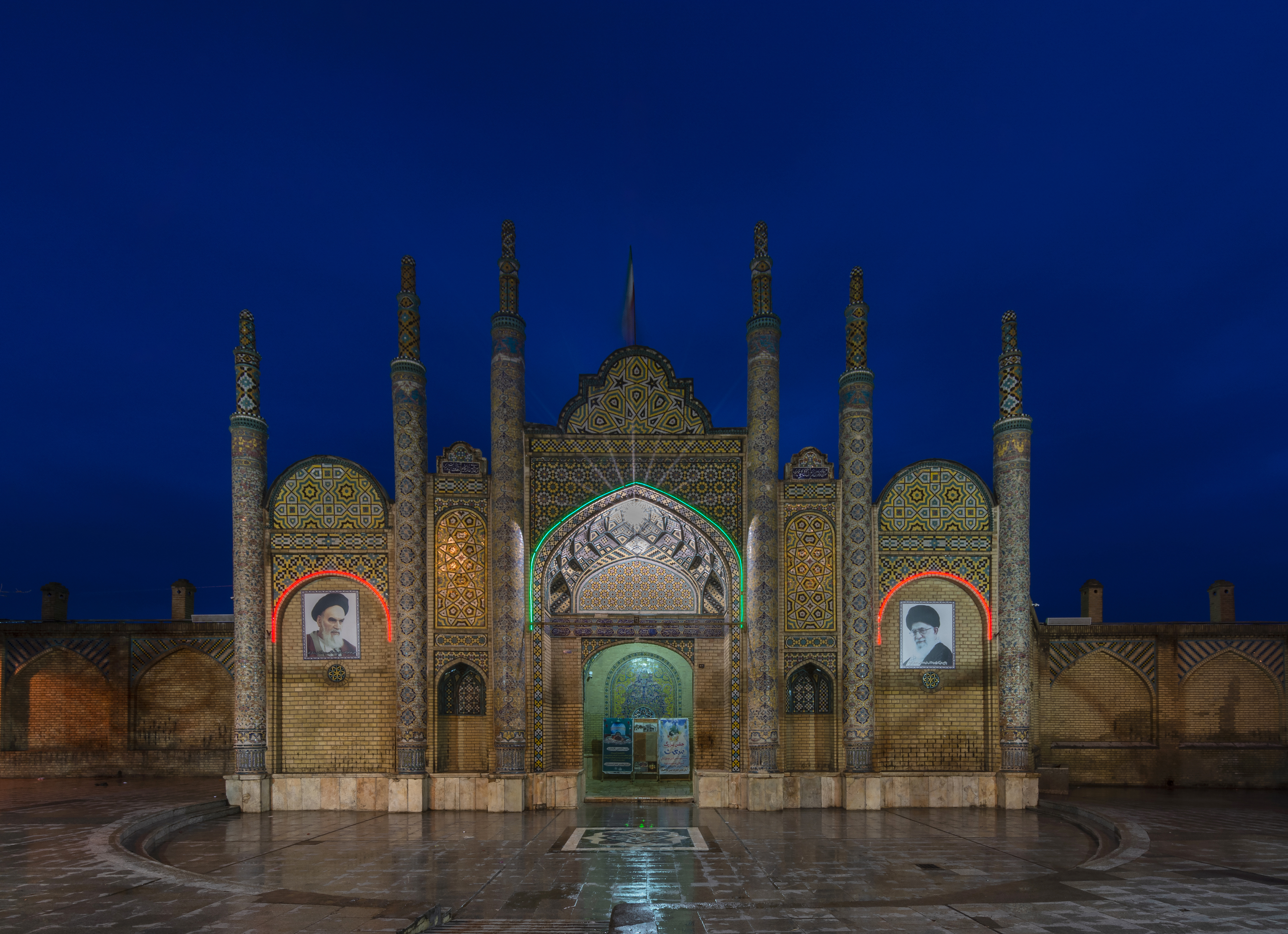

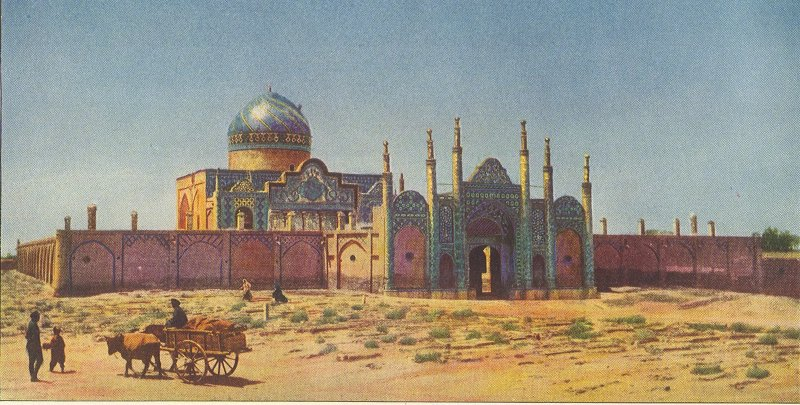

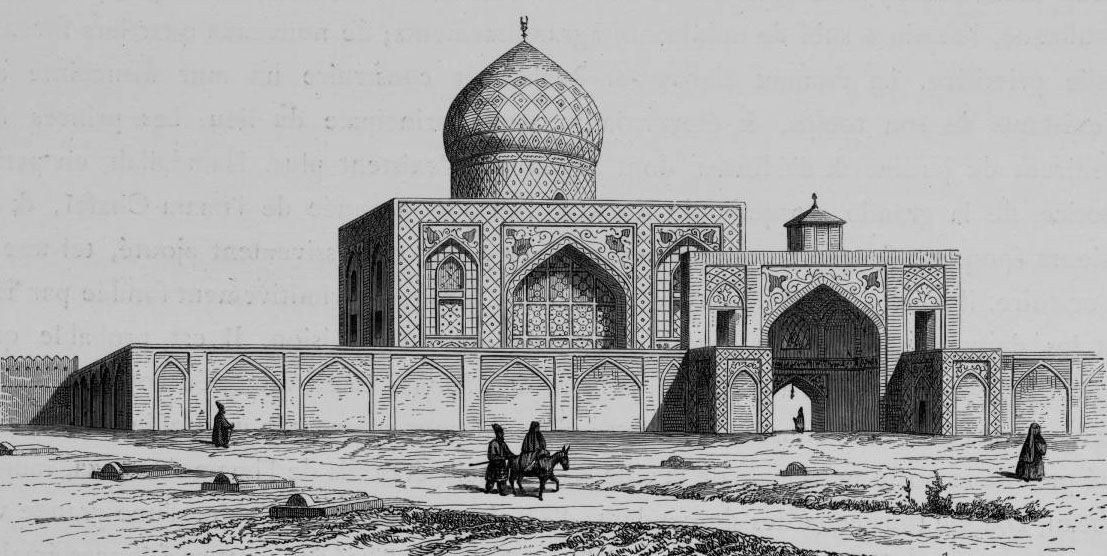

== See also ==
- Shia Islam in Iran
- List of imamzadehs in Iran
- List of mausoleums in Iran
