= Afushta'i Natanzi =

Poet and historian in Safavid Iran

Afushta'i Natanzi (Persian: افوشته‌ای نطنزی: c. 1539 – after 1599) was a poet and historian in Safavid Iran, who composed the historical chronicle Noqavat al-asar.

== Sources ==
- Ghereghlou, Kioumars (2020). "Afuštaʾi Naṭanzi, Maḥmud". Encyclopaedia Iranica Online. Brill. doi:10.1163/2330-4804_EIRO_COM_12110.
- Mitchell, Colin (2021). "Custodial politics and princely governance in sixteenth-century Safavid Iran". In Matthee, Rudi (ed.). The Safavid World. Routledge. pp. 79–110. ISBN 978-1138944060.
