= Qahqaheh Castle =

Iranian national heritage site

- قلعه قهقهه
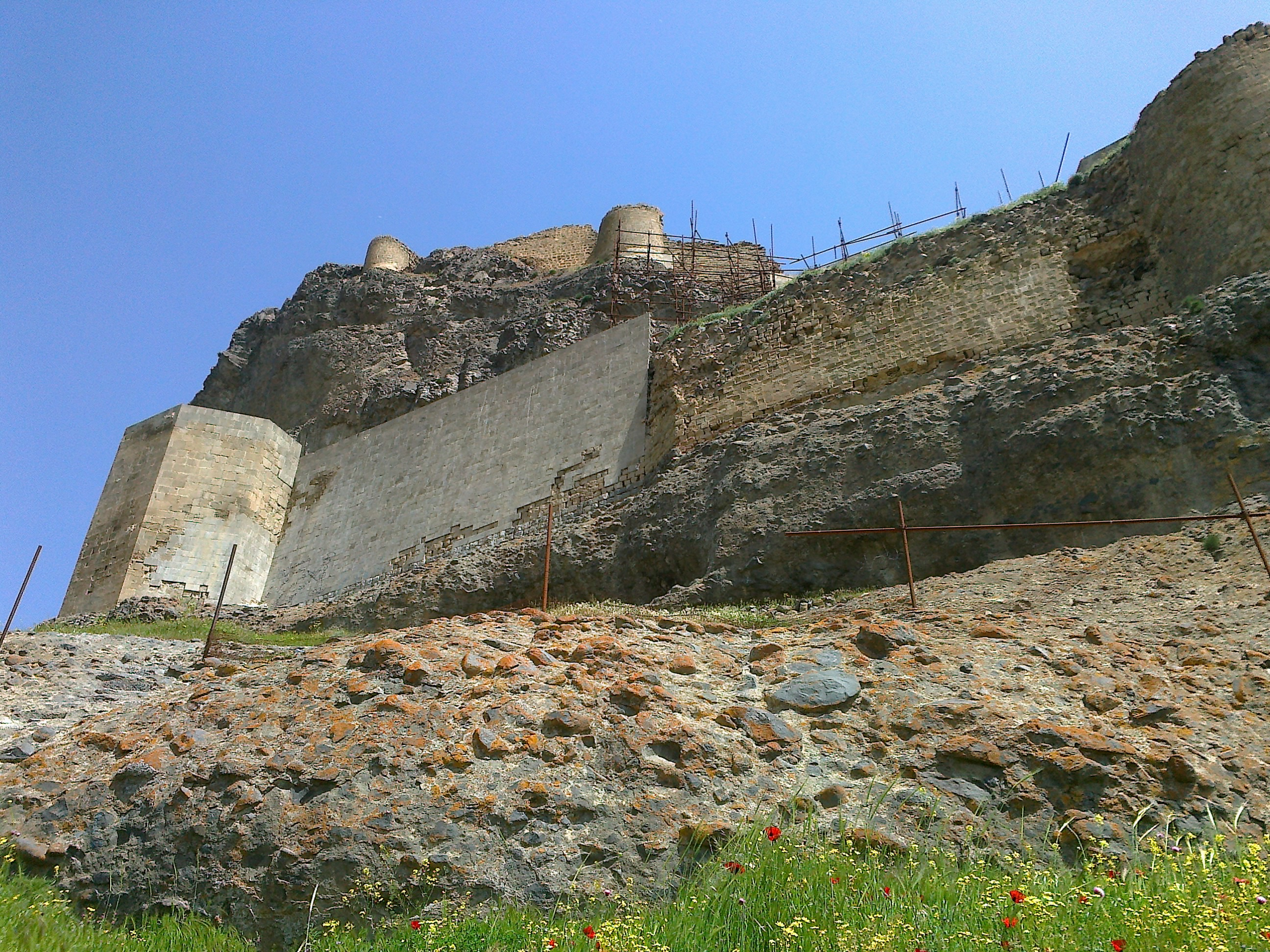
- Interactive map of the Qahqaheh Castle area

General information
- Type: Castle
- Location: Meshgin Shahr County, Iran

Qahqaheh Castle (Persian: قلعه قهقهه) is a castle in the mountains 85 kilometres (53 mi) from Meshginshahr in Ardabil Province, Iran. It was built and used as a jail for anti-government politicians during the Safavid dynasty. Ismail II, the third king of the Safavid dynasty, was imprisoned there.
