= Kioumars Ghereghlou =

Historian, librarian, and instructor

Kioumars Ghereghlou is the current curator for Middle East Collections at Stanford University, since September 2021. He is a historian, librarian and instructor by education. He priorly functioned as Bibliographic Assistant at Columbia University Libraries. From 2011 to 2017 he worked as Associate Research Scholar at the Center for Iranian Studies at Columbia University.

Ghereghlou acquired his BA in Iranian/Persian Languages and Literatures from the Ferdowsi University of Mashhad in 2000, and his MA and PhD in History from Shahid Beheshti University in Tehran in 2006. He also obtained a MLIS from Rutgers University–New Brunswick in 2021.

== Selected publications ==
A selection of Ghereghlou's work:

- Ghereghlou, Kioumars (2020). "A Forgotten Money Heist: The 1746 Mission of Nadir Shah's Chief Merchant in Russia Revisited". Iran: Journal of the British Institute of Persian Studies. 61: 130–147. doi:10.1080/05786967.2020.1829983. S2CID 228931430.
- Ghereghlou, Kioumars (2019). "A Safavid Bureaucrat in the Ottoman World: Mirza Makhdum Sharifi Shirazi and the Quest for Upward Mobility in the İlmiye Hierarchy". Journal of Ottoman Studies: 153–194. doi:10.18589/oa.631995. hdl:20.500.12723/2118. S2CID 211659249.
- Ghereghlou, Kioumars (2017). "Chronicling a Dynasty on the Make: New Light on the Early Ṣafavids in Ḥayātī Tabrīzī's Tārīkh (961/1554)". Journal of the American Oriental Society. 137 (4): 805–832. doi:10.7817/jameroriesoci.137.4.0805.
- Ghereghlou, Kioumars (2017). "On the margins of minority life: Zoroastrians and the state in Safavid Iran". Bulletin of the School of Oriental and African Studies. 80 (1): 45–71. doi:10.1017/S0041977X17000015.
- Ghereghlou, Kioumars (2015). A Chronicle of the Reign of Shah 'Abbas, by Fazli Beg Khuzani Isfahani. Gibb Memorial Trust. pp. 1–1148. ISBN 978-0906094495.
- Ghereghlou, Kioumars (2015). "Cashing in on land and privilege for the welfare of the shah: Monetisation of tiyūl in early Safavid Iran and eastern Anatolia" (PDF). Acta Orientalia Academiae Scientiarum Hungaricae. 68 (1): 87–141. doi:10.1556/aorient.68.2015.1.5.
