= History of Safavid Iran =

Safavid Iran (Note: /ˈsæfəvɪd, ˈsɑː-/) was one of the largest and longest-lasting Iranian empires, ruled by the Safavid dynasty from 1501 to 1736, albeit others place the end on the year 1722, when Isfahan fell to the Afghans.

== Founding of the dynasty by Shah Ismail I (r. 1501–1524) ==
=== Iran prior to Ismail's rule ===
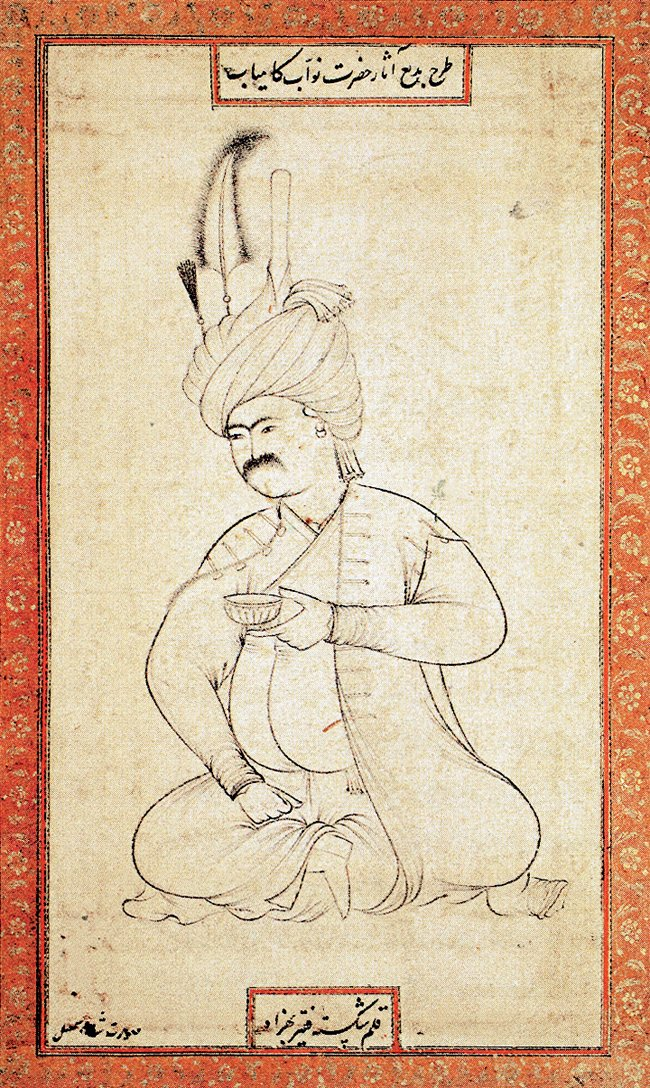
Portrait of Shah Ismail I, painted from life by Kamal al-din Behzad, his director of the royal atelier. (Note: Posthumous copy, as indicated by the note at the bottom edge of the image.) Topkapı Palace Museum, H.2169.

Following the decline of the Timurid Empire (1370–1506), Iran was politically fragmented, giving rise to numerous religious movements. The demise of Timur's political authority created a space in which several religious communities, particularly Shiʻi ones, could come to the fore and gain prominence. Among these were several Sufi brotherhoods, the Hurufis, Nuqtavis and the Musha'sha'i. Among these movements, the Qizilbash was the most politically resilient, and, owing to its success, Ismail I gained political prominence in 1501. There were many local states before the state established by Ismail. (Note: The writer Hasan Beg Rumlu documented the most important of them in his history work Ahsan al-tavarikh.) The most important local rulers about 1500 were:

- Huṣayn Bāyqarā, the Timurid sultan of Herat
- Alwand Mīrzā, Khan of the Aq Qoyunlu of Tabriz
- Murad Beg, Aq Qoyunlu ruler of Persian Iraq
- Farrokh Yaṣar, the Shirvanshah
- Badi Alzamān Mīrzā, local ruler of Balkh
- Huṣayn Kiyā Chalavī, the Kar-Kiya ruler of Semnan
- Murād Beg Bayandar, local ruler of Yazd
- Mahmud ibn Nizām al-Dīn Yahyá, Mihrabanid malek of Sistan
- Several local rulers of Mazandaran and Gilan, such as Bisotun II, Ashraf ibn Taj al-Dawla, Mirza Ali, and Kiya Husayn II.

Ismail was able to unite all these lands under his empire.

=== Rise of Shāh Ismail I ===
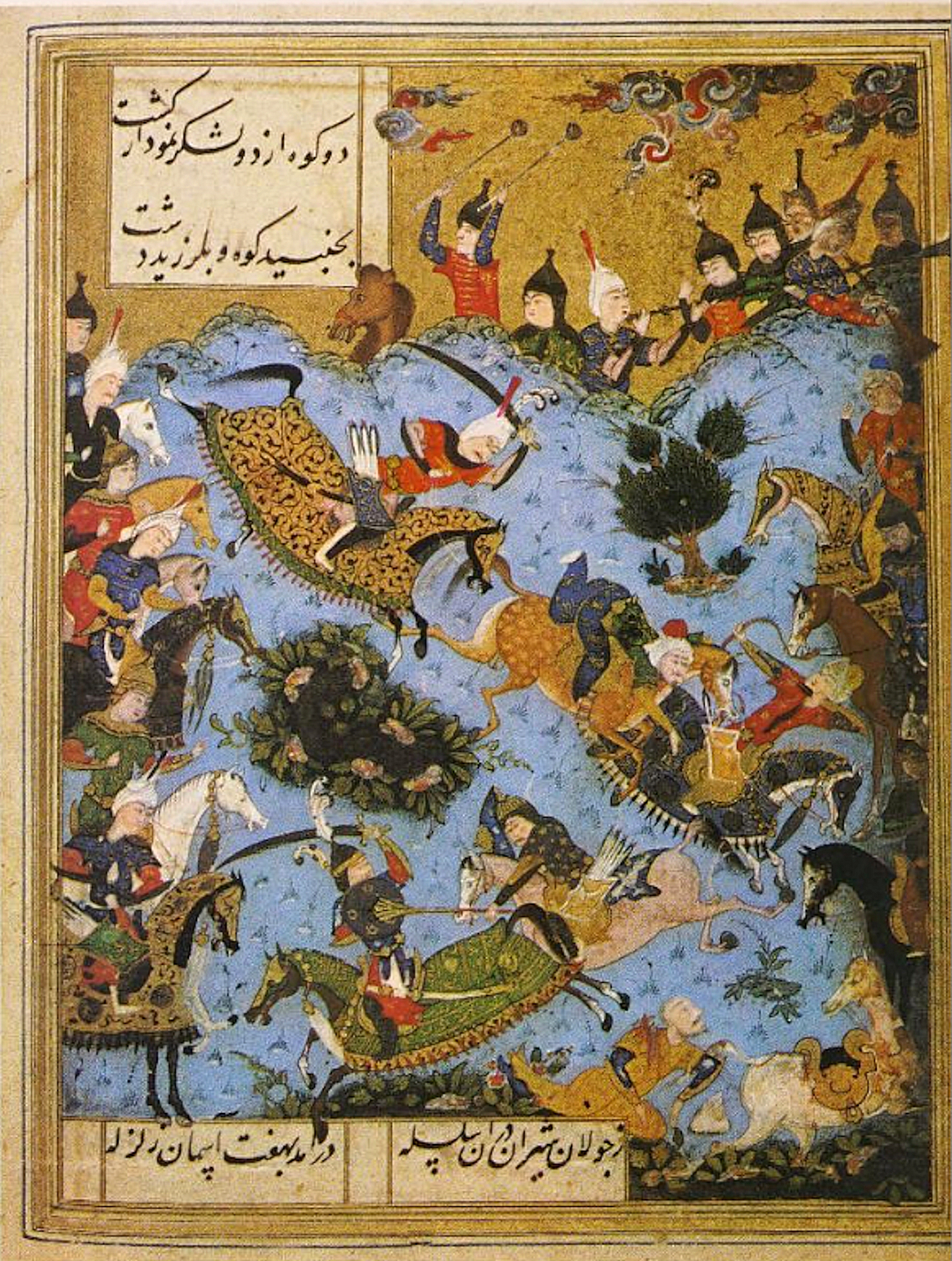
Shāh Ismaʿīl in the Safavid conquest of Shirvan (1501), according to the Shāhnāmah Shāh Ismaʿīl (Tabriz, 1541)

The Safavid dynasty was founded about 1501 by Shah Ismail I, the sheikh of Safavid order and a direct descendant of its eponymous founder, sheikh Safi ad-Din Ardabili. His background is disputed: Different historians have contending claims regarding the ethnic origin of Safi ad-Din. Hinz [de] states that he was Arab, Ayalon claims he was Turkic, Kasravi asserts he was Iranian, and Togan argues he was Kurdish but had completely Turkified by the time of Ismail. Gelvin and Lapidus also argue that he was of Kurdish origin. Savory and Gündüz [tr] have pointed out that the source text regarding Sheikh Safi al-Din's ethnic origin contains factual inaccuracies. According to Roemer [de], the Safavid Shah represented a lineage that combined both Turkmen and Iranian ancestry. Therefore, the question of whether the dynasty's founder, Sheikh Safi, was of Iranian, or seyyed descent is irrelevant. Due to the marriages of Safavid family with their dignitaries, Ismail also had Turkoman, Georgian and Pontic Greek ancestry. The language Ismail used is not identical with that of his "race" or "nationality" and he was bilingual from birth.

As such, he was the last in the line of hereditary grand masters of the Safaviyeh order, prior to its ascent to a ruling dynasty. Ismail was known as a brave and charismatic youth, zealous with regards to his faith in Shia Islam, and believed himself to be of divine descent – practically worshipped by his Qizilbash followers.

In 1500, Ismail I invaded neighboring Shirvan to avenge the death of his father, Sheik Haydar, who was murdered in 1488 by the Shah of Shirvan, Farrukh Yasar. Afterwards, Ismail went on a conquest campaign, capturing Tabriz in July 1501, where he enthroned himself the Shah of Azerbaijan, proclaimed himself King of Kings (shahanshah) of Iran and minted coins in his name, proclaiming Twelver Shi'ism as the official religion of his domain. The establishment of Twelver Shi'ism as the state religion of Safavid Iran led to various Ṣufi orders (tariqa) openly declaring their Shi'ite position, and others to promptly assume Shia Islam. Among these, the founder of one of the most successful Ṣufi orders, Shah Nimatullah Wali (died 1431), traced his descent from the first Ismaili Imam, Muhammad ibn Ismail, as evidenced in a poem as well as another unpublished literary composition. Although Shah Nimatullah was a Sunni Muslim, the future sheikhs of the Ni'matullāhī order declared adherence to Shia Islam after the rise of the Safavid dynasty.

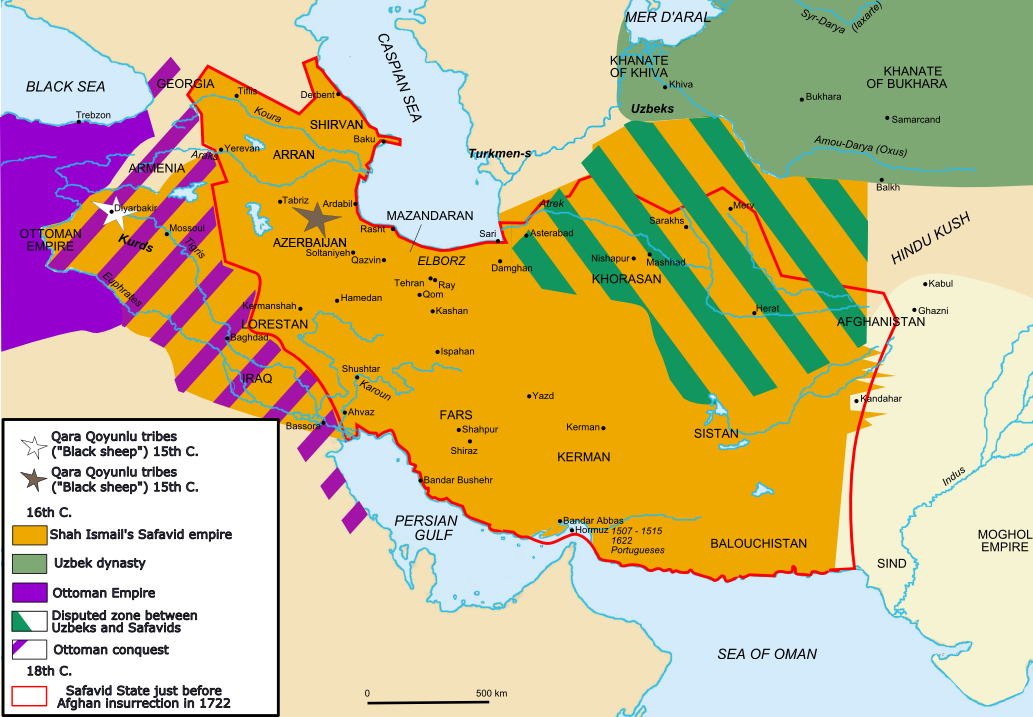
Extent of Shāh Ismāʻil's empire in West Asia

Although Ismail I initially gained mastery over Azerbaijan alone, the Safavids ultimately won the struggle for power over all of Iran, which had been going on for nearly a century between various dynasties and political forces. A year after his victory in Tabriz, Ismail I claimed most of Iran as part of his territory, and within 10 years established a complete control over all of it. Ismail followed the line of Iranian and Turkmen rulers prior to his assumption of the title "Padishah-i-Iran", previously held by Uzun Hasan and many other Iranian kings. The Ottoman sultans addressed him as the king of Iranian lands and the heir to Jamshid and Kai Khosrow.

Having started with just the possession of Azerbaijan, Shirvan, southern Dagestan (with its important city of Derbent), and Armenia in 1501, Erzincan and Erzurum fell into his power in 1502, Hamadan in 1503, Shiraz and Kerman in 1504, Diyarbakır, Najaf, and Karbala in 1507, Van in 1508, Baghdad in 1509, and Herat, as well as other parts of Khorasan, in 1510. In 1503, the kingdoms of Kartli and Kakheti were made his vassals as well. By 1511, the Uzbeks in the north-east, led by their Khan Muhammad Shaybani, were driven far to the north, across the Oxus River, where they continued to attack the Safavids. Ismail's decisive victory over the Uzbeks, who had occupied most of Khorasan, ensured Iran's eastern borders, and the Uzbeks never since expanded beyond the Hindu Kush. Although the Uzbeks continued to make occasional raids into Khorasan, the Safavid empire was able to keep them at bay throughout its reign.

=== Start of clashes with the Ottomans ===
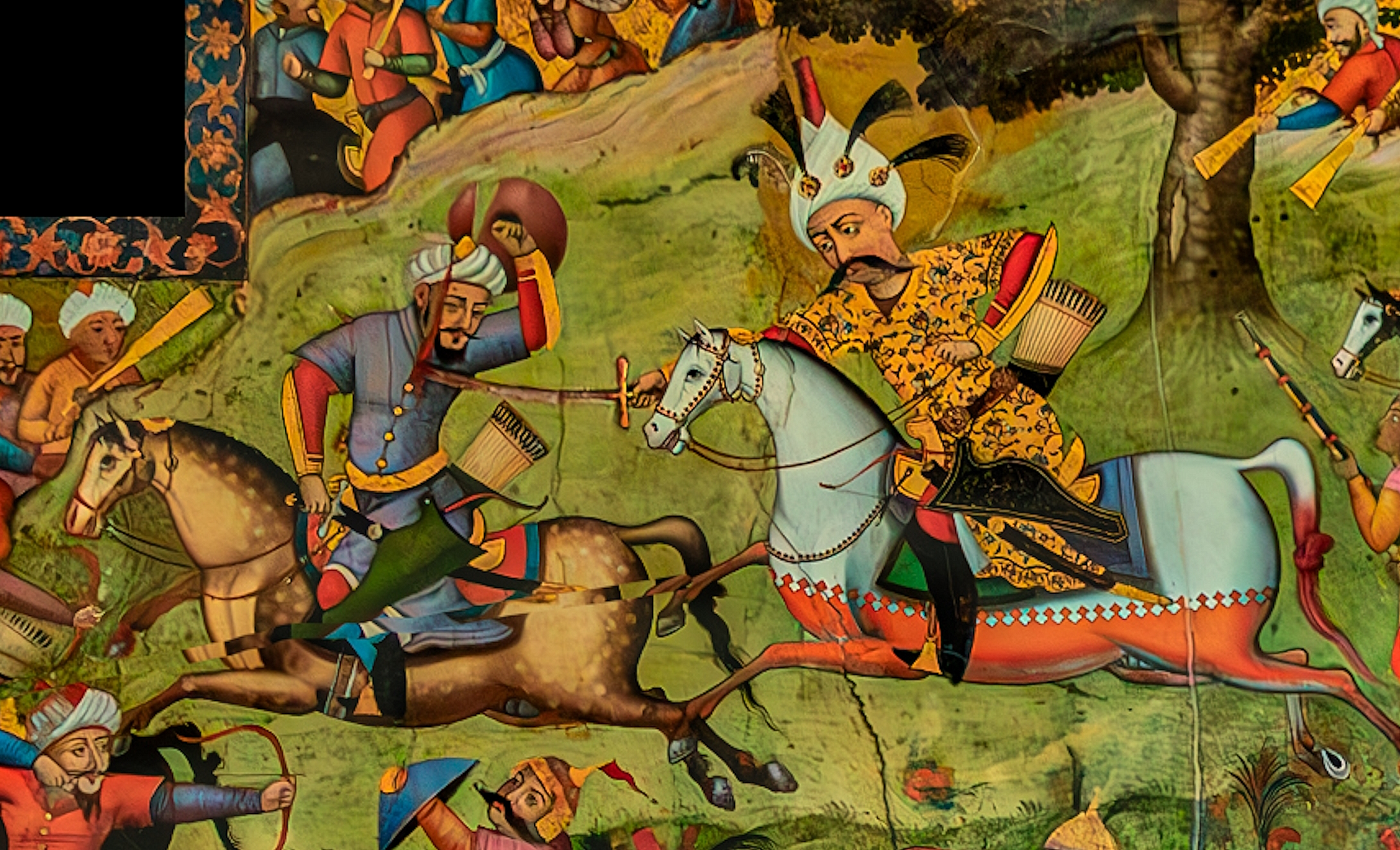
Battle of Merv between Shah Ismail (right) and Uzbek warlord Muhammad Shaybani Khan (left) in 1510. After the battle Ismail purportedly gilded the skull of Shaybani Khan for use as a wine goblet. Chehel Sotoun Palace, Isfahan, painted c. 1647.

More problematic for the Safavids was the powerful neighboring Ottoman Empire. The Ottomans, a Sunni dynasty, considered the active recruitment of Turkmen tribes of Anatolia for the Safavid cause as a major threat. To counter the rising Safavid power, in 1502, Sultan Bayezid II forcefully deported many Shiʻite Muslims from Anatolia to other parts of the Ottoman realm. In 1511, the Şahkulu rebellion was a widespread pro-Shia and pro-Safavid uprising directed against the Ottoman Empire from within the empire. Furthermore, by the early 1510s Ismail's expansionistic policies had pushed the Safavid borders in Asia Minor even more westwards. The Ottomans soon reacted with a large-scale incursion into Eastern Anatolia by Safavid ghazis under Nur-Ali Khalifa. This action coincided with the accession to the Ottoman throne in 1512 of Sultan Selim I, Bayezid II's son, and it was the casus belli leading to Selim's decision to invade neighbouring Safavid Iran two years later.

In 1514, Sultan Selim I marched through Anatolia and reached the plain of Chaldiran near the city of Khoy, where a decisive battle was fought. Most sources agree that the Ottoman army was at least double the size of that of Ismāʻil; furthermore, the Ottomans had the advantage of artillery, which the Safavid army lacked. According to historian Roger Savory, "Salim's plan was to winter at Tabriz and complete the conquest of Persia the following spring. However, a mutiny among his officers who refused to spend the winter at Tabriz forced him to withdraw across territory laid waste by the Safavid forces, eight days later". Although Ismail was defeated and his capital was captured, the Safavid empire survived. The war between the two powers continued under Ismail's son, Emperor Tahmasp I, and the Ottoman Sultan Suleiman the Magnificent, until Shah Abbas retook the area lost to the Ottomans by 1602.

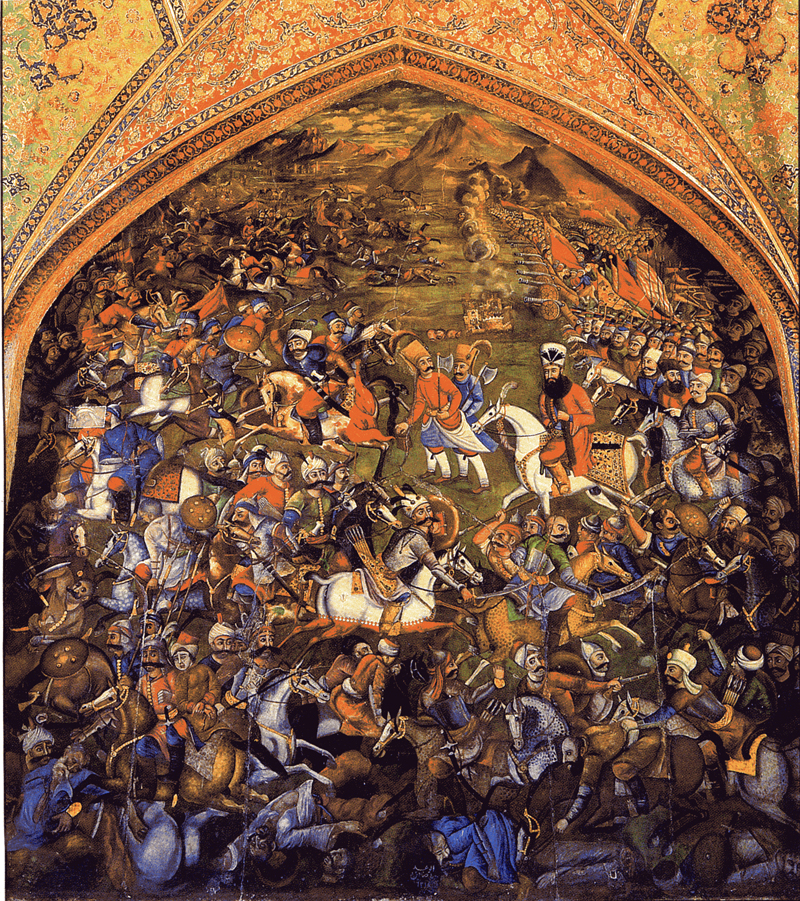
Artwork of the Battle of Chaldiran. Chehel Sotoun, painted in 1801–1802.

The consequences of the defeat at Chaldiran were also psychological for Ismail: the defeat destroyed Ismail's belief in his invincibility, based on his claimed divine status. His relationships with his Qizilbash followers were also fundamentally altered. The tribal rivalries among the Qizilbash, which temporarily ceased before the defeat at Chaldiran, resurfaced in intense form immediately after the death of Ismail, and led to ten years of civil war (930–040/1524–1533) until Shah Tahmasp regained control of the affairs of the state. For most of the last decade of Ismail's reign, the domestic affairs of the empire were overseen by the Tajik vizier Mirza Shah Hossein until his assassination in 1523. The Chaldiran battle also holds historical significance as the start of over 300 years of frequent and harsh warfare fueled by geo-politics and ideological differences between the Ottomans and the Iranian Safavids (as well as successive Iranian states) mainly regarding territories in Eastern Anatolia, the Caucasus, and Mesopotamia.

Early Safavid power in Iran was based on the military power of the Qizilbash. Ismail exploited the first element to seize power in Iran. But eschewing politics after his defeat in Chaldiran, he left the affairs of the government to the office of the wakil (chief administrator, vakil in Persian). Ismail's successors, most manifestly Shah Abbas I, successfully diminished the influence of the Qizilbash on the affairs of the state.

== Shah Tahmasp (r. 1524–1576) ==
=== Civil strife during Tahmasp's early reign ===
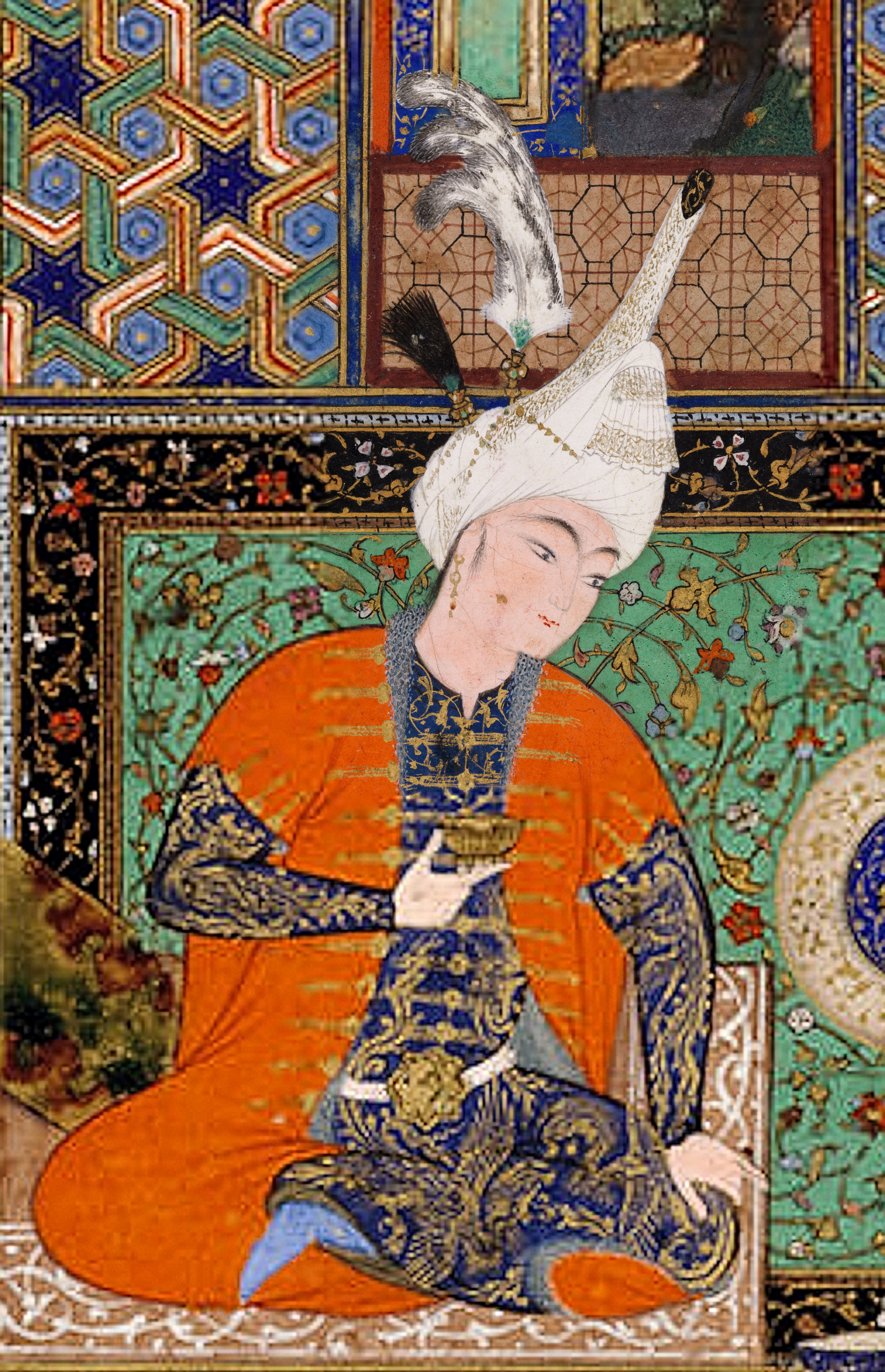
Shah Tahmasp I at his court in Tabriz, around 26 years old. Nighttime in a City, by Mir Sayyid Ali, c. 1540 (Sackler Museum, 1958.76).

Shāh Tahmasp, the young titular governor of Khorasan, succeeded his father Ismail in 1524, when he was ten years and three months old. The succession was evidently undisputed. Tahmasp was the ward of the powerful Qizilbash amir Ali Beg Rumlu (titled "Div Soltān Rumlu") who saw himself as the de facto ruler of the state. Rūmlū and Kopek Sultān Ustajlu (who had been Ismail's last wakīl) established themselves as co-regents of the young shah. The Qizilbash, which still suffered under the legacy of the battle of Chaldiran, was engulfed in internal rivalries. The first two years of Tahmasp's reign was consumed with Div Sultān's efforts to eliminate Ustajlu from power. This court intrigue lead directly to tribal conflict. Beginning in 1526 periodic battles broke out, beginning in northwest Iran but soon involving all of Khorasan. In the absence of a charismatic, messianic rallying figure like the young Ismail, the tribal leaders reclaimed their traditional prerogative and threatened to return to the time of local warlords. For nearly 10 years rival Qizilbash factions fought each other. Af first, Kopek Sultan's Ustajlu tribe suffered the heaviest, and he himself was killed in a battle.

Thus Div Soltān emerged victorious in the first palace struggle, but he fell victim to Chuha Sultan of the Takkalu, who turned Tahmasp against his first mentor. In 1527 Tahmasp demonstrated his desire by shooting an arrow at Div Soltan before the assembled court. The Takkalu replaced the Rumlu as the dominant tribe. They in turn would be replaced by the Shamlu, whose amir, Husain Khan, became the chief adviser. This latest leader would only last until 1534, when he was deposed and executed.

At the downfall of Husain Khan, Tahmasp asserted his rule. Rather than rely on another Turkmen tribe, he appointed a Persian wakīl. From 1553 for forty years the shah was able to avoid being ensnared in tribal treacheries. But the decade of civil war had exposed the empire to foreign danger and Tahmasp had to turn his attention to the repeated raids by the Uzbeks.

=== Foreign threats to the Empire ===
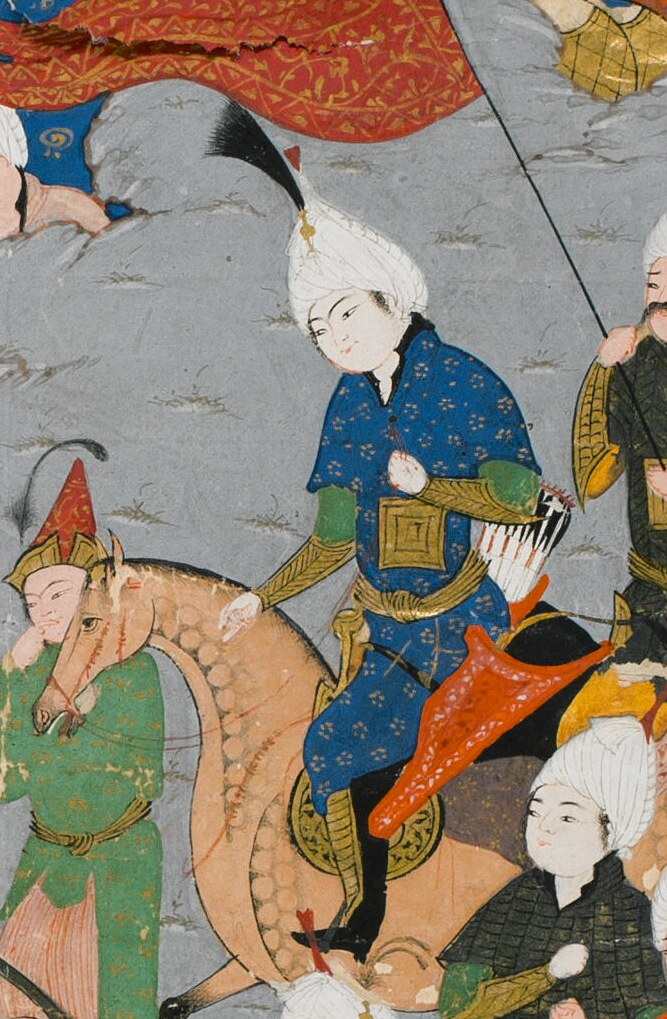
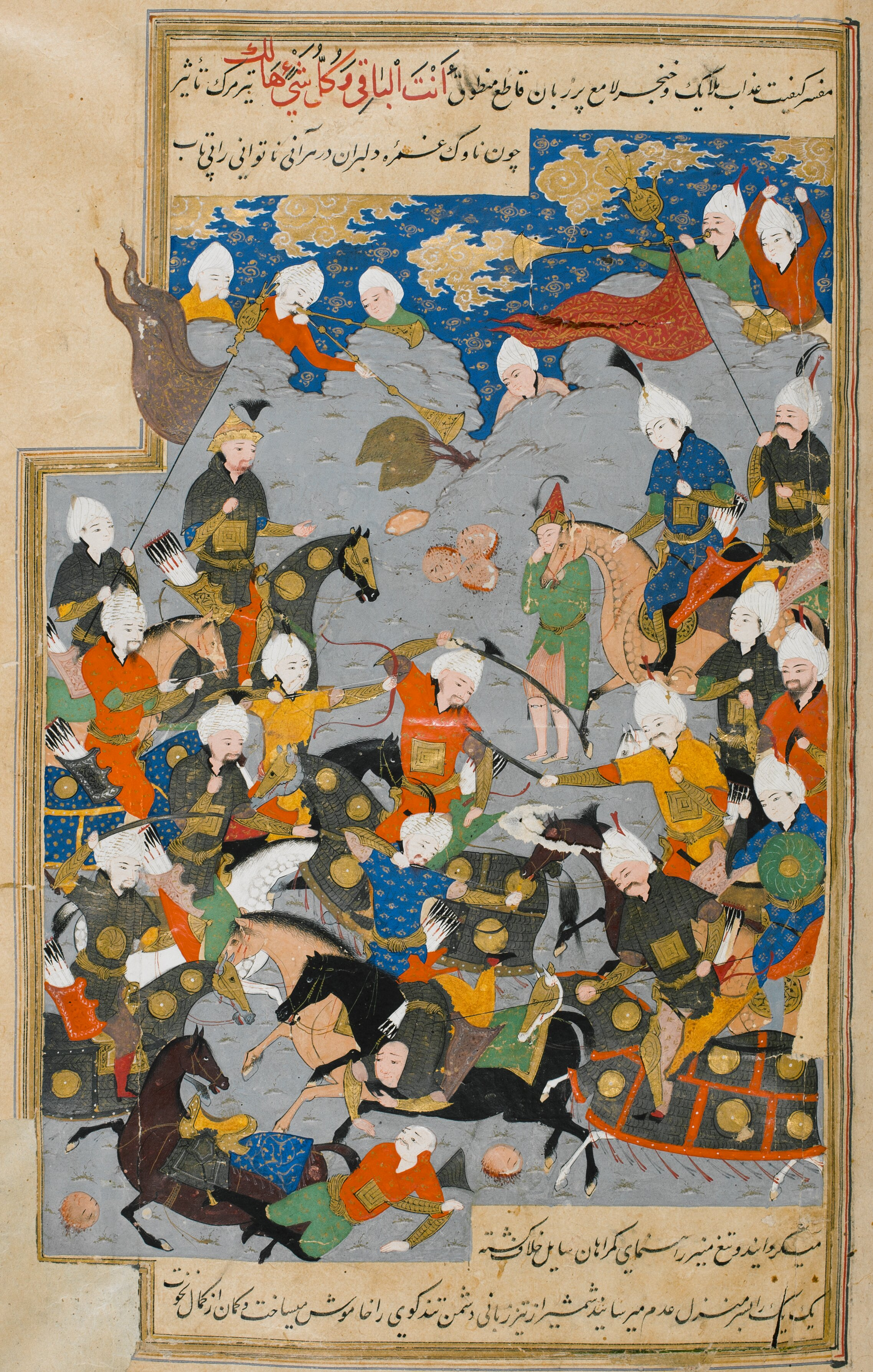
Shah Tahmasp I on horse, at the Battle between Tahmasp I and Ubayd Allah Khan on 24 September 1524. Kholāsat al-tavārikh by Ahmad Monshi Ghomi (painted in 1595)

The Uzbeks, during the reign of Tahmasp, attacked the eastern provinces of the kingdom five times, and the Ottomans under Soleymān I invaded Iran four times. Decentralized control over Uzbek forces was largely responsible for the inability of the Uzbeks to make territorial inroads into Khorasan. Putting aside internal dissension, the Safavid nobles responded to a threat to Herat in 1528 by riding eastward with Tahmasp (then 17) and soundly defeating the numerically superior forces of the Uzbeks at Jam. The victory resulted at least in part from Safavid use of firearms, which they had been acquiring and drilling with since Chaldiran.

Notwithstanding the success with firearms at Jam, Tahmasp still lacked the confidence to engage their archrivals the Ottomans, choosing instead to cede territory, often using scorched earth tactics in the process. The goal of the Ottomans in the 1534 and 1548–1549 campaigns, during the 1532–1555 Ottoman–Safavid War, was to install Tahmasp's brothers (Sam Mirza and Alqas Mirza, respectively) as shah in order to make Iran a vassal state. Although in those campaigns (and in 1554) the Ottomans captured Tabriz, they lacked a communications line sufficient to occupy it for long. Nevertheless, given the insecurity in Iraq and its northwest territory, Tahmasp moved his court from Tabriz to Qazvin.

In the gravest crisis of Tahmasp's reign, Ottoman forces in 1553–54 captured Yerevan, Karabakh and Nakhjavan, destroyed palaces, villas and gardens, and threatened Ardabil. During these operations an agent of the Samlu (now supporting Sam Mizra's pretensions) attempted to poison the shah. Tahmasp resolved to end hostilities and sent his ambassador to Soleyman's winter quarters in Erzurum in September 1554 to sue for peace. Temporary terms were followed by the Peace of Amasya in June 1555, ending the war with the Ottomans for the next two decades. The treaty was the first formal diplomatic recognition of the Safavid Empire by the Ottomans. Under the Peace, the Ottomans agreed to restore Yerevan, Karabakh and Nakhjavan to the Safavids and in turn would retain Mesopotamia (Iraq) and eastern Anatolia. Soleyman agreed to permit Safavid Shia pilgrims to make pilgrimages to Mecca and Medina as well as tombs of imams in Iraq and Arabia on condition that the shah would abolish the taburru, the cursing of the first three Rashidun caliphs. It was a heavy price in terms of territory and prestige lost, but it allowed the empire to last, something that seemed improbable during the first years of Tahmasp's reign.

=== Royal refugees: Bayezid and Humayun ===
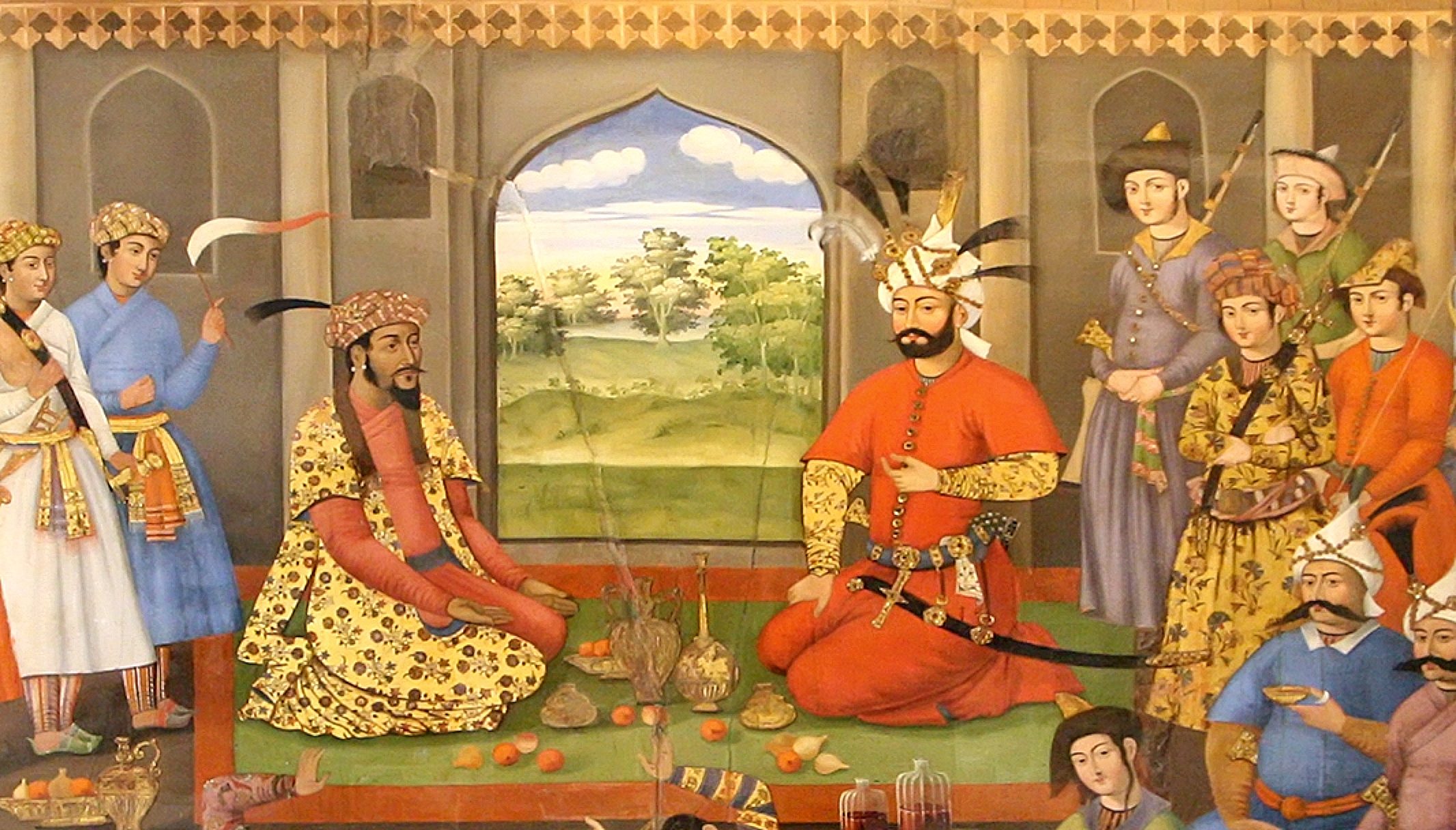
Encounter of Humayun (left) and Shah Tahmasp I (right) in Soltaniyeh in 1544. Chehel Sotoun Palace, Isfahan, painted circa 1647. Shah Tahmasp provided Humayun with 12,000 cavalry and 300 veterans of his personal guard along with provisions, so that his guest may recover his lost domains.

Almost simultaneously with the emergence of the Safavid Empire, the Mughal Empire, founded by the Timurid heir Babur, was developing in South-Asia. The Mughals adhered to Sunni Islam while ruling a largely Hindu population. After the death of Babur, his son Humayun was ousted from his territories and threatened by his half-brother and rival, who had inherited the northern part of Babur's territories. Having to flee from city to city, Humayun eventually sought refuge at the court of Tahmasp in Qazvin in 1543. Tahmasp received Humayun as the true emperor of the Mughal dynasty, despite the fact that Humayun had been living in exile for more than fifteen years. After Humayun converted to Shiʻi Islam (under extreme duress), Tahmasp offered him military assistance to regain his territories in return for Kandahar, which controlled the overland trade route between central Iran and the Ganges. In 1545 a combined Iranian–Mughal force managed to seize Kandahar and occupy Kabul. Humayun handed over Kandahar, but Tahmasp was forced to retake it in 1558, after Humayun seized it on the death of the Safavid governor.

Humayun was not the only royal figure to seek refuge at Tahmasp's court. A dispute arose in the Ottoman Empire over who was to succeed the aged Suleiman the Magnificent. Suleiman's favourite wife, Hürrem Sultan, was eager for her son, Selim, to become the next sultan. But Selim was an alcoholic and Hürrem's other son, Bayezid, had shown far greater military ability. The two princes quarrelled and eventually Bayezid rebelled against his father. His letter of remorse never reached Suleiman, and he was forced to flee abroad to avoid execution. In 1559 Bayezid arrived in Iran where Tahmasp gave him a warm welcome. Suleiman was eager to negotiate his son's return, but Tahmasp rejected his promises and threats until, in 1561, Suleiman compromised with him. In September of that year, Tahmasp and Bayezid were enjoying a banquet at Tabriz when Tahmasp suddenly pretended he had received news that the Ottoman prince was engaged in a plot against his life. An angry mob gathered and Tahmasp had Bayezid put into custody, alleging it was for his own safety. Tahmasp then handed the prince over to the Ottoman ambassador. Shortly afterwards, Bayezid was killed by agents sent by his own father.

=== Legacy of Shah Tahmasp ===
When the young Shah Tahmasp took the throne, Iran was in a dire state. But in spite of a weak economy, a civil war and foreign wars on two fronts, Tahmasp managed to retain his crown and maintain the territorial integrity of the empire (although much reduced from Ismail's time). During the first 30 years of his long reign, he was able to suppress the internal divisions by exerting control over a strengthened central military force. In the war against the Uzbeks he showed that the Safavids had become a gunpowder empire. His tactics in dealing with the Ottoman threat eventually allowed for a treaty which preserved peace for twenty years.

In cultural matters, Tahmasp presided the revival of the fine arts, which flourished under his patronage. Safavid culture is often admired for the large-scale city planning and architecture, achievements made during the reign of later shahs, but the arts of persian miniature, book-binding and calligraphy, in fact, never received as much attention as they did during his time.

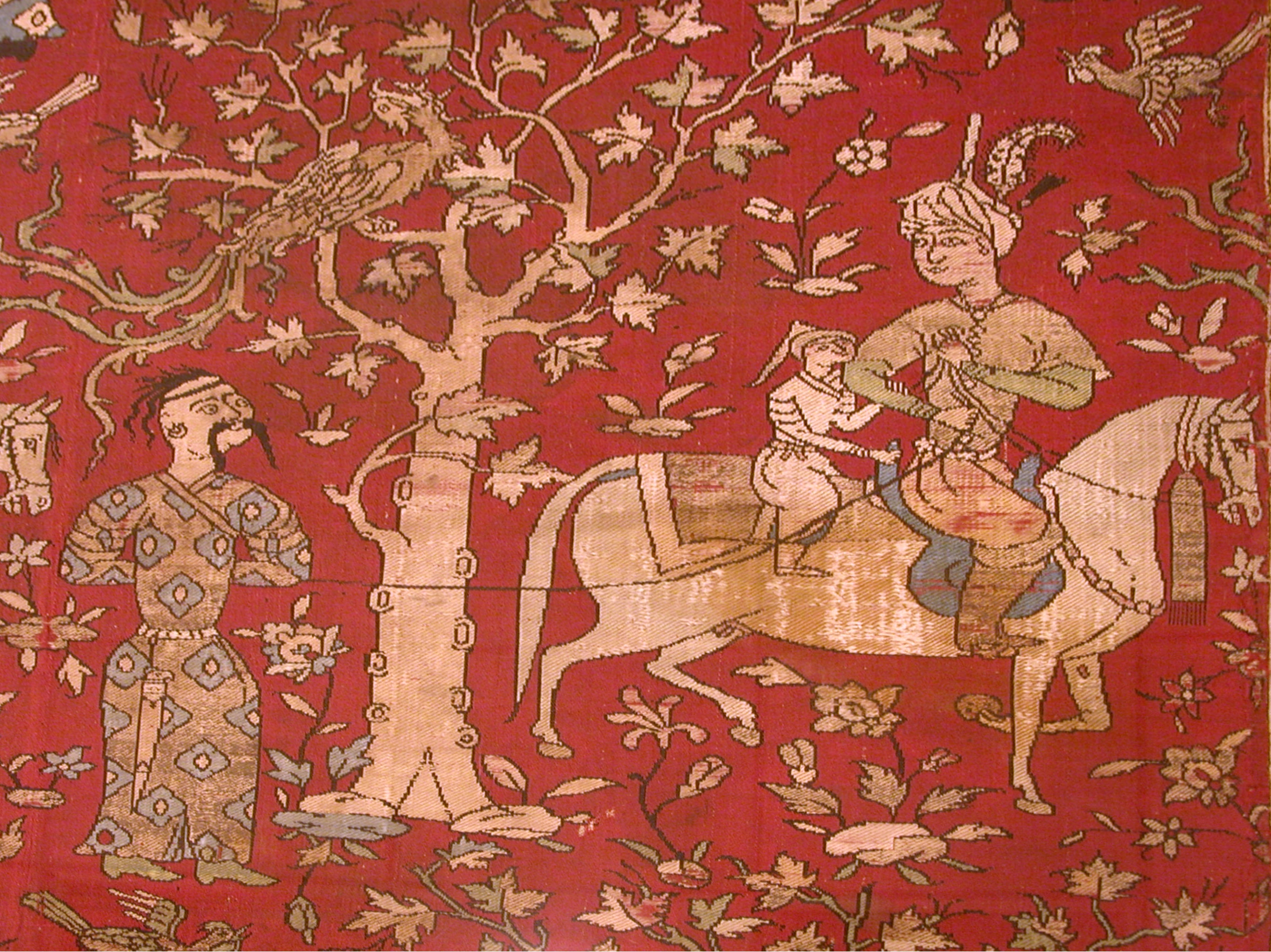
Safavid courtier leading Georgian captives in the military campaigns between 1540 and 1553. Tapestry of the mid-16th century.

Tahmasp also planted the seeds that would, unintentionally, produce change much later. During his reign he had realized while both looking to his own empire and that of the neighboring Ottomans, that there were dangerous rivalling factions and internal family rivalries that were a threat to the heads of state. Not taken care of accordingly, these were a serious threat to the ruler, or worse, could bring the fall of the former or could lead to unnecessary court intrigues. According to Colin Mitchell, for Tahmasp, the problem circled around the military tribal elite of the empire, the Qezelbāš, who believed that physical proximity to and control of a member of the immediate Safavid family guaranteed spiritual advantages, political fortune, and material advancement. Despite that Tahmasp could nullify and neglect some of his consternations regarding potential issues related to his family by having his close direct male relatives such as his brothers and sons routinely transferred around to various governorships in the empire, he understood and realized that any long-term solutions would mainly involve minimizing the political and military presence of the Qezelbāš as a whole. According to Encyclopædia Iranica, his father and founder of the Empire, Ismail I, had begun this process on a bureaucratic level as he appointed a number of prominent Persians in powerful bureaucratic positions, and one can see this continued in Tahmasp's lengthy and close relationship with the chief vizier, Qażi Jahan of Qazvin, after 1535. While Persians continued to fill their historical role as administrators and clerical elites under Tahmasp, little had been done so far to minimize the military role of the Qezelbāš.

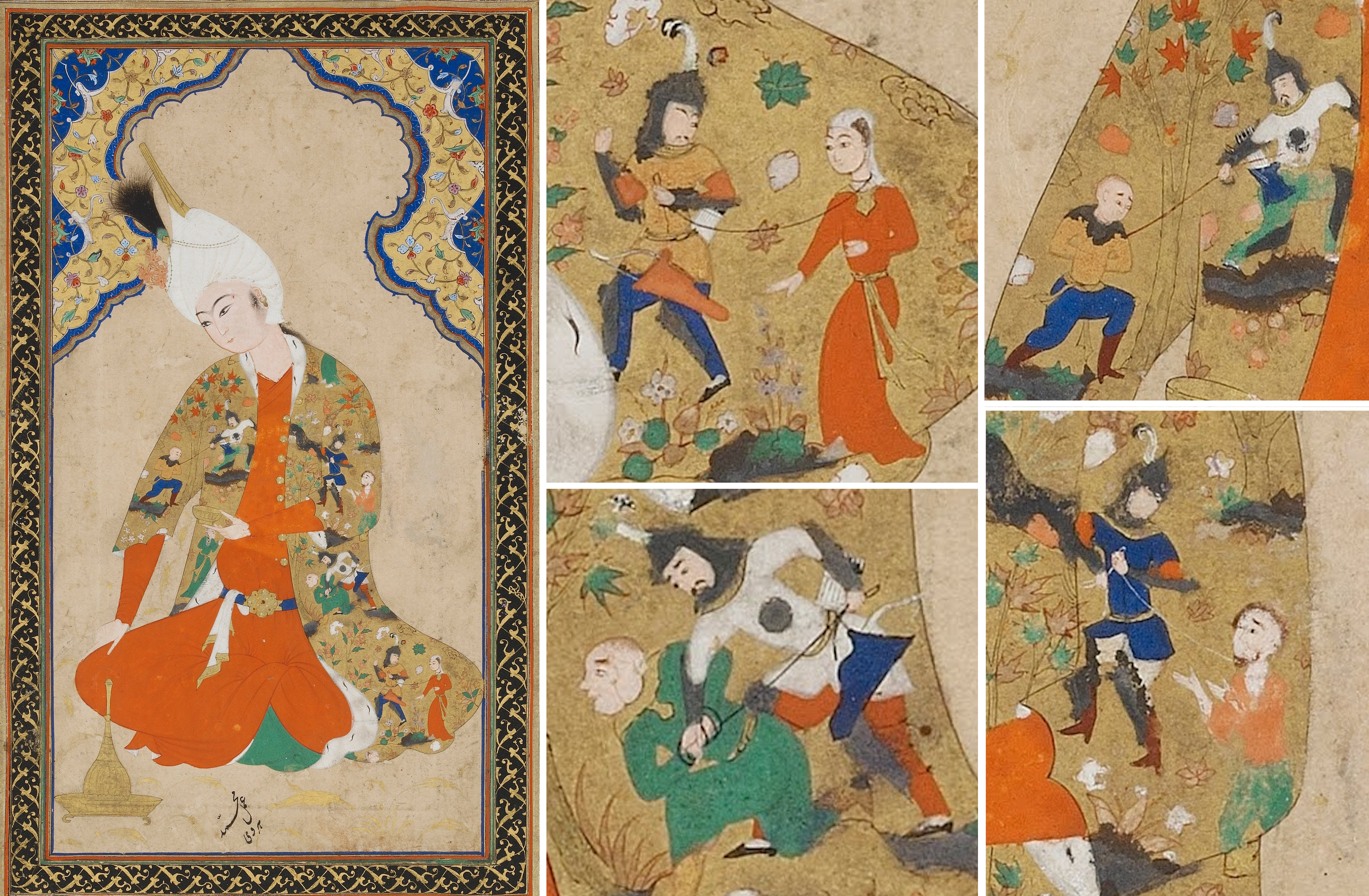
Young Safavid prince, wearing a coat with scenes of warriors taking both male and female Georgian prisoners. Painted by Muhammad Haravi, "art of the court of Shah Tahmasp", mid-16th century.

Therefore, in 1540, Shah Tahmasp started the first of a series of invasions of the Caucasus region, both meant as a training and drilling for his soldiers, as well as mainly bringing back massive numbers of Christian Circassian and Georgian slaves, who would form the basis of a military slave system, alike to the janissaries of the neighbouring Ottoman Empire, as well as at the same time forming a new layer in Iranian society composed of ethnic Caucasians. At the fourth invasion in 1553, it was now clear that Tahmasp followed a policy of annexation and resettlement as he gained control over Tbilisi (Tiflis) and the region of Kartli while physically transplanting more than 30,000 people to the central Iranian heartlands. According to Encyclopædia Iranica, this would be the starting point for the corps of the ḡolāmān-e ḵāṣṣa-ye-e šarifa, or royal slaves, who would dominate the Safavid military for most of the empire's length. As non-Turcoman converts to Islam, these Circassian and Georgian ḡolāmāns (also written as ghulams) were completely unrestrained by clan loyalties and kinship obligations, which was an attractive feature for a ruler like Tahmasp whose childhood and upbringing had been deeply affected by Qezelbāš tribal politics. In turn, many of these transplanted women became wives and concubines of Tahmasp, and the Safavid harem emerged as a competitive, and sometimes lethal, arena of ethnic politics as cliques of Turkmen, Circassian, and Georgian women and courtiers vied with each other for the shah's attention.

Although the first slave soldiers would not be organized until the reign of Abbas I, during Tahmasp's time Caucasians would already become important members of the royal household, Harem and in the civil and military administration, and by that becoming their way of eventually becoming an integral part of the society. One of Tahmasp's sisters married a Circassian, who would use his court office to team up with Tahmasp's daughter, Pari Khān Khānum to assert themselves in succession matters after Tahmasp's death.

After the Peace of Amasya, Tasmāsp underwent what he called a "sincere repentance." Tasmāsp at the same time removed his son Ismail from his Qizilbash followers and imprisoned him at Qahqaha. Moreover, he began to strengthen Shiʻi practice by such things as forbidding in the new capital of Qazvin poetry and music which did not esteem Ali and the Twelve Imams. He also reduced the taxes of districts that were traditionally Shiʻi, regulated services in mosques and engaged Shiʻi propagandists and spies. Extortion, intimidation and harassment were practiced against Sunnis.

When Tahmasp died in 984/1576, Iran was calm domestically, with secure borders and no imminent threat from either the Uzbeks or the Ottomans. What remained unchanged, however, was the constant threat of local disaffection with the weak central authority. That condition would not change (and in fact it would worsen) until Tahmasp's grandson, Abbas I, assumed the throne.

== Chaos under Tahmasp's sons ==
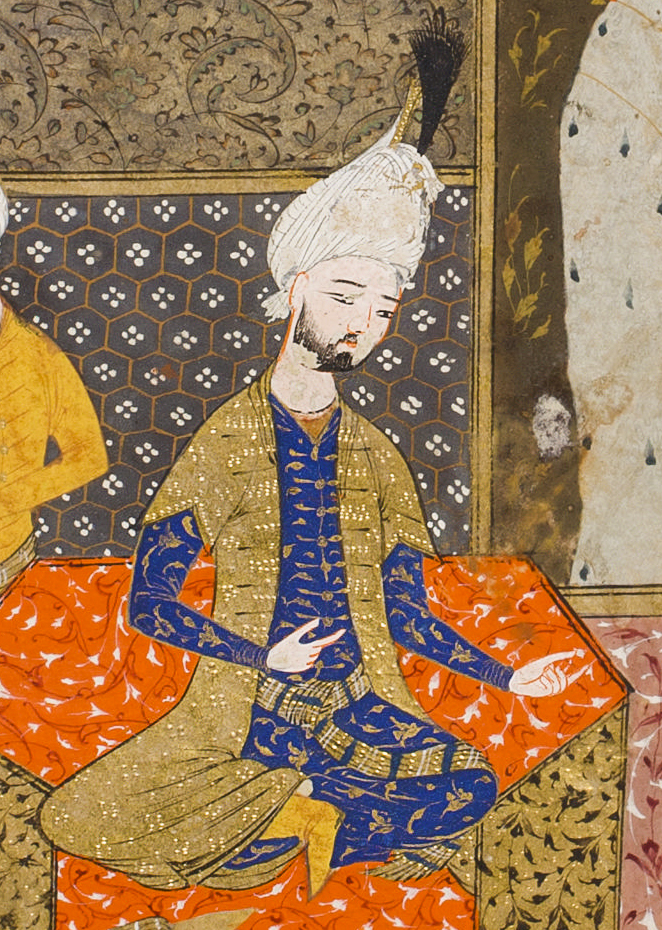
Shah Ismail II, from a 1587–1592 chronicle of Safavid history, Kholāsat al-tavārikh

On Tahmasp's death support for a successor coalesced around two of his nine sons; the support divided on ethnic lines—Ismail was supported by most of the Turkmen tribes as well as his sister Pari Khān Khānum, her Circassian uncle Shamkhal Sultan as well as the rest of the Circassians, while Haydar was mostly supported by the Georgians at court although he also had support from the Turkmen Ustajlu. Ismail had been imprisoned at Qahqaha since 1556 by his father on charges of plotting a coup, but his selection was ensured when 30,000 Qizilbash supporters demonstrated outside the prison. Shortly after the installation of Ismail II on August 22, 1576, Haydar was beheaded.

=== Ismail II (r. 1576–1577) ===
Ismail's 14-month reign was notable for two things: continual bloodletting of his relatives and others (including his own supporters) and his reversal on religion. He had all his relatives killed except for his older brother, Mohammad Khudabanda, who, being nearly blind, was not a real candidate for the throne, and Mohammad's three sons, Hamza Mirza, Abbas Mirza and Abu Talib Mirza. While the murderous actions of Ismail might be explained by political prudence (Ottoman sultans occasionally purged the bloodline to prevent succession rivals), his actions against Shi’a suggest retaliation against his father, who saw himself as a pious practitioner. Ismail sought to reintroduce Sunni orthodoxy. But even here there may have been practical political considerations; namely, "concern about the excessively powerful position of Shiʻi dignitaries, which would have been undermined by a reintroduction of the Sunna." His conduct might also be explained by his drug use. In any event, he was ultimately killed (according to some accounts) by his Circassian half-sister, Pari Khān Khānum, who championed him over Haydar. She is said to have poisoned his opium.

=== Mohammad Khodabanda (r. 1578–1587) ===
On the death of Ismail II there were three candidates for succession: Shah Shuja, the infant son of Ismail (only a few weeks old), Ismail's brother, Mohammad Khodabanda; and Mohammad's son, Sultan Hamza Mirza, 11 years old at the time. Pari Khān Khānum, sister of Ismail and Mohammad, hoped to act as regent for any of the three (including her older brother, who was nearly blind). Mohammad was selected and received the crown on February 11, 1579. Mohammad would rule for 10 years, and his sister at first dominated the court, but she fell in the first of many intrigues which continued even though the Uzbeks and Ottomans again used the opportunity to threaten Safavid territory.

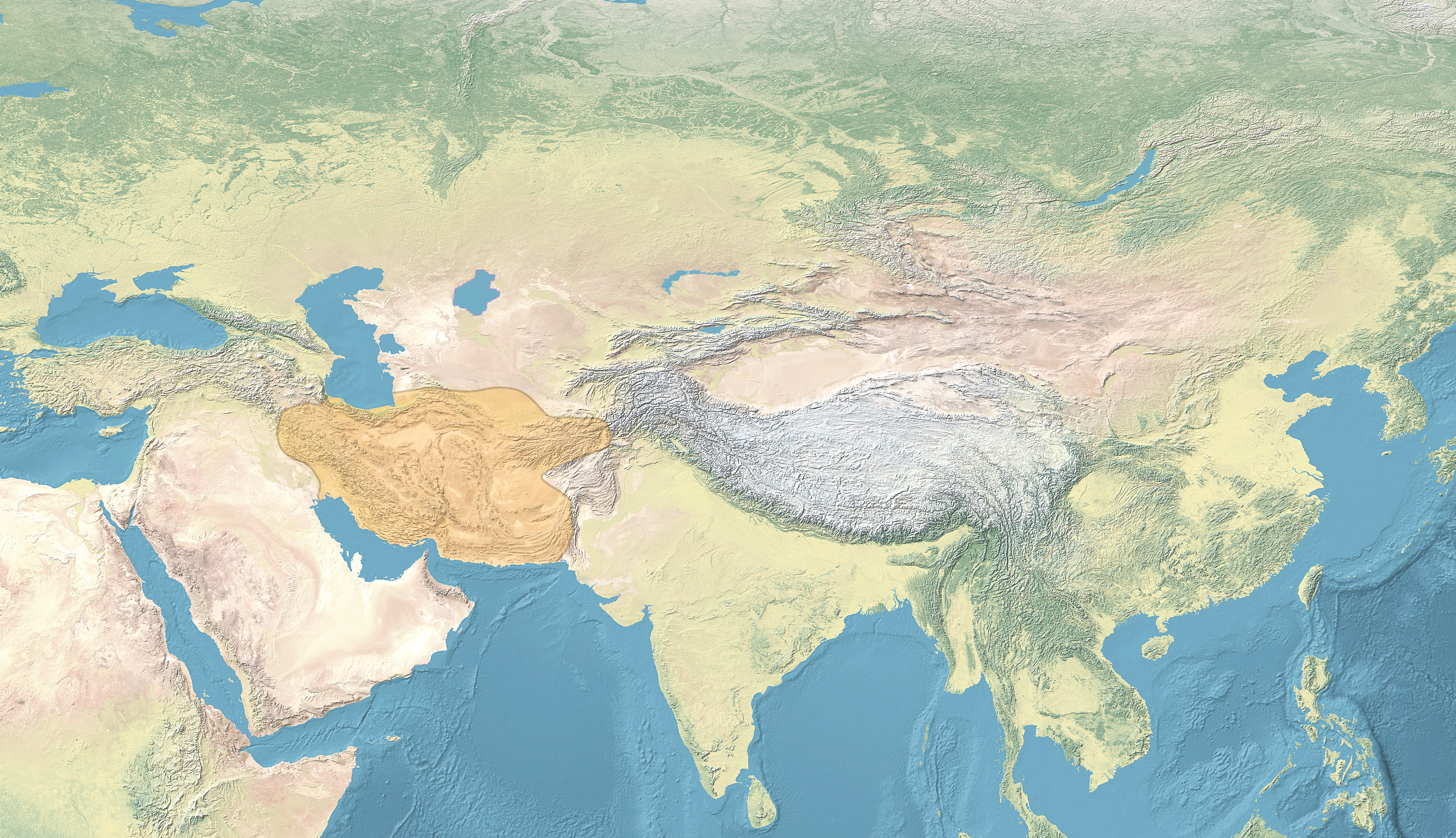
The Safavid Empire and contemporary Asian polities circa 1588

Mohammad allowed others to direct the affairs of state, but none of them had either the prestige, skill or ruthlessness of either Tahmasp or Ismail II to rein in the ethnic or palace factions, and each of his rulers met grim ends. Mohammad's younger sister, who had a hand in elevating and deposing Ismail II and thus had considerable influence among the Qizilbash, was the first. She did not last much longer than Mohammad's installation at Qazvin, where she was murdered. She was done in by intrigues by the vizier Mirza Salman Jaberi (who was a holdover from Ismail II's reign) and Mohammad's chief wife Khayr al-Nisa Begum, known as Mahd-i 'Ulyā. There is some indication that Mirza Salman was the chief conspirator. Pari Khān Khānum could master strong support among the Qizilbash, and her uncle, Shamkhal Sultan, was a prominent Circassian who held a high official position. Mirza Salman left the capital before Pari Khān Khānum closed the gates and was able to meet Mohammad Khodabanda and his wife in Shiraz, to whom he offered his services. He may have believed that he would rule once their enemy was disposed of, but Mahd-i 'Ulyā proved the stronger of the two.

She was by no means content to exercise a more or less indirect influence on affairs of state: instead, she openly carried out all essential functions herself, including the appointment of the chief officers of the realm. In place of the usual royal audience, these high dignitaries had to assemble each morning at the entrance to the women's apartments in order to receive the Begum's orders. On these occasions the royal edicts were drawn up and sealed.

The amirs demanded that she be removed, and Mahd-i Ulya was strangled in the harem in July 1579 on the ground of an alleged affair with the brother of the Crimean khan, Adil Giray, who was captured during the 1578–1590 Ottoman war and held captive in the capital, Qazvin. None of the perpetrators were brought to justice, although the shah lectured the assembled amirs on how they departed from the old ways when the shah was master to his Sufi disciples. The shah used that occasion to proclaim the 11-year-old Sultan Hamza Mirza (Mahd-i 'Ulyā's favorite) crown-prince.

The palace intrigues reflected ethnic unrest which would soon erupt into open warfare. Iran's neighbors seized the opportunity to attack. The Uzbeks struck in the Spring of 1578 but were repelled by Murtaza Quli Sultan, governor of Mashhad. More seriously the Ottomans ended the Peace of Amasya and commenced a war with Iran that would last until 1590 by invading Iran's territories of Georgia and Shirvan. While the initial attacks were repelled, the Ottomans continued and grabbed considerable territory in Transcaucasia, Dagestan, Kurdistan and Lorestan and in 993/1585 they even took Tabriz.

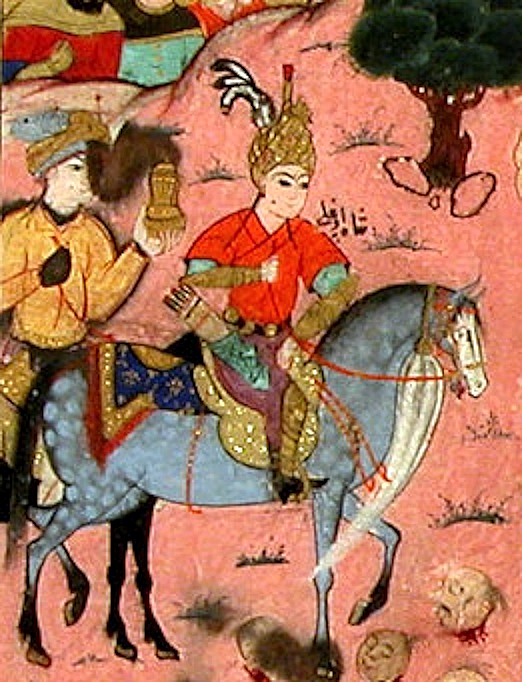
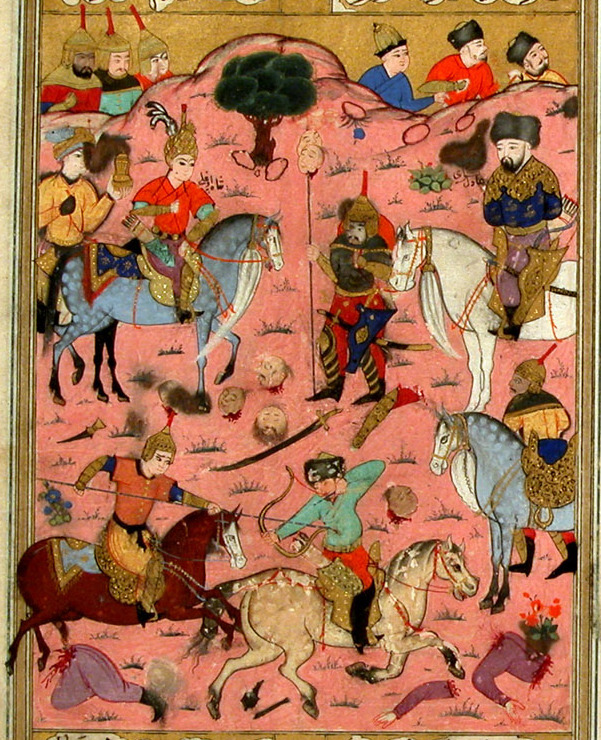
Prince Hamza Mirza (1568–86), son of Mohammad Khodabanda, defeating the Crimean Khanate army of Adil Giray at the Battle of Mollahasanli in 1578. Ottoman miniature of 1598

In the midst of these foreign perils, rebellion broke out in Khorasan fomented by (or on behalf of) Mohammad's son, Abbas. Ali Quli Khan Shamlu, the lala of Abbas and Ismail II's man in Herat proclaimed Abbas shah there April 1581. The following year the loyal Qizilbash forces (the Turkmen and Takkalu who controlled Qazvin), with vizier Mirza Salman and crown prince Sultan Hamza Mirza at their head, confronted the rebelling Ustajlu-Shamlu coalition which had assumed control of Khorasan under the nominal rule of young Abbas. The Ustajlu chief, Murshid Quli Khan, immediately acquiesced and received a royal pardon. The Shumlu leader, Ali Quli Khan, however, holed himself inside Herat with Abbas. The vizier thought that the royal forces failed to prosecute the siege sufficiently and accused the forces of sedition. The loyal Qizibash recoiled at their treatment by Mirza Salman, who they resented for a number of reasons (not least of which was the fact that a Tajik was given military command over them), and demanded that he be turned over to them. The crown prince (the vizier's son-in-law) meekly turned him over, and the Qizilbash executed him and confiscated his property. The siege of Herat thus ended in 1583 without Ali Quli Khan's surrender, and Khorasan was in a state of open rebellion.

In 1585 two events occurred that would combine to break the impasse among the Qizilbash. First, in the west, the Ottomans, seeing the disarray of the warriors, pressed deep into Safavid territory and occupied the old capital of Tabriz. Crown prince Hamza Mirza, now 21 years old and director of Safavid affairs, led a force to confront the Ottomans, but in 1586 was murdered under mysterious circumstances. In the east Murshid Quli Khan, of the Ustajlu tribe, managed to snatch Abbas away from the Shamlus. Two years later in 1587, the massive invasion of Khorasan by the Uzbeks proved the occasion whereby Murshid Quli Khan would make a play for supremacy in Qazvin. When he reached the capital with Abbas a public demonstration in the boy's favor decided the issue, and Shah Mohammad voluntarily handed over the insignia of kingship to his son, who was crowned Abbas I on October 1, 1588. The moment was grave for the empire, with the Ottomans deep in Iranian territory in the west and north and the Uzbeks in possession of half of Khorasan in the east.

== Shah Abbas (r. 1588–1629) ==
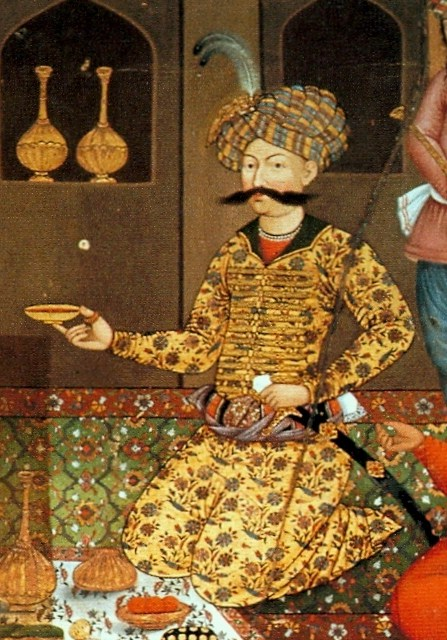
Abbas I (r.1587–1629) as shown on one of the paintings in the Chehel Sotoun pavilion, dated circa 1647.

The 16-year-old Abbas I was installed as nominal shah in 1588, but the real power was intended to remain in the hands of his "mentor," Murshid Quli Khan, who reorganized court offices and principal governorships among the Qizilbash and took the title of wakīl for himself. Abbas' own position seemed even more dependent on Qizilbash approval than Mohammad Khodabanda's was. The dependence of Abbas on the Qizilbash (which provided the only military force) was further reinforced by the precarious situation of the empire, in the vice of Ottoman and Uzbek territorial plunder. Yet over the course of ten years Abbas was able, using cautiously timed but nonetheless decisive steps, to affect a profound transformation of Safavid administration and military, throw back the foreign invaders, and preside over a flourishing of Persian art.

=== Restoration of central authority ===
Whether Abbas had fully formed his strategy at the onset, at least in retrospect his method of restoring the shah's authority involved three phases: (1) restoration of internal security and law and order; (2) recovery of the eastern territories from the Uzbeks; and (3) recovery of the western territories from the Ottomans. Before he could begin to embark on the first stage, he needed relief from the most serious threat to the empire: the military pressure from the Ottomans. He did so by taking the humiliating step of coming to peace terms with the Ottomans by making, for now, permanent their territorial gains in Iraq and the territories in the north, including Azerbaijan, Karabakh, Ganja, eastern Georgia (comprising the Kingdom of Kartli and Kakheti), Dagestan, and Kurdistan. At the same time, he took steps to ensure that the Qizilbash did not mistake this apparent show of weakness as a signal for more tribal rivalry at the court. Although no one could have bristled more at the power grab of his "mentor" Murshid Quli Khan, he rounded up the leaders of a plot to assassinate the wakīl and had them executed. Then, having made the point that he would not encourage rivalries even purporting to favor his interests, he felt secure enough to have Murshid Quli Khan assassinated on his own orders in July 1589. It was clear that Abbas' style of leadership would be entirely different from Mohammad Khodabanda's leadership.

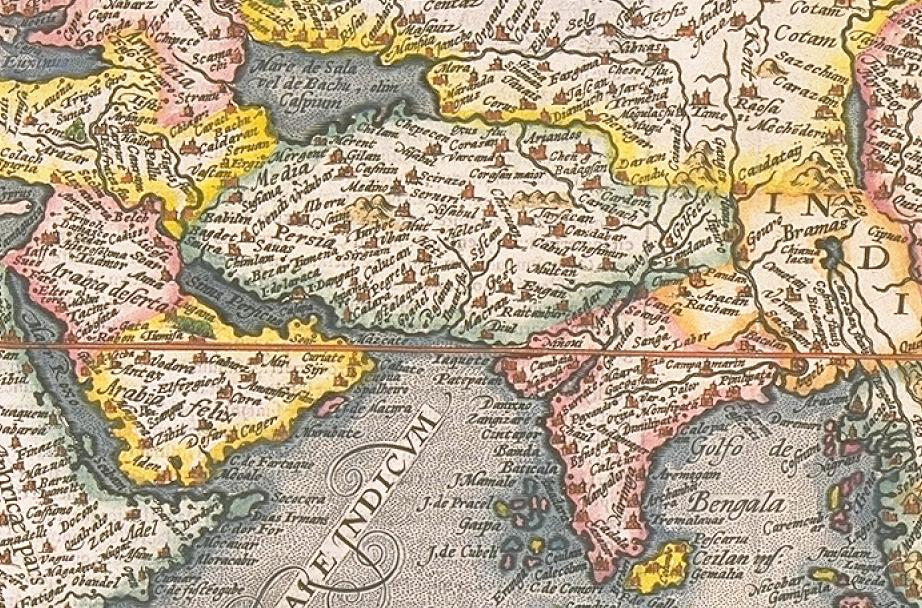
Safavid Persia, 1598

Abbas was able to begin gradually transforming the empire from a tribal confederation to a modern imperial government by transferring provinces from mamalik (provincial) rule governed by a Qizilbash chief and the revenue of which mostly supported local Qizilbash administration and forces to khass (central) rule presided over by a court appointee and the revenue of which reverted to the court. Particularly important in this regard were the Gilan and Mazandaran provinces, which produced Iran's single most important export; silk. With the substantial new revenue, Abbas was able to build up a central, standing army, loyal only to him. This freed him of his dependence on Qizilbash warriors loyal to local tribal chiefs.

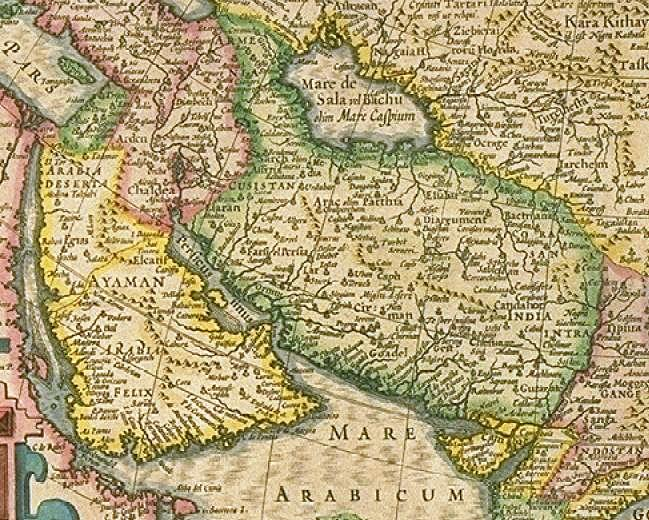
Safavid Persia, 1610

What effectively fully severed Abbas's dependence on the Qizilbash, however, was how he constituted this new army. In order not to favor one Turkic tribe over another and to avoid inflaming the Turk-Persian enmity, he recruited his army from the "third force", a policy that had been implemented in its baby-steps since the reign of Tahmasp I – the Circassian, Georgian and to a lesser extent Armenian ghulāms (slaves) which (after conversion to Islam) were trained for the military or some branch of the civil or military administration. The standing army created by Abbas consisted of: (1) 10,000–15,000 cavalry ghulām regiments solely composed of ethnic Caucasians, armed with muskets in addition to the usual weapons (then the largest cavalry in the world); (2) a corps of musketeers, tufangchiyān, mainly Iranians, originally foot soldiers but eventually mounted, and (3) a corps of artillerymen, tūpchiyān. Both corps of musketeers and artillerymen totaled 12,000 men. In addition the shah's personal bodyguard, made up exclusively of Caucasian ghulāms, was dramatically increased to 3,000. This force of well-trained Caucasian ghulams under Abbas amounted to a total of near 40,000 soldiers paid for and beholden to the shah.

Abbas also greatly increased the number of cannons at his disposal, permitting him to field 500 in a single battle. Ruthless discipline was enforced and looting was severely punished. Abbas was also able to draw on military advice from a number of European envoys, particularly from the English adventurers Sir Anthony Shirley and his brother Robert Shirley, who arrived in 1598 as envoys from the Earl of Essex on an unofficial mission to induce Iran into an anti-Ottoman alliance. As mentioned by the Encyclopaedia Iranica, lastly, from 1600 onwards, the Safavid statesman Allahverdi Khan, in conjunction with Robert Sherley, undertook further reorganizations of the army, which meant among other things further dramatically increasing the number of ghulams to 25,000.

Abbas also moved the capital to Isfahan, deeper into central Iran. Abbas I built a new city next to the ancient Persian one. From this time the state began to take on a more Persian character. The Safavids ultimately succeeded in establishing a new Persian national monarchy.

=== Recovery of territory from the Uzbeks and the Ottomans ===
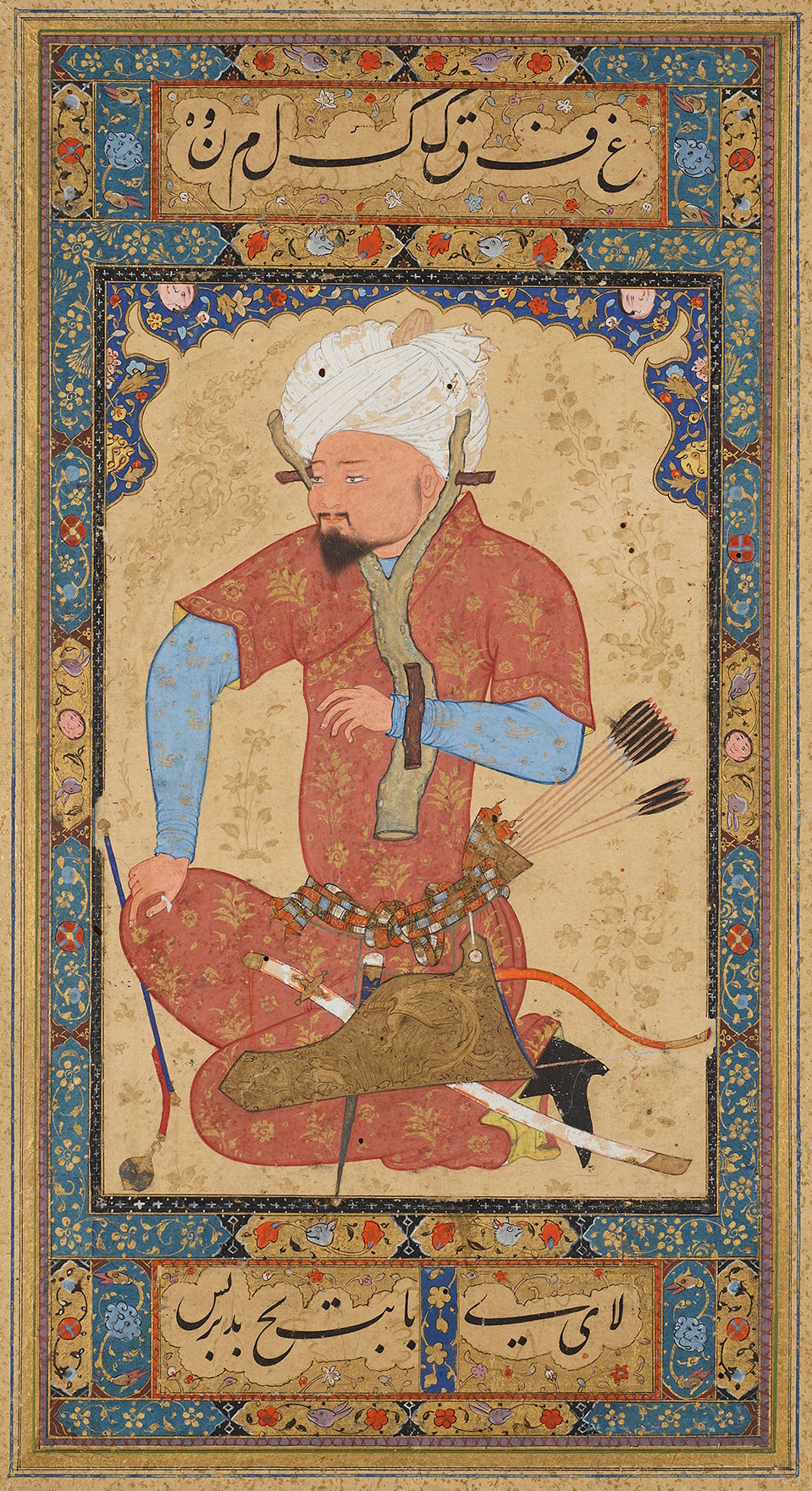
An Uzbek prisoner. Manuscript commissioned by Husain Khan Shamlu, Herat, ca. 1600.

Abbas I first fought the Uzbeks, recapturing Herat and Mashhad in 1598. Then he turned against Iran's archrival, the Ottomans, recapturing Baghdad, eastern Iraq and the Caucasian provinces by 1616, all through the 1603–1618, marking the first grand Safavid pitched victory over the Ottomans. He also used his new force to dislodge the Portuguese from Bahrain (1602) and, with English help, from Hormuz (1622), in the Persian Gulf (a vital link in Portuguese trade with India). He expanded commercial links with the English East India Company and the Dutch East India Company. Thus Abbas was able to break dependence on the Qizilbash for military might indefinitely, and therefore was able to fully centralize control for the first time since the foundation of the Safavid state.

The Ottoman Turks and Safavids fought over the fertile plains of Iraq for more than 150 years. The capture of Baghdad by Ismail I in 1509 was only followed by its loss to the Ottoman Sultan Suleiman I in 1534. After subsequent campaigns, the Safavids recaptured Baghdad in 1624 during the Ottoman–Safavid War (1623–39) yet lost it again to Murad IV in 1638 after Abbas had died. Henceforth a treaty, signed in Qasr-e Shirin known as the Treaty of Zuhab was established delineating a border between Iran and Turkey in 1639, a border which still stands in northwest Iran/southeast Turkey. The 150-year tug-of-war accentuated the Sunni and Shia rift in Iraq.

=== Quelling the Georgian uprising ===
In 1614–1616 during the Ottoman–Safavid War (1603–1618), Abbas suppressed a rebellion led by his formerly most loyal Georgian subjects Luarsab II and Teimuraz I (also known as Tahmuras Khan) in the Kingdom of Kakheti. In 1613, Abbas had appointed these trusted Georgian gholams of his on the puppet thrones of Kartli and Kakheti, the Iranian Safavid ruled areas of Georgia. Later that year, when the shah summoned them to join him on a hunting expedition in Mazandaran, they did not show up due to the fear they would be either imprisoned or killed. Ultimately forming an alliance, the two sought refuge with the Ottoman forces in Ottoman ruled Imereti. This defection of two of the shah's most trusted subjects and gholams infuriated the shah, as reported by the Safavid court historian Iskandar Beg Munshi.

The following spring in 1614, Abbas I appointed a grandson of Alexander II of Imereti to the throne of Kartli, Jesse of Kakheti also known as "Isā Khān". Raised at the court in Isfahan and a Muslim, he was fully loyal to the shah. Subsequently, the shah marched upon Grem, the capital of Imereti, and punished its peoples for harbouring his defected subjects. He returned to Kartli, and in two punitive campaigns he devastated Tbilisi, killed 60–70,000 Kakheti Georgian peasants, and deported between 130,000 and 200,000 Georgian captives to mainland Iran. After fully securing the region, he executed the rebellious Luarsab II of Kartli and later had the Georgian queen Ketevan, who had been sent to the shah as negotiator, tortured to death when she refused to renounce Christianity, in an act of revenge for the recalcitrance of Teimuraz. Kakheti lost two-thirds of its population in these years by Abbas' punitive campaign. The majority were deported to Iran, while some were slaughtered.

Teimuraz returned to eastern Georgia in 1615 and defeated a Safavid force. It was just a brief setback, however, as Abbas had already been making long-term plans to prevent further incursions. He was eventually successful in making the eastern Georgian territories an integral part of the Safavid provinces. In 1619 he appointed the loyal Simon II (or Semayun Khan) on the symbolic throne of Kakheti, while placing a series of his own governors to rule of districts where rebellious inhabitants were mostly located. Moreover, he planned to deport all nobles of Kartli. Iranian rule had been fully restored over eastern Georgia, but the Georgian territories would continue to produce resistance to Safavid enroachments from 1624 until Abbas' death.

=== Suppressing the Kurdish rebellion ===
In 1609–10, a war broke out between Kurdish tribes and the Safavid Empire. After a long and bloody siege led by the Safavid grand vizier Hatem Beg, which lasted from November 1609 to the summer of 1610, the Kurdish stronghold of Dimdim was captured. Shah Abbas ordered a general massacre in Beradost and Mukriyan (Mahabad, reported by Eskandar Beg Monshi, Safavid Historian (1557–1642), in "Alam Ara Abbasi") and resettled the Turkic Afshar tribe in the region while deporting many Kurdish tribes to Khorasan. Nowadays, there is a community of nearly 1.7 million people who are descendants of the tribes deported from Kurdistan to Khorasan (Northeastern Iran) by the Safavids.

=== Contacts with Europe during Abbas's reign ===
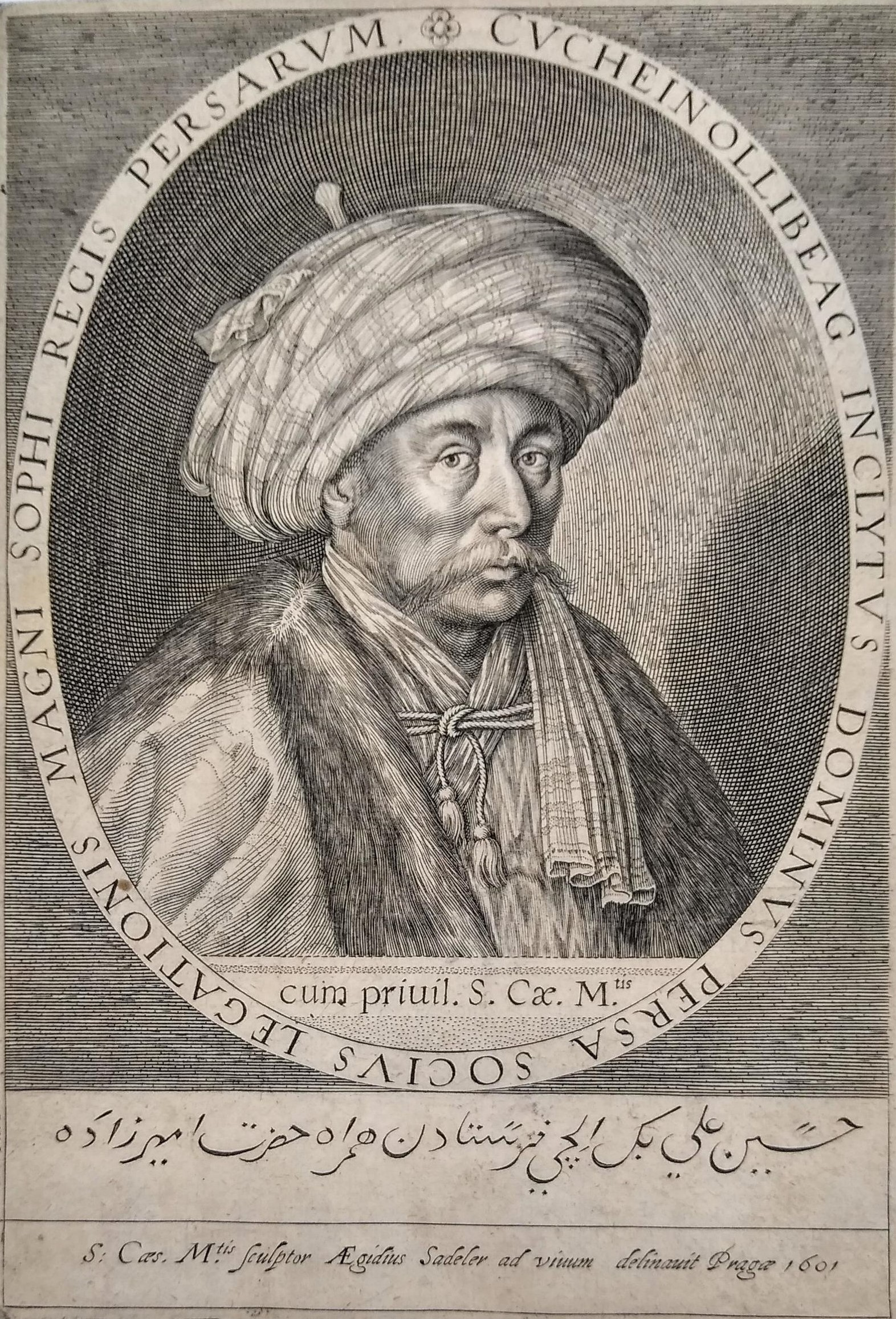
The ambassador Husain Ali Beg led the first Persian embassy to Europe (1599–1602).

Abbas's tolerance towards Christians was part of his policy of establishing diplomatic links with European powers to try to enlist their help in the fight against their common enemy, the Ottoman Empire. The idea of such an anti-Ottoman alliance was not a new one – over a century before, Uzun Hassan, then ruler of part of Iran, had asked the Venetians for military aid – but none of the Safavids had made diplomatic overtures to Europe. Shah Ismail I was the first of the Safavids to try to establish once again an alliance against the common Ottoman enemy through the earlier stages of the Habsburg–Persian alliance, but this also proved to be largely unfruitful during his reign. Abbas's attitude, however, was in marked contrast to that of his grandfather, Tahmasp I, who had expelled the English traveller Anthony Jenkinson from his court on hearing he was a Christian. For his part, Abbas declared that he "preferred the dust from the shoe soles of the lowest Christian to the highest Ottoman personage." Abbas would take active and all measures needed in order to seal the alliances.

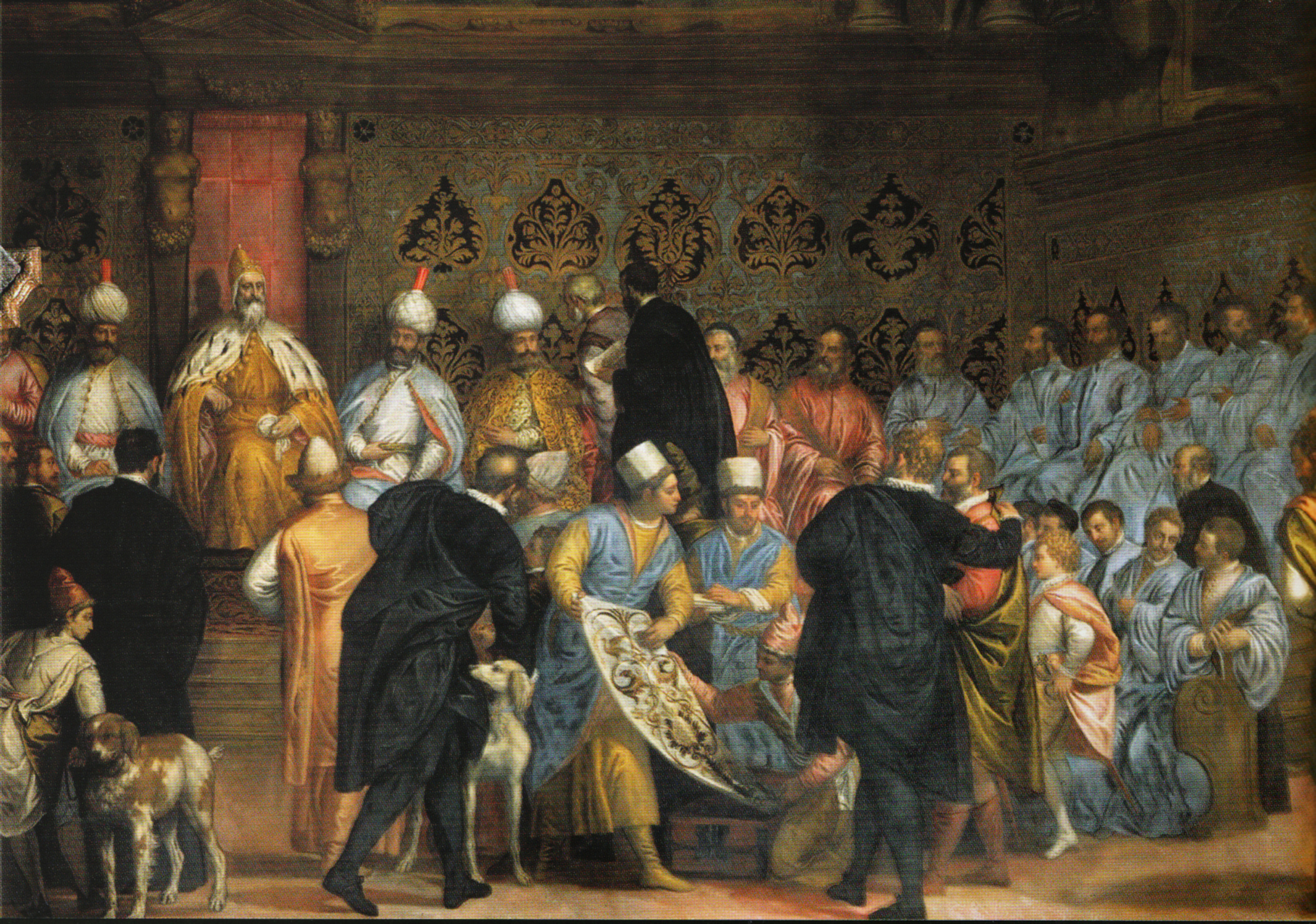
Fresco in the Doge's Palace, depicting Doge Marino Grimani receiving the Persian Ambassadors, 1599

In 1599, Abbas sent his first diplomatic mission to Europe. The group crossed the Caspian Sea and spent the winter in Moscow before proceeding through Norway and Germany (where it was received by Emperor Rudolf II) to Rome, where Pope Clement VIII gave the travellers a long audience. They finally arrived at the court of Philip III of Spain in 1602. Although the expedition never managed to return to Iran, being shipwrecked on the journey around Africa, it marked an important new step in contacts between Iran and Europe. The Europeans began to be fascinated by the Iranians and their culture – Shakespeare's Twelfth Night (1601–02), for example, makes two references (at II.5 and III.4) to 'the Sophy', then the English term for the shahs of Iran. Henceforward, the number of diplomatic missions to and fro greatly increased.

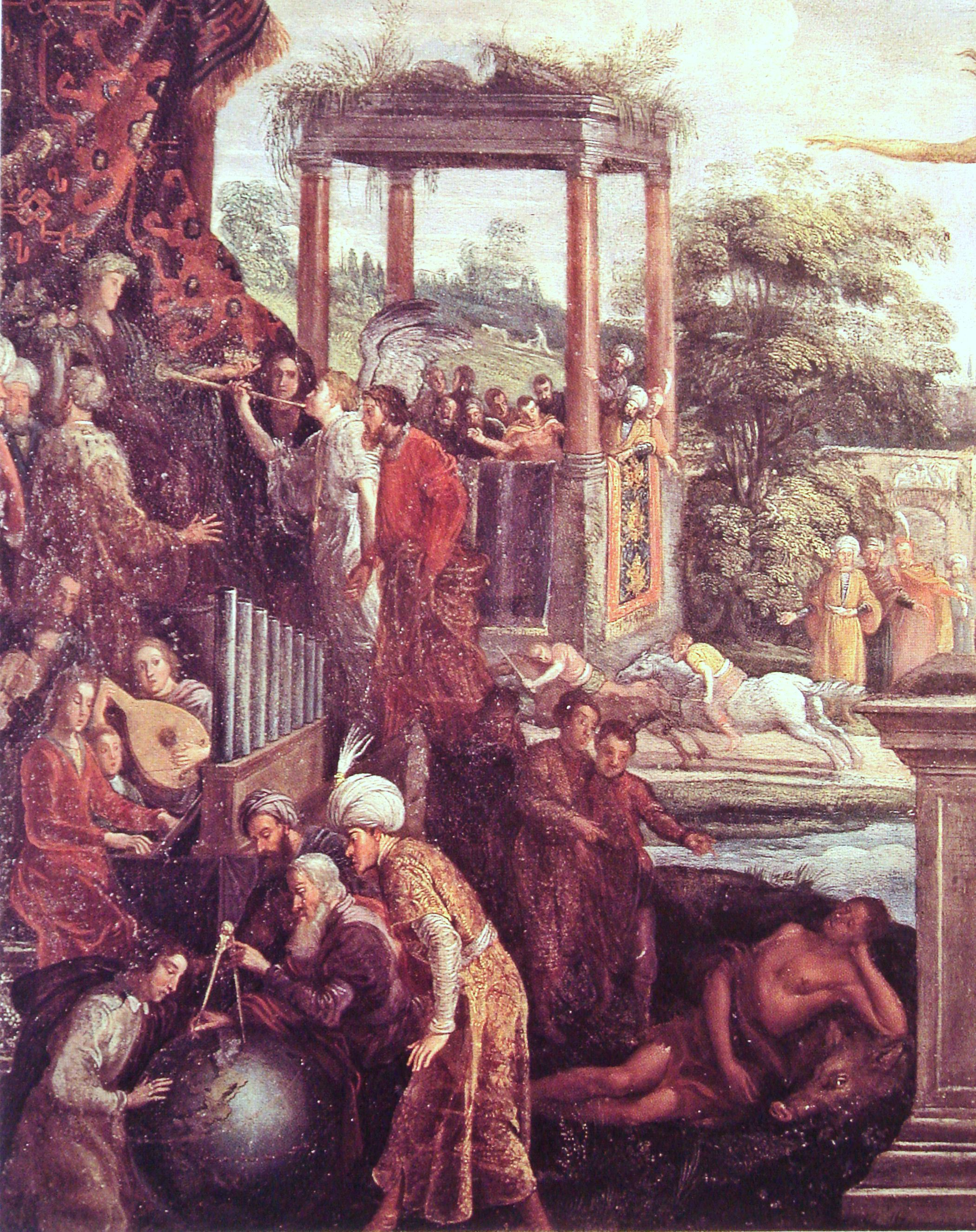
Abbas I as a new Caesar being honoured by the Trumpets of Fame, together with the 1609–1615 Persian embassy, in Allégorie de l'Occasion, by Frans II Francken, 1628

The shah had set great store on an alliance with Spain, the chief opponent of the Ottomans in Europe. Abbas offered trading rights and the chance to preach Christianity in Iran in return for help against the Ottomans. But the stumbling block of Hormuz remained, a vassal kingdom that had fallen into the hands of the Spanish Habsburgs when the King of Spain inherited the throne of Portugal in 1580. The Spanish demanded Abbas break off relations with the English before they would consider relinquishing the town. Abbas was unable to comply. Eventually Abbas became frustrated with Spain, as he did with the Holy Roman Empire, which wanted him to make his over 400,000 Armenian subjects swear allegiance to the Pope but did not trouble to inform the shah when the Emperor Rudolf signed a peace treaty with the Ottomans. Contacts with the Pope, Poland and Moscow were no more fruitful.

More came of Abbas's contacts with the English, although England had little interest in fighting against the Ottomans. The Shirley brothers arrived in 1598 and helped reorganize the Iranian army, which proved to be crucial in the Ottoman–Safavid War (1603–1618), which resulted in Ottoman defeats in all stages of the war and the first clear pitched Safavid victory of their archrivals. One of the Shirley brothers, Robert Shirley, would lead Abbas's second diplomatic mission to Europe from 1609 to 1615. The English East India Company also began to take an interest in Iran, and in 1622 four of its ships helped Abbas retake Hormuz from the Portuguese in the capture of Ormuz. This was the beginning of the English East India Company's long-running interest in Iran.

=== Succession and legacy of Abbas I ===
Due to his obsessive fear of assassination, Shah Abbas either put to death or blinded any member of his family who aroused his suspicion. His oldest son, the crown prince Mohammad Baqer Mirza, was executed following a court intrigue in which several Circassians were involved, while two others were blinded. Since two other sons had predeceased him, the result was a personal tragedy for Shah Abbas. When he died on 19 January 1629, he had no son capable of succeeding him.

During the early 17th century the power of the Qizilbash drastically diminished, the original militia that had helped Ismail I capture Tabriz and that had gained many administrative powers over the centuries. Power was shifting to the new class of Caucasian deportees and imports, many of the hundreds of thousands ethnic Georgians, Circassians, and Armenians. This new layer of society would continue to play a vital role in Iranian history up to and including the fall of the Qajar dynasty, some 300 years after Abbas' death.

At its zenith, during the long reign of Shah Abbas I, the empire's reach comprised Iran, Iraq, Armenia, Azerbaijan, Georgia, Dagestan, Kabardino-Balkaria, Bahrain, and parts of Turkmenistan, Uzbekistan, Afghanistan, Pakistan, and Turkey.

== Decline ==
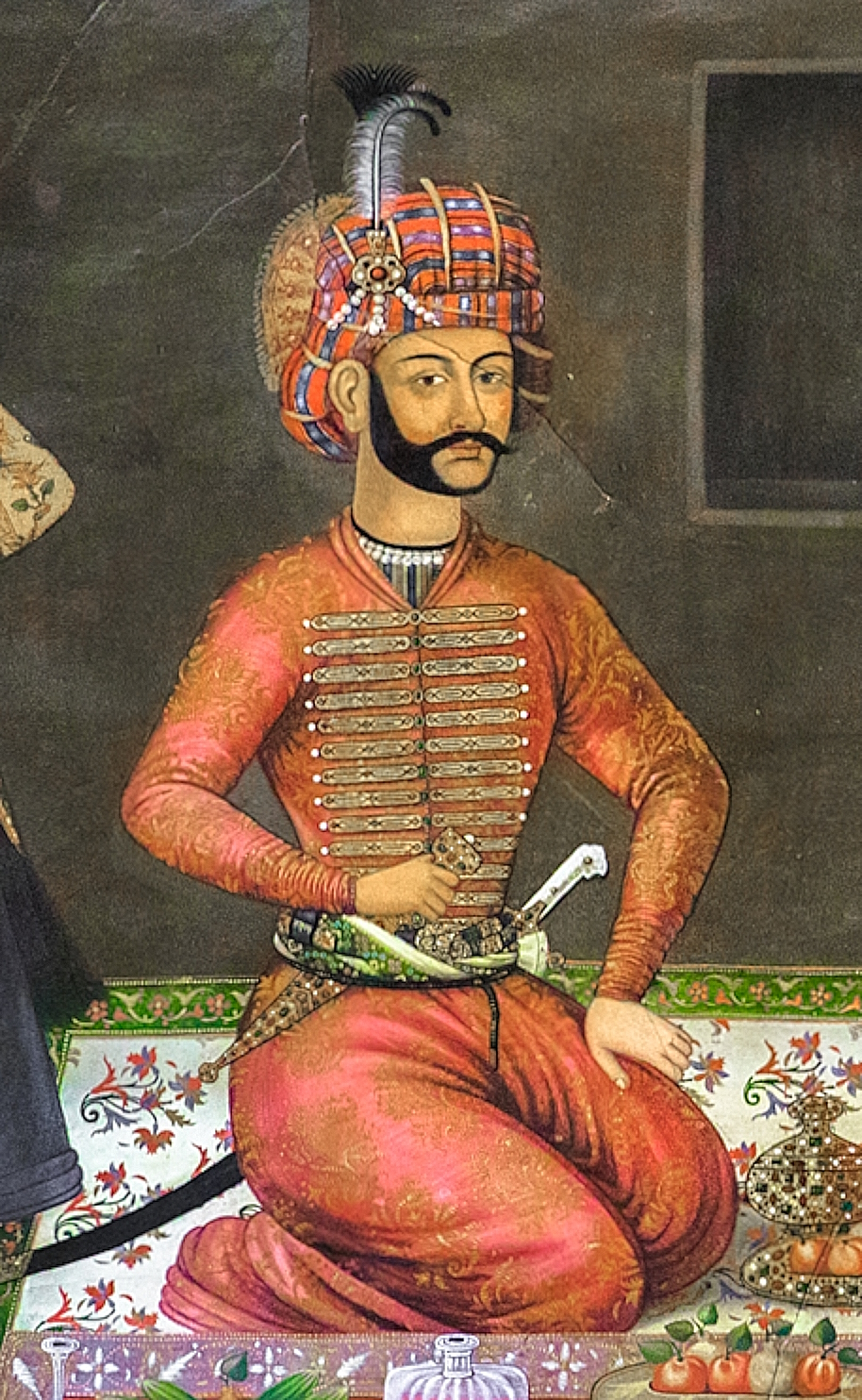
Contemporary portrait of Abbas II (r. 1642–1666). Painted circa 1647 in the Palace of Chehel Sotoun, Isfahan.

In addition to fighting its perennial enemies, their archrival the Ottomans and the Uzbeks as the 17th century progressed, Iran had to contend with the rise of new neighbors. Russian Muscovy in the previous century had deposed two western Asian khanates of the Golden Horde and expanded its influence into Europe, the Caucasus Mountains and Central Asia. Astrakhan came under Russian rule, nearing the Safavid possessions in Dagestan. In the far eastern territories, the Mughals of India had expanded into Khorasan (now Afghanistan) at the expense of Iranian control, briefly taking Kandahar. The Ahmadzai dynasty of the Kalat Khanate, which controlled most of Balochistan, had been allied with the Mughal emperor Aurangzeb ʿAlamgir I since 1666. During the reign of Samandar Khan, a Safavid army conducted a military expedition under Tahmasb Beg with the planned of annex Western Balochistan to Iran. Samandar Khan defeated the Safavid army and Tahmasb Beg was killed.

In 1659, the Kingdom of Kakheti rose up against the Safavid Iranian rule due to a change of policy that included the mass settling of Qizilbash Turkic tribes in the region in order to repopulate the province, after Shah Abbas' earlier mass deportations of between 130,000–200,000 Georgian subjects to Iran's mainland and massacre of another thousand in 1616 virtually left the province without any substantial population. This Bakhtrioni Uprising was successfully defeated under personal direction of Shah Abbas II himself. However, strategically it remained inconclusive. The Iranian authority was restored in Kakheti, but the Qizilbash Turkics were prevented from settling in Kakheti, which undermined the planned Iranian policies in the respective province.

More importantly, European trading companies used their superior means of maritime power to control trade routes in the western Indian Ocean. As a result, Safavid Iran's overseas links to East Africa, the Arabian peninsula and South Asia were greatly diminished. Overland trade grew notably however, as Iran was able to further develop its overland trade with North and Central Europe during the second half of the seventeenth century. In the late seventeenth century, Iranian merchants established a permanent presence as far north as Narva on the Baltic Sea, in what now is Estonia.

Iranian trade with European merchants led to the depletion of much of Iran's metal supplies. Except for Shah Abbas II, the Safavid rulers after Abbas I were therefore rendered ineffectual, and the Iranian government declined and finally collapsed when a serious military threat emerged on its eastern border in the early eighteenth century. The end of the reign of Abbas II, 1666, thus marked the beginning of the end of the Safavid dynasty. Despite falling revenues and military threats, later shahs had lavish lifestyles. Soltan Hoseyn (1694–1722) in particular was known for his love of wine and disinterest in governance.

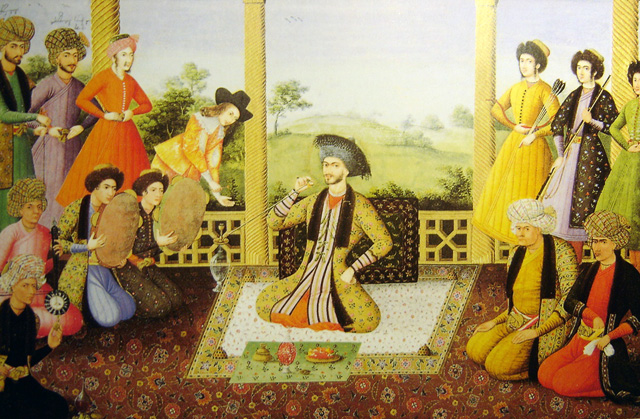
Shah Suleiman I and his courtiers, Isfahan, 1670. Painter is Aliquli Jabbadar, and is kept at The St. Petersburg Institute of Oriental Studies in Russia, ever since it was acquired by Tsar Nicholas II. Note the two Georgian figures with their names at the top left.

The country was repeatedly raided on its frontiers – Kerman by Baloch tribes in 1698, Khorasan by the Hotakis in 1717, Herat taken in 1719 by the Abdalis in the Battle of Herat, Dagestan and northern Shirvan by the Lezgins in 1721, constantly in Mesopotamia by Sunni peninsula Arabs. Sultan Hosein tried to forcibly convert his Afghan subjects in Qandahar from Sunni to Twelverism. In response, a Ghilzai Afghan chieftain named Mirwais Hotak revolted and killed Gurgin Khan, the Safavid governor of the region, along with his army. In 1721 the British and Dutch factories at Bandar Abbas were attacked by a force of four thousand Baloch on horseback, who (apparently encouraged by the Afghan invasion of Persia) overran the province of Kerman and raided westward into Lorestan. In 1722, an Afghan army led by Mir Wais' son Mahmud advanced on the heart of the empire and defeated the government forces at the Battle of Gulnabad. He then besieged the capital of Isfahan, until Shah Soltan Hoseyn abdicated and acknowledged him as the new king of Iran. At the same time, the Russians led by Peter the Great attacked and conquered swaths of Safavid Iran's North Caucasian, Transcaucasian, and northern mainland territories through the Russo-Iranian War (1722–1723). The Safavids' archrivals, the neighbouring Ottomans, invaded western and northwestern Safavid Iran and took swaths of territory there, including the city of Baghdad. Together with the Russians, they agreed to divide and keep the conquered Iranian territories for themselves as confirmed in the Treaty of Constantinople (1724).

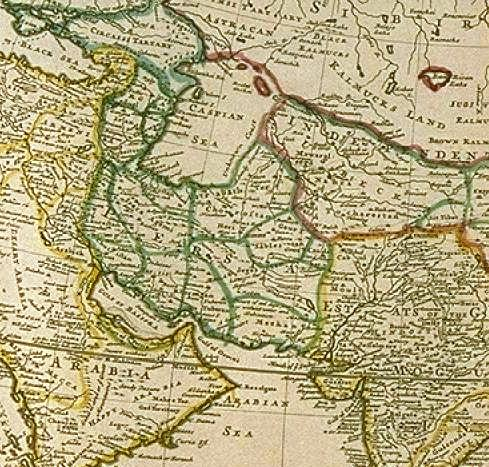
A map of Safavid Empire in 1720, showing different states of Persia

The tribal Afghans dominated their conquered territory for seven years but were prevented from making further gains by Nader Shah, a former slave who had risen to military leadership within the Afshar tribe in Khorasan, a vassal state of the Safavids. Quickly making a name as a military genius both feared and respected amongst the empire's friends and enemies (including Iran's archrival the Ottoman Empire, and Russia; both empires Nader would deal with soon afterwards), Nader Shah easily defeated the Afghan Hotaki forces in the 1729 Battle of Damghan. He had removed them from power and banished them from Iran by 1729. In 1732 by the Treaty of Resht and in 1735 Treaty of Ganja, he negotiated an agreement with the government of Empress Anna Ioanovna that resulted in the return of the recently annexed Iranian territories, making most of the Caucasus fall back into Iranian hands, while establishing an Irano-Russian alliance against the common neighbouring Ottoman enemy. In the Ottoman–Iranian War (1730–35), he retook all territories lost by the Ottoman invasion of the 1720s, as well as beyond. With the Safavid state and its territories secured, in 1738 Nader conquered the Hotaki's last stronghold in Kandahar; in the same year, in need of fortune to aid his military careers against his Ottoman and Russian imperial rivals, he started his invasion of the wealthy but weak Mughal Empire accompanied by his Georgian subject Erekle II, occupying Ghazni, Kabul, Lahore, and as far as Delhi, in India, when he completely humiliated and looted the militarily inferior Mughals. These cities were later inherited by his Abdali Afghan military commander, Ahmad Shah Durrani, who would go on to found the Durrani Empire in 1747. Nadir had effective control under Shah Tahmasp II and then ruled as regent of the infant Abbas III until 1736 when he had himself crowned shah.

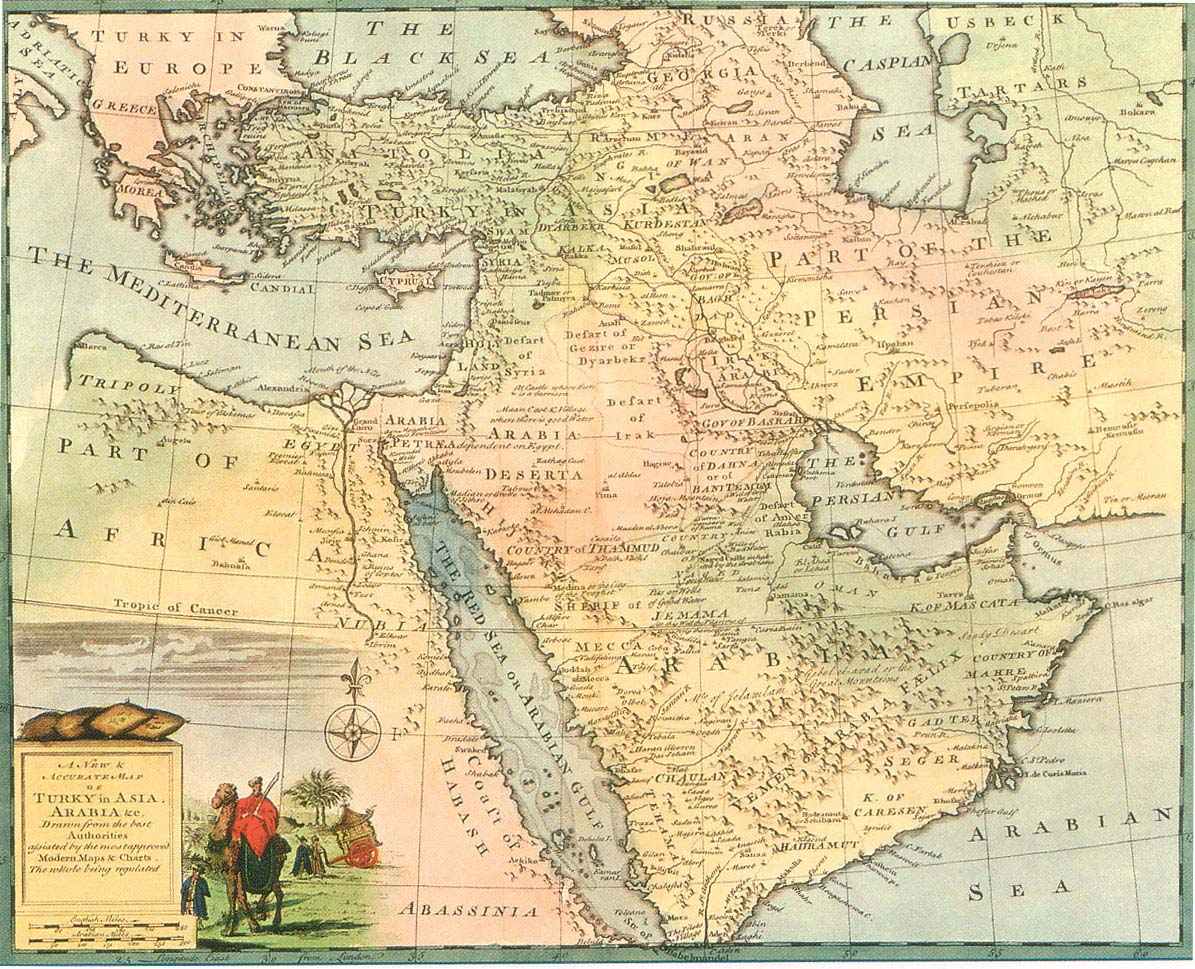
Part of the Safavid Persian Empire (on right), the Ottoman Empire, and West Asia in general, Emanuel Bowen, 1744–52

Immediately after Nader Shah's assassination in 1747 and the disintegration of his short-lived empire, the Safavids were re-appointed as shahs of Iran in order to lend legitimacy to the nascent Zand dynasty. However, the brief puppet regime of Ismail III ended in 1760 when Karim Khan felt strong enough to take nominal power of the country as well and officially end the Safavid dynasty.

== Bibliography ==
- Asat'iani, Nodar; Bendianachvili, Alexandre (1997). Histoire de la Géorgie [History of Georgia] (in French). Paris, France: L'Harmattan. ISBN 2-7384-6186-7. LCCN 98159624.
- Ashraf, Ahmad (2016) [2006]. "Iranian identity iii. Medieval Islamic period". In Yarshater, Ehsan (ed.). Encyclopædia Iranica (Online ed.). Encyclopædia Iranica Foundation.
- Axworthy, Michael (2010). The Sword of Persia: Nader Shah, from Tribal Warrior to Conquering Tyrant. I.B. Tauris. ISBN 978-0857721938.
- Blow, David (2009). Shah Abbas: The Ruthless King Who Became an Iranian Legend. I.B. Tauris. ISBN 978-0857716767. Archived from the original on 2025-11-04.
- Bosworth, Clifford Edmund (2013) [1988]. "Barda and Barda-Dāri v. Military slavery in Islamic Iran". In Yarshater, Ehsan (ed.). Encyclopædia Iranica (Online ed.). Encyclopædia Iranica Foundation.
- Bryer, Anthony (1975). Greeks and Türkmens: The Pontic Exception. Vol. 29. Dumbarton Oaks Papers. pp. 113–148. doi:10.2307/1291371. JSTOR 1291371.
- Gelvin, James L. (2005). "Biographical Sketches". The Modern Middle East: A History. Oxford University Press. ISBN 978-0-19-021886-7.
- Ghereghlou, Kioumars (2016). "Ḥaydar Ṣafavi". In Yarshater, Ehsan (ed.). Encyclopædia Iranica (Online ed.). Encyclopædia Iranica Foundation.
- Khanbaghi, Aptin (2006). The Fire, the Star and the Cross: Minority Religions in Medieval and Early Modern Iran. I.B. Tauris. ISBN 978-1845110567.
- Lapidus, Ira M. (2012). "The Safavid Empire". Islamic Societies to the Nineteenth Century: A Global History. Cambridge University Press. ISBN 978-0-521-51441-5.
- Mitchell, Colin P. (2011). New Perspectives on Safavid Iran: Empire and Society. Taylor & Francis. ISBN 978-1-136-99194-3.
- Hassanpour, Amir (2013) [1995]. "Dimdim". In Yarshater, Ehsan (ed.). Encyclopædia Iranica (Online ed.). Encyclopædia Iranica Foundation.
- Matthee, Rudolph P. (2013) [2001]. "Georgia vii. Georgians in the Safavid Administration". In Yarshater, Ehsan (ed.). Encyclopædia Iranica (Online ed.). Encyclopædia Iranica Foundation.
- Mitchell, Colin P. (2012) [2009]. "Ṭahmāsp I". In Yarshater, Ehsan (ed.). Encyclopædia Iranica (Online ed.). Encyclopædia Iranica Foundation.
- Mikaberidze, Alexander (2015). Historical Dictionary of Georgia (2 ed.). Rowman & Littlefield. ISBN 978-1442241466.
- Munshī, Iskander (1978). The History of Shah ʻAbbas the Great. University of Michigan: Westview Press. ISBN 9780891582960.
- Nahavandi, Houchang; Bomati, Yves (1998). Shah Abbas, Empereur de Perse: 1587–1629 (in French). Paris: Perrin. ISBN 9782262011314. LCCN 99161812.
- Newman, Andrew J. (2009) [2006]. Safavid Iran: Rebirth of a Persian Empire. I.B. Tauris. ISBN 9781845118303.
- Roemer, Hans Robert (1986). "The Safavid Period". In Jackson, Peter; Lockhart, Laurence (eds.). The Cambridge History of Iran. Vol. 6: The Timurid and Safavid Periods. Cambridge University Press. ISBN 0-521-20094-6.
- Manz, Beatrice Forbes; Haneda, Masashi (2016) [1990]. "Čarkas". In Yarshater, Ehsan (ed.). Encyclopædia Iranica (Online ed.). Encyclopædia Iranica Foundation.
- Savory, Roger M. (2007) [1980]. Iran Under the Safavids. Cambridge University Press. ISBN 978-0521042512.
- Savory, Roger M. (2018) [1982]. "Abbās I". In Yarshater, Ehsan (ed.). Encyclopædia Iranica (Online ed.). Encyclopædia Iranica Foundation.
- Savory, Roger M. (2017) [1985]. "Allāhverdī Khan (1)". In Yarshater, Ehsan (ed.). Encyclopædia Iranica (Online ed.). Encyclopædia Iranica Foundation.
- Savory, Roger M.; Karamustafa, Ahmet T. (2017) [1998]. "Esmāʿīl I Ṣafawī". In Yarshater, Ehsan (ed.). Encyclopædia Iranica (Online ed.). Encyclopædia Iranica Foundation.
- Sicker, Martin (2001). The Islamic World in Decline: From the Treaty of Karlowitz to the Disintegration of the Ottoman Empire. Greenwood Publishing Group. ISBN 978-0275968915.
- Streusand, Douglas E. (2011). Islamic Gunpowder Empires: Ottomans, Safavids, and Mughals. Westview Press. ISBN 9780813313597.
- Svanidze, Mikheil (2009). "The Amasya Peace Treaty between the Ottoman Empire and Iran (June 1, 1555) and Georgia". Bulletin of the Georgian National Academy of Sciences. 3 (1): 191–197. Archived from the original on 2025-12-22.
- Sykes, P. M. (1963) [1915]. A History of Persia. Vol. 2 (3rd ed.). Routledge.
- Tucker, Ernest (2015) [2006]. "Nāder Shah". In Yarshater, Ehsan (ed.). Encyclopædia Iranica (Online ed.). Encyclopædia Iranica Foundation.
