= Women in Safavid Iran =

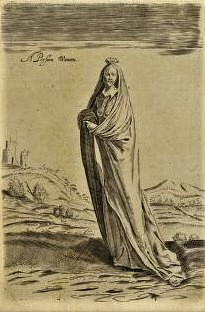
1628 illustration of a woman in Safavid Iran

Women in Safavid Iran (1300-1796) refers to the position and status of women across Safavid society and culture within Safavid Iran. These women enjoyed a wide range of rights and freedom depending on their social status. Upper-class women had access to education and were both politically and publicly active in the Empire. Women in the other classes experienced freedoms like being able to travel, even without their spouses, and managing the economic affairs of their family. All women were visible in the public sphere. However after the death of Shah Abbas in 1629 women's freedom started decreasing and women began to disappear from the public eye. During the rule of Shah Abbas II women experienced restrictions. This period was seen as one of the most difficult times for women in Safavid Iran. Women got constrained to a set of gender-specific roles based on stringent Persian gender norms.

== Earlier periods of Safavid Iran ==
=== Upper-class women ===
The upper-class women in Safavid Iran played a prominent role in society and governance. They had great power over many spheres, especially over the politics of the country.

==== Education ====
Safavid queens received education that was comparable to their brothers education. They were appointed 'dadas' and 'lalas' (nurses and tutors). This meant that most princesses were able to read and write. Religious teaching was also part of the education the princesses received. Besides that there was also space to learn about art of calligraphy, poetry and other disciplines. The importance of education for Safavid princesses has to do with the experiences that they were expected to have since they are royal women.

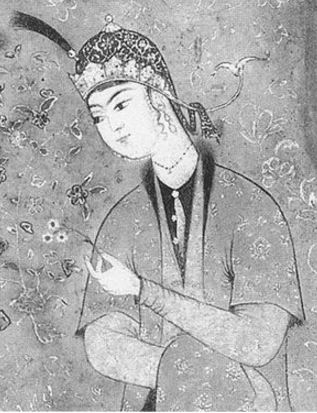
Painting of a Safavid princess from the 16th century by a Persian painter

==== Economic independence ====
Upper-class women of the Safavid Empire were in charge of their own economic affairs. Women accounted for at least twenty percent of property sales in the Empire. Women only received half of their brothers share of inheritance, but they did have full say over their own share. Also engagement in economic activities was seen, royal women would give money to charities and public endowments. They bought land and built caravanserais and bridges. In the 1660s all upper-class women were given landed property, they were now also able to collect taxes in a district.

==== Public and political roles ====
Because of their high social standing, royal women were able to take part in the public domain and have an active political role. Safavid princesses would partake in diplomatic relations. They would send ambassadors to foreign states, write diplomatic letters and sometimes even act as intermediaries. When the Shah retired into the harem, female influence on politics grew even more. However this growth was only seen behind harem walls. One of the women that gained great power around that time was Maryam Bigum, the great-aunt of Shah Sultan Husayn. He was the last ruler of the dynasty and controlled by his great-aunt. Royal Safavid women owned their own horses. During their rides they were always accompanied by men. They also participated in hunting parties and were able to use weapons. They would dress up like men according to their tribal custom. Women also participated in battles and sometimes even wars.

=== Women and Safavid art ===
In the Safavid Empire women had the responsibility of advancing the works of art. In the 16th century, Mashad was the flourishing centre of arts in the Empire. The Safavids had high intellectual values and it was the women who were supposed to provide for them. This is why so many upper-class women got educated and were able to read.

=== Middle class women ===
Women from the middle and lower classes were more visible in society than those from the upper classes. As previously said, Persian-language sources are mainly reticent on these topics, save when they concern the shah and his acts. Shah 'Abbas I, for example, made Monday trips to the Chahr Bagh Promenade solely open to women. However, because the mention is so brief, it is unclear how long this custom existed, whose sorts of women were part, and what the fun and leisure consisted of. Storybooks, on the other hand, may provide knowledge by depicting the atmosphere of towns and villages in their period. Women were not only allowed to go with their husbands on outings to gardens surrounding the city, but they were also allowed to travel alone with the caravan, according to several accounts in these publications. Moreover, women would consult their husbands and even managed their family's finances in such a way that their spouses handed over their earnings to their wives to spend as they pleased. Furthermore, while we see women from the middle classes in certain photographs of parks and promenades, we cannot be certain that all women were permitted to visit these locations, in fact, these may be boys dressed as women since it was custom for musicians and dancers to wear female clothes.

=== Lower class women ===
Women from the lower classes were the most approachable to foreign visitors, in the discovered travel accounts it are these women that are talked most about. Besides housekeeping that required them to leave their homes, such as washing clothes, women were frequently required to perform tasks like farming, animal husbandry, knitting, sewing, and spinning. They would often also work in homes of the middle- and upper-class. They performed tasks like midwifery and even practised forms of medicine. Women on the countryside, especially from the lower class, experienced much more freedom and were less restricted compared to women in the cities. As a result, even though they remained in the lower classes, they had a higher economic standing. They also were much less covered with clothes due to the rarity of non-kin contacts.

=== Prostitutes ===
During this time, there were also sex slaves. With the exception of a few banned areas, they were found in big numbers in all urban areas. They were officially sanctioned and taxed. They were not all of the same socioeconomic class; Some charged high fees and were rich, while others lived in poverty. They lacked social acceptance in the Empire and lived in their own accommodations because their job was not socially approved by most. Non-Muslim women worked in religiously and socially questionable jobs like singing and dancing. The declaration of a Mirza Fazl Allah Esfahani's endowment to recruit a female physician and two female nurses for a hospital he founded in Isfahan indicates the presence of such jobs, which were unquestionably not limited to the upper classes; instead, nursing was a lower-class career.

== Later periods of Safavid Iran ==
By the end of the 17th century women's freedom and rights started decreasing. During the shah's enthronement in 1694 new rules were decided on, prostitution was banned and veiling got enforced. This head-to-toe covering did not exist during earlier times in the Safavid Empire. At the same time Shi'ite ideologies were established in the Empire. The Shi'ite clergy wanted women to take a traditional matriarchal role in their families. More freedoms were taken away, like freedom of movement without permission from a husband. The decrease in female visibility in Safavid Iran is closely tied to the rise of religious conservatism. At the end of the Safavid Empire women were only allowed out when so concealed that besides their eyes and nose nothing was visible. Women however did still have power in the harem.

== Sources ==
- Ahmadi, Nozhat (2021). "Vaqf in the Safavid period". The Safavid World. pp. 374–386. doi:10.4324/9781003170822-23. ISBN 978-1-00-317082-2. S2CID 236367253.
- Gholsorkhi, Shohreh (1995). "Pari Khan Khanum: A Masterful Safavid Princess". Iranian Studies. 28 (3–4): 143–156. doi:10.1080/00210869508701833.
- Matthee, Rudi, ed. (2021). The Safavid World. doi:10.4324/9781003170822. ISBN 978-1-00-317082-2. S2CID 236371308.
- Mitchell, Colin P. (2011). New Perspectives on Safavid Iran: Empire and Society. Taylor & Francis. ISBN 978-1-136-99194-3.
- Nazari, Jessamine (7 January 2018). "The Shadow Government: Influence of Elite Safavid Women". ShareOK. hdl:11244.46/1535.
- Rahbari, Ladan (14 January 2021). "Gendered and Ethnic Captivity and Slavery in Safavid Persia: A Literature Review". Social Sciences. 10 (1): 22. doi:10.3390/socsci10010022.
- Wallace, Heather (2015). Feminine Power in Safavid Iran: Space, Visibility, and Politics (Thesis). ProQuest 1724632437.
- Zarinebaf‐Shahr, Fariba (1998). "Economic Activities of Safavid Women in the Shrine‐City of Ardabil". Iranian Studies. 31 (2): 247–261. doi:10.1080/00210869808701907.
