= Kandahari Begum =

Safavid princess and first wife of the Mughal emperor Shah Jahan (1593-?)

- Safavid princess Empress of the Mughal Empire
- Born: c. 1593; Kandahar, Kabul Subah, Mughal Empire (modern-day Afghanistan)
- Burial: Kandahari Bagh, Agra
- Spouse: Shah Jahan (m. 1610)
- Issue: Parhez Banu Begum
- House: Safavid (by birth); Timurid (by marriage)
- Father: Sultan Muzaffar Husain Mirza Safavi
- Religion: Shia Islam

Kandahari Begum (Note: Persian: قندهاری بیگم) (also spelled Qandahari Begum; c. 1593 – ?; also known as Kandahari Mahal; meaning "Lady from Kandahar") was the first wife of the Mughal emperor Shah Jahan and the mother of his first child, Princess Parhez Banu Begum.

== Family and early life ==
Kandahari Begum was born a princess of the Safavid dynasty, the ruling dynasty of Persia (Modern day Iran and Iraq), and was one of the most historically significant royal lineages in the history of the entire region.

Born to Mozaffar-Hosayn Mirza of the royal house of Persia, who was the son of Sultan Hosayn Mirza. Sultan Hosayn was the grandson of the Safavid dynasty's founder, Shah Ismail I, and was a direct ancestor of Shah Abbas I.

Mirza Muzzaffar having some problems with the Safavid ruling authorities and perceiving the Uzbek pressure to capture Kandahar was forced to capitulate on terms to surrender it to the Mughals. Therefore, as Akbar who was keenly waiting for any chance to capture Kandahar, immediately sent Shah Beg Khan Arghun, Governor of Bangash, to take prompt possession of Kandahar, and though, as in all his undertakings, Muzaffar wavered at the last moment and had recourse to trickery, he was obliged by the firm and prudent behavior of Shah Beg Khan. In this way Kandahari Begum had to leave her native place to visit India in the company of her father during Akbar's reign, near the end of 1595 when her father and her four brothers, Bahram Mirza, Haider Mirza, Alqas Mirza and Tahmasp Mirza and 1000 qazilbash soldiers arrived in India. Muzaffar Khan received from Akbar the title of Farzand (son), and was made a Commander of five thousand, and received Sambhal as Jagir (property), “which is worth more than all Kandahar.”

Mirza Muzaffar had exchanged the lordship of Kandahar for a high rank and splendid salary in the service of Emperor Akbar. His younger brother Mirza Rustam, also immigrated to India in Akbar's reign and rose to eminence under Jahangir. The Mughal Emperors made the most of this opportunity of ennobling their blood by alliance with the royal family of Persia even through a younger branch. Muzaffar found everything in India bad, and sometimes resolved to go to Persia, and sometimes to Makkah. From grief and disappointment, and a bodily hurt, he died in 1603. His mausoleum (now a domeless crumbled down stone and brick structure with an underground burial chamber with Persian Nastaleeq calligraphed epitaph on the door facing South,) lies amidst other ruins in a garden complex that now is the campsite of the Bharat Scouts & Guides Delhi Jamboree, north of Humayun's Tomb at Delhi.

== Marriage to Shah Jahan ==
=== Betrothal ===
When Jahangir to reconsider the Persian question at the end of 1609, pragmatism as always came to the fore. It would be madness to antagonize such a powerful personality, not least because a declaration of open hostilities between Agra and Isfahan would likely prompt Shah Abbas I to send arms, men and money to his Shiite allies in the three Deccan kingdoms. That would doom the campaign led by his second son, Sultan Pervez Mirza. Persia's duplicity over Kandahar, then, had to be set aside and relations smoothed. As always, a politically expedient marriage would provide the answer, and with his eldest son, Khusrau Mirza, in prison and Pervez already bound for Burhanpur and the southern front, his third son, Sultan Khurram, was the logical choice. The decision to shape this purely strategic alliance came as mixed news to the young man. On the one hand, he had been denied the consummation of his long standing betrothal to Arjumand Banu Begum later known as Mumtaz Mahal; set against that was the renewal of his central position on his father's attentions and in the politics of the moment.

And so it was that eighteen-year-old Khurram was compelled to make his first marriage to a young Persian maiden. Subsequent Mughal court recorders and biographers, however, merely accord the princess the blandly descriptive label Qandahari Mahal, a clear indication of her lesser status at the court. The process of arranging the marriage appears to have taken some time. The Emperor Jahangir recorded two related entries in his memoirs, nearly a year apart. The first appeared as just one item of business in a typically humdrum account of the day's court transactions, regional promotions, salary checks and other miscellaneous imperial housekeeping chores. On Sunday, 12 December 1609, Jahangir sent fifty thousand rupees as a wedding pledge to Kandahari Begum's house. Jahangir writes in his Tuzuk that “previously to this I had the daughter of Mirza Muzaffar Husain, son of Sultan Husain Mirza Safavi, ruler of Qandahar, betrothed to my son Sultan Khurram, and on this the marriage meeting had been arranged, I went to the house of Baba Khurram and passed the night there.”

=== Marriage ===
Kandahari Begum married Prince Khurram on 8 November 1610 in Agra. There were several family connections between their two families. Khurram's official biographer, Muhammad Amin Qazvini, was far more eloquent in his description of the marriage. Indeed, effusive compliments were the order of the day and his delirious account left no superlative unexplored. The festive assembly was arranged in a beautifully appointed mansion that was traditionally assigned to the widow mother of the ruling emperor and located inside the thick walls of Agra Fort adjacent to the palatial State House. The astrologers duly consulted the marriage at an auspicious hour.

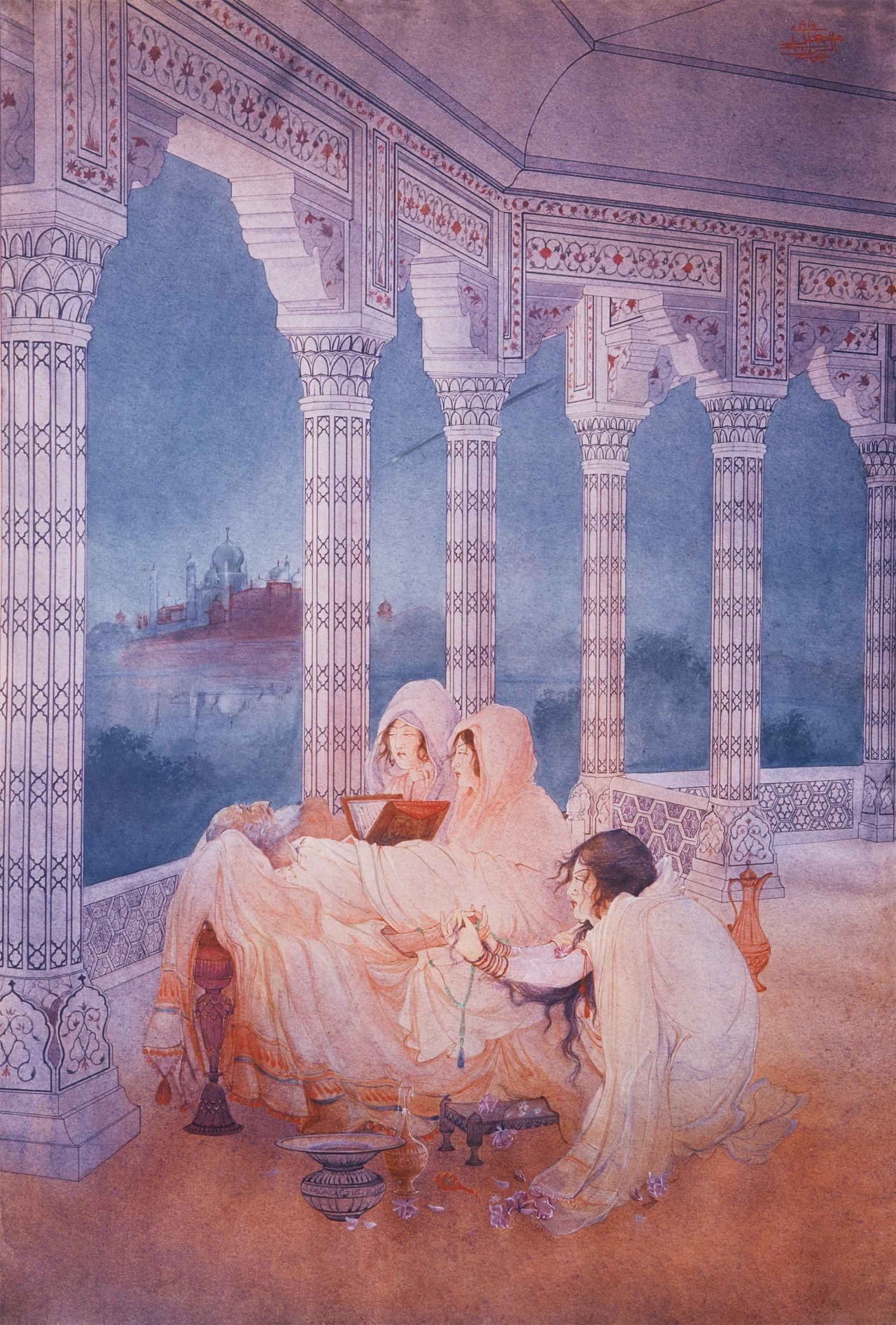
The consorts of Shah Jahan accompanying him during his imprisonment at Agra fort.

On 21 August 1611, she gave birth to the couple's first child, a daughter, who was named "Parhez Banu Begum" by her grandfather, Emperor Jahangir. However, in the Maasir-i-Alamgiri, she is referred to as Purhunar Banu Begum. She was the eldest child of her father, but the only child of her mother.

== Burial place ==
She lies buried at Agra, in the center of the expansive unded at Agra founded by her (c. 1628 - 50), called Kandahari Bagh. She also had a mosque built, which was three arched, single dome mosque on the western side of the Kandahari Bagh at Agra. It served a quarry of bricks for constructing modern day buildings in the complex, and is no longer extant. The building over her tomb was largely destroyed during the period of anarchy which followed Aurangzeb's death in 1707. The building, which is in the vault is converted into a dwelling place. Her tomb does not exist any more, just the compound it was situated in does, along with one of the entrance gates, a portion of the wall and a couple of the wall's corner cupolas. The British East India Company sold it to the Raja of Bharatpur who raised some modern buildings in it. The compound became property of the Bharatpur rulers at some point in the colonial era, and a mansion was built in place of the central tomb. Thence it became famous as "Bharatpur House". A gate and a few corner chhatris of the original garden have survived.

== In popular culture ==
- Kandahari Begum is a main character in Sonja Chandrachud's historical novel Trouble at the Taj (2011).
- Kandahari Begum is a principal character in Ruchir Gupta's historical novel Mistress of the Throne (2014).
- Negar Khan portrayed Kandahari Begum in the 2005 Bollywood film Taj Mahal: An Eternal Love Story.

== Bibliography ==
- Beale, Thomas William (1881). The Oriental Biographical Dictionary. Asiatic Society.
- Havell, Ernest Binfield (1904). A Handbook to Agra and the Taj: Sikandra, Fatehpur-Sikri and the Neighbourhood. Longmans, Green, and Company.
- Indica, Volume 40. Heras Institute of Indian History and Culture, St. Xavier's College. 2003.
- Latif, Syad Muhammad (1896). Agra, Historical & Descriptive: With an Account of Akbar and His Court and of the Modern City of Agra.
- Mundy, Peter (1967). The Travels of Peter Mundy, in Europe and Asia, 1608-1667 ... Hakluyt society.
- Mubārak, Abū al-Faz̤l ibn (1873). The Ain i Akbari, Volume 1. Rouse.
- Nicoll, Fergus (2009). Shah Jahan: The Rise and Fall of the Mughal Emperor. Penguin Books India. ISBN 978-0-670-08303-9.
- Singh, Nagendra Kr (2001). Encyclopaedia of Muslim Biography: Muh-R. A.P.H. Pub. Corp. ISBN 978-8-176-48234-9.
