= Parhez Banu Begum =

Mughal princess (1611–1675)

- Shahzadi of the Mughal Empire
- Born: 21 August 1611; Agra, Agra Subah, India
- Died: 19 October 1675 (aged 64); Delhi, Delhi Subah, India
- Burial: Delhi
- House: Timurid
- Father: Shah Jahan
- Mother: Qandahari Begum
- Religion: Sunni Islam

Parhez Banu Begum (Persian: پرهیز بانو بیگم; 21 August 1611 – 19 October 1675) was a Mughal princess, the first child and eldest daughter of Mughal emperor Shah Jahan from his first wife, Qandahari Begum. She was also the older half-sister of her father's successor, the sixth Mughal emperor Aurangzeb.

== Life ==
Parhez was born on 21 August 1611 in Agra to Prince Khurram (the future emperor Shah Jahan) and his first wife Kandahari Begum. She was named 'Parhez Banu Begum' (Persian: "the abstinent Princess") by her paternal grandfather, Emperor Jahangir. However, in the Maasir-i-Alamgiri, she is referred to as Purhunar Banu Begum. Her father, Prince Khurram, was the third son of Emperor Jahangir, while her mother, Kandahari Begum, was a princess of the prominent Safavid dynasty of Iran (Persia) and was a daughter of Mozaffar-Hosayn Mirza (who was a direct descendant of Shah Ismail I).

Parhez was Shah Jahan's first child and his eldest daughter and was brought up by the Ruqaiya Sultan Begum, who had been Emperor Akbar's first wife, and who had also brought up her father, Shah Jahan till the age of 13.

Although her mother was not Shah Jahan's favourite wife, nonetheless, she was loved by her father; who had earnestly requested his daughter, Jahanara Begum (his eldest daughter from Mumtaz Mahal) on his deathbed, to look after Parhez. She was also loved and well-cared for by her younger half-brother, Aurangzeb.

== Death ==
Perhez died on 19 October 1675 in Delhi. The nobles of the subah buried her in the mausoleum (garden) built by her.

== Ancestry ==
Ancestors of Parhez Banu Begum

8. Jalal-ud-din Muhammad Akbar, Mughal Emperor
4. Nur-ud-din Muhammad Jahangir, Mughal Emperor
9. Mariam-uz-Zamani
2. Shahab-ud-din Muhammad Shah Jahan I, Mughal Emperor
10. Udai Singh, Raja of Marwar
5. Jagat Gosain
11. Manrang Devi of Gwalior
1. Parhez Banu Begum
12. Soltan Hosayn Mirza Safavi
6. Mozaffar-Hosayn Mirza
3. Kandahari Begum
