= Mozaffar-Hosayn Mirza =

Safavid prince

Governor of Qandahar
- Tenure: 1578–1595
- Predecessor: Fulad Khalifa Shamlu
- Regent: Kur Hamza Beg
- Born: 1563; Kandahar, Safavid Iran
- Died: 1600 (aged 36–37); Delhi, Mughal Empire
- Issue: Sons and daughters, among which, Qandahari Begum
- Dynasty: Safavid
- Father: Soltan Hosayn Mirza Safavi

Mozaffar-Hosayn Mirza (Persian: مظفر حسین میرزا; 1563–1600) was an Iranian nobleman from the Safavid dynasty that held the governorship of Qandahar from 1578 until his defection to India in 1595. His rule was characterized by his constant conflict with his younger brother, Rustam Mirza, and his regent, Kur Hamza Beg. In 1593, he killed Hamza Beg and captured Rustam's lands. He was then faced with raids from the Uzbek of Bukhara and the Mughal emperor Akbar wanting to conquer Qandahar. Unable to drive the Uzbeks away, he surrendered Qandahar to Akbar and defected to India. He was honoured greatly by Akbar and his daughter, Kandahari Begum, was married to Akbar's grandson, the future Shah Jahan. His son and grandson became high-ranking officials in the Mughal bureaucracy.

== Biography ==
=== Early life ===
Mozaffar-Hosayn Mirza was born c. 1563 to Soltan Hosayn Mirza, the governor of Qandahar province in Safavid Iran (now in Afghanistan). Mozaffar was a member of the Safavid dynasty, his paternal great-grandfather being Ismail I, the founder of the Safavid empire. He had four other brothers and one sister. His family were initially loyal to the imperial line; Soltan Hosayn had been treated kindly by his uncle, Tahmasp I, and was awarded with the governorship of Qandahar in 1558. However, Tahmasp was succeeded by Ismail II in 1576, to whom Mozaffar's family had less loyalty, perhaps because they wished to become independent rulers of their own rights.

Ismail initiated a purge of his male family members, in fear of their potential threat to his rule. Among the victims were Mozaffar's eldest brother, Mohammad Hosayn Mirza, who was first blinded and then killed, and his two uncles, Ibrahim Mirza and Badi-al Zaman Mirza. Mozaffar's father, Soltan Hosayn, revolted against Ismail, but died from unknown reasons in 1577. (Note: Contemporary chroniclers propose different causes of death among which are suicide, assassination and natural causes.) Ismail prevented the governorship to be passed down to Soltan Hosayn's sons, and instead appointed Fulad Khalifa of the Shamlu tribe to rule over Qandahar. According to the contemporary historian Iskandar Beg Munshi, Ismail had sent the orders for the murder of Mozaffar and his remaining brothers, but he died in 1577, before the royal agents could carry out the plot.

=== Governor of Qandahar ===
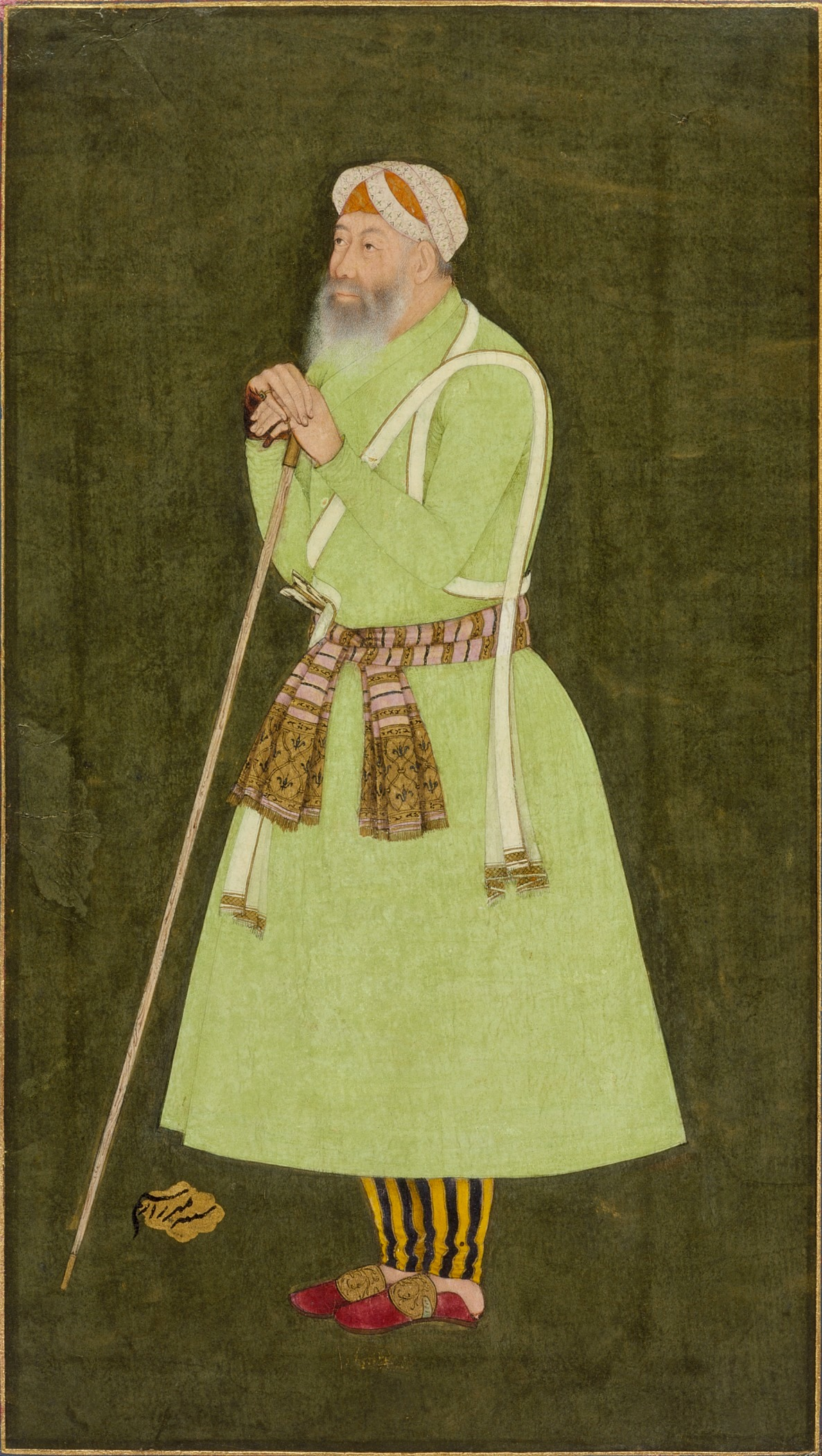
Indian portrait of Rustam Mirza, Mozaffar's brother.

Ismail was succeeded by his brother, Mohammad Khodabanda (r. 1578–1587), who was more tolerant of the existence of a cadet branch collateral to the royal family. Urged by the powerful groups of Qandahar, who wanted Soltan Hosayn's offspring to continue their rule, Khodabanda split the province of Qandahar between Mozaffar and his younger brother, Rustam Mirza; the eastern half of the province with Qandahar itself were given to Mozaffar and Rustam received the western half with the Zamindawar and Garmsir districts. Since Mozaffar and Rustam were young, fifteen and twelve respectively, Hamza Beg Zul-Qadr known as Kur (blind) became their joint vakil (regent). Around this time, the Uzbeks of Bukhara approached the Mughal emperor, Akbar, urging him to conquer Qandahar. Hamza Beg in turn reassured Akbar that the commercial traffic was stable despite the rapid political changes and there was no need for his intervention.

The division of Qandahar caused hostilities between the two brothers, as Mozaffar possessed the richer parts of the province and Rustam was unsatisfied with his share. The brothers also quarreled over Sistan, a region to the south of their lands. Sistan had once been ruled by their uncle, Badi-al Zaman Mirza, but the new ruler of the region was Najm al-Din Mahmud, a nobleman from the local Mihrabanid dynasty. Both Rustam and Mozaffar invaded Sistan but failed to gain any territories, however, Mozaffar negotiated with Najm al-Din and gained favourable results: he married Najm al-Din's daughter, and Najm al-Din's son married the daughter of Hamza Beg, and thereafter Najm al-Din and his successors were to treat Mozaffar and his offspring with good faith. Rustam Mirza envied his brother and plotted with Hamza Beg, who had a difficult relationship with Mozaffar, to conquer Qandahar.

Rustam led several attacks into Qandahar, but Mozaffar defended himself with the support of Sistan. In 1588, Rustam briefly conquered Qandahar but failed to consolidate his position. Mozaffar on the other hand increased his authority by murdering Hamza Beg and his successor, Mohammad Beg. External pressure from all sides forced Rustam Mirza to leave Iran for India in 1593, which allowed Mozaffar to take control of Zamindawar.

=== Defection to India ===
In the early 1590s, the Qandahar region experienced constant raids from the Uzbeks of Bukhara under the leadership of Abdullah Khan II. Simultaneously, the defection of Rustam had encouraged the Mughal emperor Akbar to send an army to Qandahar. Mozaffar accepted the Mughal sovereignty to drive away the Uzbeks, who did not have the power to fight the Mughals. He sent his mother and son to the Mughal court in Delhi; although he intended to remain in Qandahar as the governor, Akbar summoned him to the court. Eventually in 1595, Mozaffar left Qandahar for India and was received graciously by Akbar. He received the highest mansab (courtly rank) in Akbar's administration, the rank of 5,000, which indicated the number of his retinue and his closeness to the sovereign. Akbar honoured Mozaffar as his "son", a status conferred to special collaborators and foreign monarchs.

According to Iskandar Beg, Mozaffar always harboured a desire to return to Iran and felt disenchanted by India, this caused some estrangement between him and Akbar. He died in 1600 in Delhi, only five years after his defection, thus leaving Rustam Mirza as the head of his family in India.

== Family ==
Sources differ on the number and names of Mozaffar's children. The most accomplished of his sons was Mirza Haidar, who at the time of his death in 1631 had the mansab of 1000. Mozaffar's grandson, Nauzar Mirza, bore the rank of 4000; the Nauzar Katra neighbourhood in Patna (in northern India) is named after him. One of Mozaffar's daughters, called Kandahari Begum, was married to Prince Khurram (the future Shah Jahan). The pair had a daughter named Parhez Banu Begum, born in 1611.

== Bibliography ==
=== Primary sources ===
- Munshi, Iskandar Beg (1978) [1629]. Tarikh-e Alam-ara-ye Abbasi [History of Shah 'Abbas the Great]. Persian Heritage Series. Vol. 1. Translated by Roger M., Savory. Boulder, Colorado: Westview Press. ISBN 9780891582960. OCLC 659933391.

=== Secondary sources ===
- Ali, M. (1985). The Apparatus of Empire: Awards of Ranks, Offices, and Titles to the Mug̲h̲al Nobility, 1574-1658. Delhi: Oxford University Press. ISBN 9780195615005. OCLC 12944552.
- Askari, Syed Hasan (1944). "Bihar in the Time of Shahjahan". Proceedings of the Indian History Congress. 7. Indian History Congress: 348–359. OCLC 1179373062.
- Afshar, Hamideh Malekpour; Sarafrazi, Abbas (2018). "نقش شاهزادگان صفوی در دربار مغولان هند" [Role of Safavid Princes in the court of Indian Mugals]. Journal of Subcontinent Researches (in Persian). 10 (35). Zahedan: University of Sistan and Baluchestan: 78–99. ISSN 2538-5062. OCLC 1430190247.
- Burton, Audrey (2019). The Bukharans: A Dynastic, Diplomatic and Commercial History 1550-1702. London: Routledge. doi:10.4324/9781315026527. ISBN 9781136788680. OCLC 1222806154.
- Geevers, Liesbeth (2015). "Safavid Cousins on the Verge of Extinction: Dynastic Centralization in Central Asia and the Bahrāmī Collateral Line (1517-1593)". Journal of the Economic and Social History of the Orient. 58 (3). Leiden: Brill: 293–326. doi:10.1163/15685209-12341376. ISSN 1568-5209. JSTOR 43919246. OCLC 46849781.
- Ghereghlou, Kioumars (2016). "Esmāʿil II". Encyclopædia Iranica, online edition. New York.
- Ibáñez, Marc Morató-Aragonés (2024). "Welcoming the Future Safavid Sovereign: The Significance of Rustam Mirza's Exodus to the Mughal Empire (1593)". The Court Historian. 29 (1). London: The Society for Court Studies: 33–49. doi:10.1080/14629712.2024.2321783. ISSN 1462-9712. OCLC 43272438.
- Mir Jafari, Hossein (1977). "سیستان در عصر صفویه" [Sistan During the Age of Safavids]. Historical Research. 12 (4). Tehran: Sitād-i Buzurg-i Artishtārān: 49–76. ISSN 1010-2825. OCLC 1519175.
