= Bahram Mirza Safavi =

Prince and commander in Iran (1517–1549)

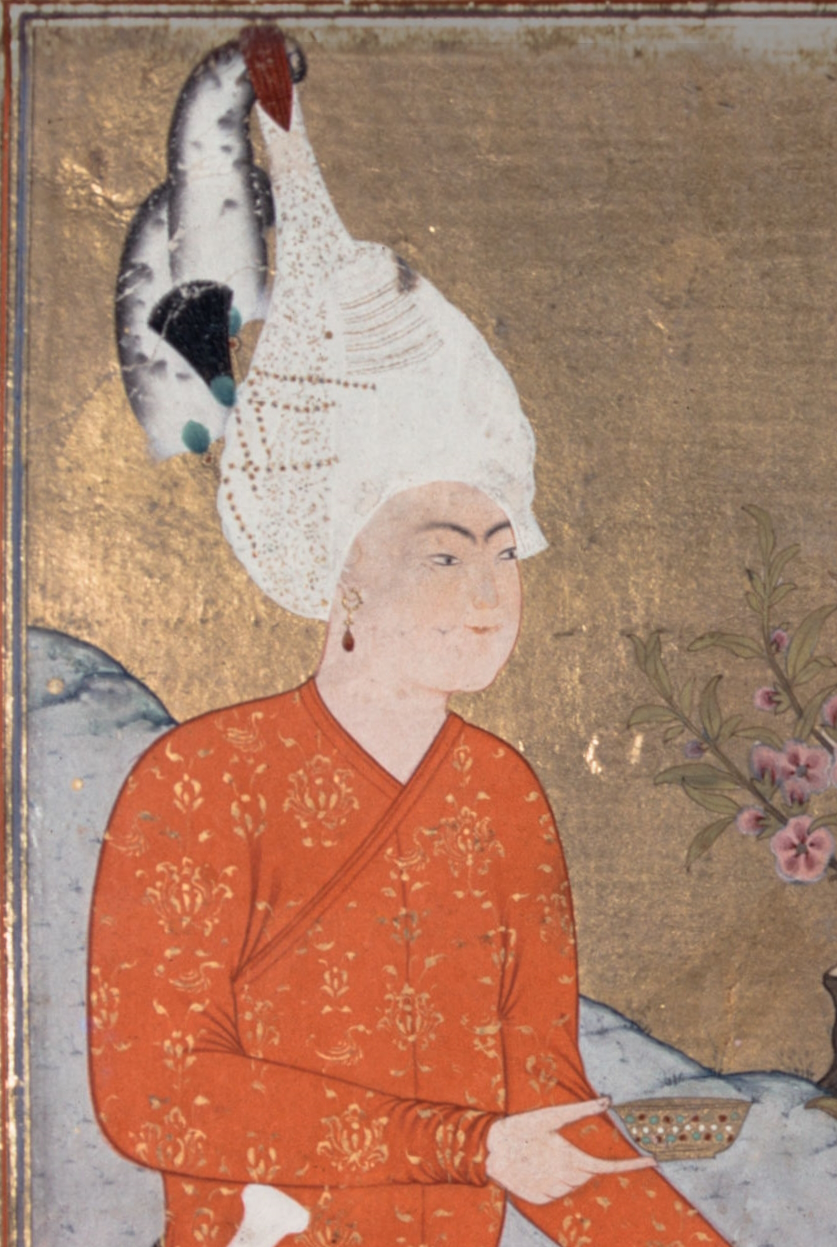
- Likely contemporary portrait of Bahram Mirza Safavi in Prince and Courtier, attributed to Dust Muhammad, circa 1540.

Governor of Herat
- Tenure: 1530–1533
- Predecessor: Sam Mirza
- Successor: Sam Mirza
- Lala: Ghazi Khan Takkalu

Governor of Hamadan
- Tenure: 1546–1549
- Predecessor: Abdollah Khan Ustajlu
- Lala: Cheragh Soltan Gerampa Ustajlu
- Born: 15 September 1517; Maragheh, Iran
- Died: 11 October 1549 (aged 32); Kurdistan province, Iran
- Burial: Mashhad
- Spouse: Zaynab Sultan Khanum
- Issue: Soltan Hosayn Mirza; Ibrahim Mirza; Badi-al Zaman Mirza Safavi
- Dynasty: Safavid
- Father: Ismail I
- Mother: Tajlu Khanum
- Religion: Twelver Shia Islam
- Military career
- Conflicts: Ottoman–Safavid War of 1532–1555

Bahram Mirza Safavi (Persian: بهرام میرزای صفوی, romanized: Bahrām Mīrzā Safavī; 15 September 1517 – 11 October 1549) was a Safavid prince, governor and military commander in 16th-century Iran. He was the youngest son of Shah Ismail I (r. 1501–1524), the founder of the Safavid dynasty.

Throughout his career, he held the governorship of Herat (1530–1533), Gilan (1536/37), and Hamadan (1546–1549). He participated actively in the war with the Ottoman Empire, and also played a key-role in suppressing the rebellion of his brother Alqas Mirza. Bahram Mirza was also a notable patron of the arts, excelling in calligraphy, painting, poetry, and music, being surrounded by some of the same painters and calligraphers as his full brother and sovereign Shah Tahmasp I (r. 1524–1576). The Bahram Mirza Album, an album of paintings and calligraphic samplings dedicated to him, is preserved at the Topkapı Palace in Istanbul. It appears to have had a significant influence on Safavid Iran's perception of a unique Persian artistic style.

Bahram Mirza died on 11 October 1549, possibly due to an overdose of opium. He was survived by his three sons Soltan Hosayn Mirza, Ibrahim Mirza and Badi-al Zaman Mirza Safavi, who all died in 1577. The latter two were killed under the orders of Shah Ismail II (r. 1576–1577), either due to paranoia from constant drug usage or to ensure his rule would not be threatened. Soltan Hosayn Mirza also died in the same year but without Shah Ismail II's intervention.

== Background ==
Bahram Mirza Safavi was born on 15 September 1517 in Maragheh. He was the youngest son of Shah Ismail I (r. 1501–1524), the founder of the Safavid dynasty of Iran. Owing to his fondness of Iranian national legends, Shah Ismail I named Bahram after the Sasanian ruler Bahram V (r. 420–438), who was famous for his romantic life and hunting feats. Bahram Mirza's mother was Tajlu Khanum, a Turkoman from the Mawsillu tribe. In 1524, Shah Ismail I died and was succeeded by his son Shah Tahmasp I, who was the full brother of Bahram Mirza. The two brothers had a close relationship, with Shah Tahmasp I frequently seeking Bahram Mirza's advice.

== Career ==
In keeping with Safavid tradition, Bahram Mirza was given the governorship of many provinces, under the supervision of a guardian who held the real authority. In 1530, he succeeded his brother Sam Mirza as governor of Herat, with Ghazi Khan Takkalu as his guardian. In the spring of 1532, an Uzbek army under Ubaydallah Khan laid siege to Herat. The main reason the Iranian army was able to endure this protracted siege was because they were provided with food by Uzbeks who disliked Ubaydallah Khan. As a result, in October 1533, Ubaydallah Khan lifted the siege and withdrew.

The following month, Shah Tahmasp I reached Herat, where he had Bahram Mirza and Ghazi Khan Takkalu replaced with Sam Mirza, who had Aghzivar Khan Shamlu as his guardian. Over the ensuing years, Bahram Mirza participated actively in the war with the Ottoman Empire who had invaded Iran. He took part in the clashes in the Azerbaijan province in 1534, and the next year he pressured the Ottoman soldiers that attempted to retake the Iranian territory they had briefly occupied in 1534.

In 1536/37, Shah Tahmasp I attempted to extend Safavid control by taking advantage of the death of the Kar-Kiya ruler of eastern Gilan, Soltan-Hasan Kiya. He appointed Bahram Mirza as the governor of Gilan and gave him the task of imposing Safavid authority with the help of a sizable army. During his brief time as governor, Bahram Mirza encountered strong opposition; as mass uprisings started, he fled to Qazvin. According to the modern historian Colin P. Mitchell; "This probably did not make a favourable impression on his older brother". His next known appointment as governor was in 1546, when he succeeded Abdollah Khan Ustajlu as the governor of Hamadan, with Cheragh Soltan Gerampa Ustajlu as his guardian.

Bahram Mirza played a key-role in dealing with the rebellion of his brother Alqas Mirza, who invaded mainland Iran with Ottoman support. In 1548, while Bahram Mirza was away, Alqas Mirza raided Hamadan and captured his family, whom he had sent to Baghdad (they later returned after Alqas Mirza's death). Alqas Mirza and his soldiers were soon chased across central Iran by Bahram Mirza in coordination with Ibrahim Dhu'l-Qadar, the governor of Shiraz. In 1549 at the town of Marivan, Alqas Mirza surrendered to Bahram Mirza. He was taken to the court of Shah Tahmasp I, who had him imprisoned in the Qahqaheh Castle. Bahram Mirza died during this period, on 11 October 1549 in one of the villages of the Kurdistan province, possibly due to an overdose of opium. He was buried in Mashhad. On 9 April 1550, Alqas Mirza was killed by being thrown from the castle.

== Cultural patronage ==
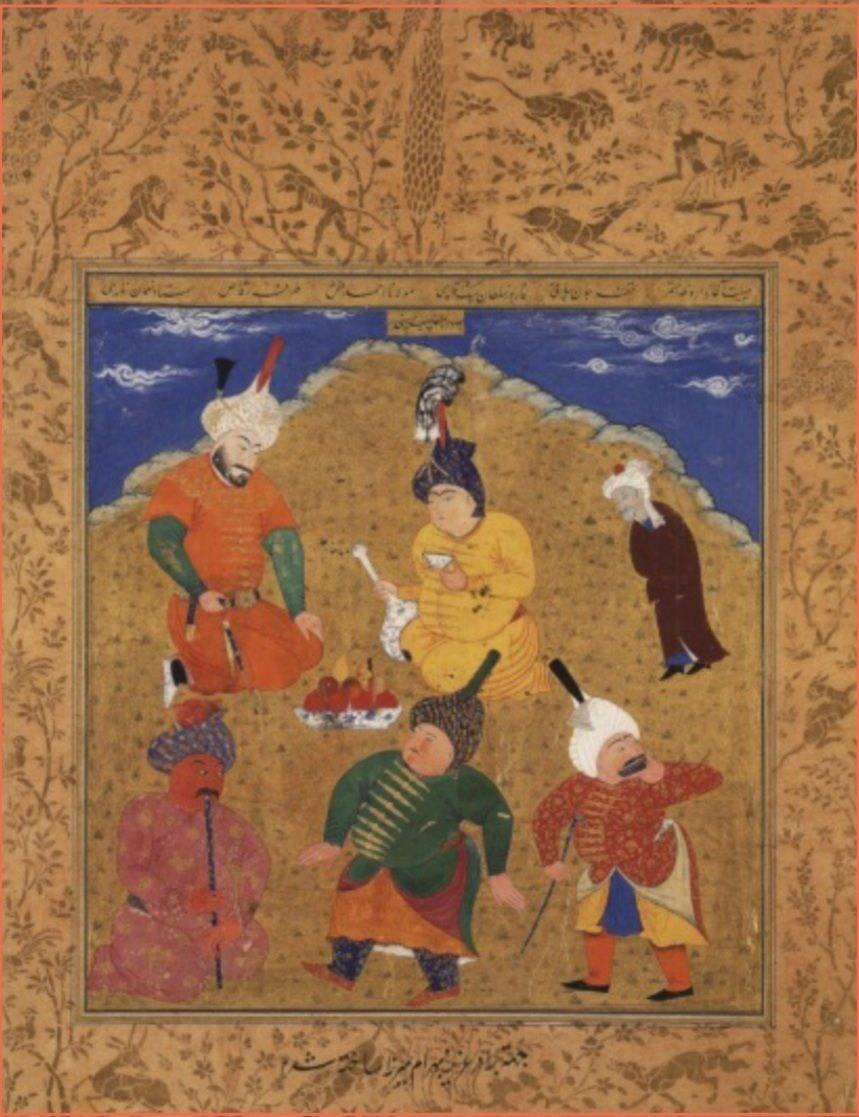
Satirical Safavid court scene, painted by Shah Tahmasp I himself in c. 1520–30, as a frontispiece for Bahram Mirza's art collection, the Bahram Mirza Album.

A notable patron of the arts, Bahram Mirza was also a talented calligrapher, painter, poet, and musician. In his poems, he used the pen names of "Bahram" and "Bahrami". Some of the same painters and calligraphers appear to have worked for both him and Shah Tahmasp I, suggesting that their artistic preferences were similar. The primary calligrapher for Bahram Mirza was Rostam-Ali Khorasani, a nephew of the distinguished painter Kamal ud-Din Behzad. A garden pavilion built by Bahram Mirza featured figural wall paintings by two prominent Safavid court artists, Aqa Mirak and Mir Musavvir.

Bahram Mirza entrusted Dust Mohammad Haravi with the task of compiling his art collection into an album, which he completed between 1543 and 1545. Known as the Bahram Mirza Album, it has been kept in the Topkapı Palace in Istanbul since the second half of the 16th century. It appears to have had a significant influence on Safavid Iran's perception of a unique Persian artistic style. It includes works by various distinguished artists such as Kamal ud-Din Behzad, Ahmad Musa, Abd al-Hayy, Jafar Tabrizi, Sultan Ali Mashhadi, Shah Mahmud Nishapuri, and Anisi. The double-spread introduction of the album, which is typically devoted to court portraits, features an image of Ali, further emphasizing the Safavids' spiritual heritage from him. In the preface, Ali is referred to as the "first Islamic painter". The album also contains numerous Chinese paintings, which is not specifically mentioned in the preamble.

Bahram Mirza also employed historians, such as Budaq Monshi Qazvini, the author of the Javaher al-akhbar ("Jewels of the histories"), and Yahya ibn Abd al-Latif Hoseyni Qazvini, the author of the Lobb al-tavarikh ("The essence of histories").

== Family ==
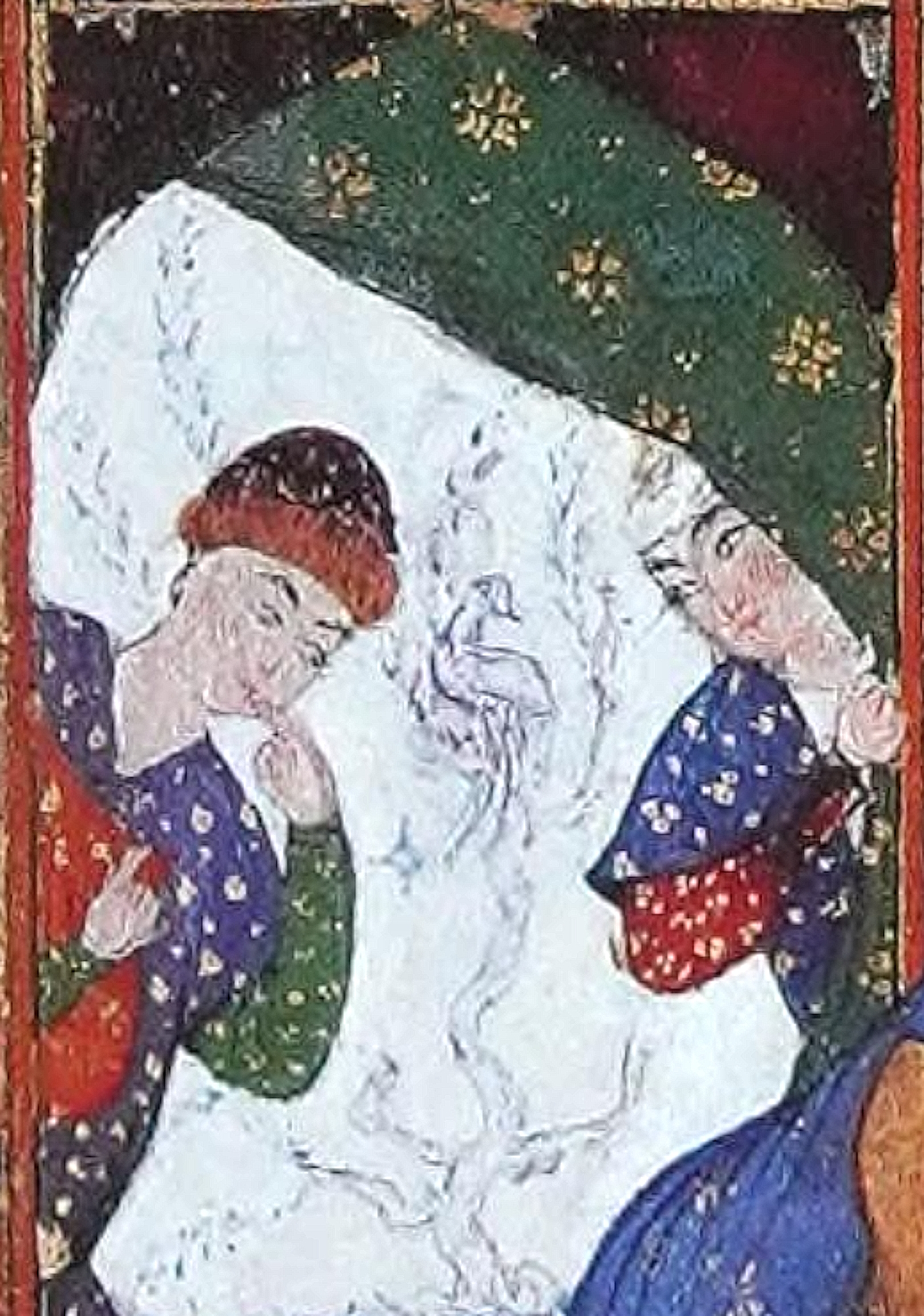
Possible depiction of Bahram Mirza and Princess Sultanum. 1531 painting.

Bahram Mirza's only known wife was Zaynab Sultan Khanum, a noblewoman from Shirvan. She died at Qazvin in October 1570, and was buried in Mashhad. She was the mother of his son, Ibrahim Mirza, a patron of arts who held the governorship of Mashhad twice in the 1560s. It is uncertain if she was also the mother of Bahram Mirza's two other sons; Soltan Hosayn Mirza, who held the governorship of Kandahar; and Badi-al Zaman Mirza Safavi, who held the governorship of Sistan. Ibrahim Mirza and Badi-al Zaman Mirza were later killed in 1577 under the orders of Shah Ismail II (r. 1576–1577), either due to paranoia from constant drug usage or to ensure his rule would not be threatened. Soltan Hosayn Mirza also died in the same year but without Shah Ismail II's intervention.

== Sources ==
- Amanat, Abbas (2017). Iran: A Modern History. Yale University Press. ISBN 978-0300112542.
- Balafrej, Lamia (1 April 2019). Making of the Artist in Late Timurid Painting. Edinburgh University Press. ISBN 978-1-4744-3746-2.
- Fleischer, C. (1989). "Alqās Mirza". In Yarshater, Ehsan (ed.). Encyclopædia Iranica. Vol. III: Ātaš–Bayhaqī, Ẓahīr-al-Dīn. London and New York: Routledge & Kegan Paul. pp. 907–909. ISBN 978-0-71009-121-5.
- Floor, Willem (2008). Titles and Emoluments in Safavid Iran: A Third Manual of Safavid Administration, by Mirza Naqi Nasiri. Mage Publishers. ISBN 978-1933823232.
- Ghereghlou, Kioumars (2016). "Esmāʿil II". Encyclopaedia Iranica.
- Mahdavi, Maleeha; Mayani, Yadullah Gholami (2019). "بهرام میرزای صفوی". The Great Islamic Encyclopaedia (in Persian).
- Mitchell, Colin P. (2009). "Tahmāsp I". In Yarshater, Ehsan (ed.). Encyclopædia Iranica (Online ed.). Encyclopædia Iranica Foundation.
- Mitchell, Colin P. (2012). "Bahrām Mīrzā". In Fleet, Kate; Krämer, Gudrun; Matringe, Denis; Nawas, John; Rowson, Everett (eds.). Encyclopaedia of Islam (3rd ed.). Brill Online. ISSN 1873-9830.
- Parodi, Laura E. (2018). "Shah Abul-Maali, Mir Sayyid ali, and the Sayyids of Tirmiz: Three Portraits Challenge Akbari Historiography". Muqarnas. 35: 140, note 4. ISSN 0732-2992.
- Roemer, H. R. (2008). "The Safavid period". The Cambridge History of Iran, Volume 6: The Timurid and Safavid Periods. Cambridge: Cambridge University Press. pp. 189–350. ISBN 9781139054980.
- Roxburgh, David J. (2005). The Persian album, 1400-1600 : from dispersal to collection. New Haven : Yale University Press. p. 247. ISBN 978-0-300-10325-0.
- Savory, Roger M.; Karamustafa, Ahmet T. (1998). "Esmāʿīl I Ṣafawī". In Yarshater, Ehsan (ed.). Encyclopædia Iranica. Vol. VIII/6: Eršād al-zerāʿa–Eʿteżād-al-Salṭana. London and New York: Routledge & Kegan Paul. pp. 628–636. ISBN 978-1-56859-055-4.
- Simpson, Marianna S. (1997). "Ebrāhīm Mīrzā". In Yarshater, Ehsan (ed.). Encyclopædia Iranica. Vol. VIII/1: Ebn ʿAyyāš–Economy V. London and New York: Routledge & Kegan Paul. pp. 74–75. ISBN 978-1-56859-050-9.
- Simpson, Marianna S.; Simpson-Shreve, M.; Farhad, M. (1997). Sultan Ibrahim Mirza's Haft Awrang: A Princely Manuscript from Sixteenth-Century Iran. Yale University Press. ISBN 978-0300068023.
- Soucek, P. (1988). "Bahrām Mīrzā". In Yarshater, Ehsan (ed.). Encyclopædia Iranica. Vol. III/5: Bahai Faith III–Baḵtīārī tribe II. London and New York: Routledge & Kegan Paul. pp. 523–524. ISBN 978-0-71009-117-8.
- Soudavar, Abolala (1 January 1999). "Between the Safavids and the Mughals: Art and Artists in Transition". Iran (Journal of the British Institute of Persian Studies). 37 (1): 66ff, plaque XVIa, XVIb. doi:10.1080/05786967.1999.11834598. ISSN 0578-6967.
- Soudavar, Abolala (1992). Art of the Persian Courts: Selections from the Art and History Trust Collection. New York: Rizzoli. p. 154. ISBN 978-0847816606.
- Weis, Friederike (2020). "How the Persian Qalam Caused the Chinese Brush to Break: The Bahram Mirza Album Revisited". Muqarnas Online. 37 (1): 63–109. doi:10.1163/22118993-00371P04. S2CID 230660318.
