= Gohar Sultan Begum =

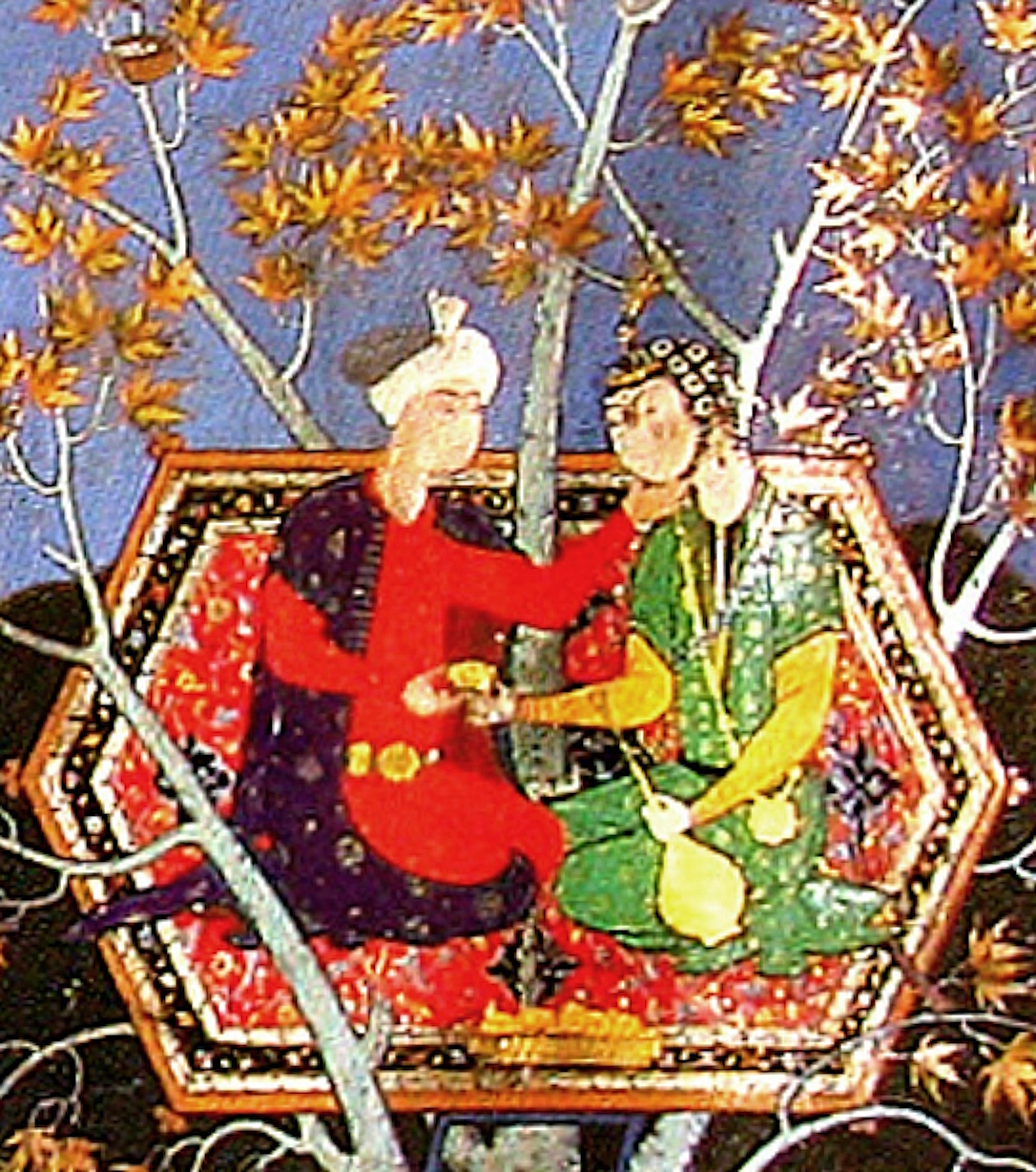
- Ibrahim Mirza with his wife Gohar Sultan Begum on a bed in a tree. Haft Awrang of Jami, 1571-72, Mashad, Iran (Topkapi Sarai Museum, H.1483).
- Born: 1540; Qazvin, Safavid Iran
- Died: 19 May 1577 (aged 37); Qazvin, Safavid Iran
- Spouse: Ibrahim Mirza
- Issue: Goharshad Begum
- House: Safavid
- Father: Tahmasp I
- Mother: Sultanum Begum
- Religion: Shia Islam

Gohar Sultan Begum (also Gauhar Sultan Begum, Gawhar-Sultan Khanim, Gawhar Sultan Khanum) (died 1577) was the daughter of shah Tahmasp I of Persia (r. 1524–1576).

She was sister to shah Ismail II.

She was married to her father's nephew, Ibrahim Mirza, whom she supported against her brother. The marriage most likely occurred in 1556. Gauhar Sultan Khanum gained admiration for her learning. Tradition holds that she died of grief after her husband was killed.
