= Zaynab Sultan Khanum =

16th century Safavid princess

Zaynab Sultan Khanum was a Safavid princess of the 16th century. She was the wife of Bahram Mirza Safavi, son of Shah Ismail, and was the mother of Prince Ibrahim Mirza.

She was a member of the old line of Shirvanshahs, a local Persian dynasty of great antiquity, claiming pre-Islamic ancestry. At that time, local Persian line were not yet fully integrated in the Safavid system, but started to gain more influence within the struggle between the Safavids and the Qizilbash. For the Safavid, such marital alliances with Persians tended to give them local legitimacy and power.

== Sources ==
- Soudavar, Abolala (1992). Art of the Persian Courts: Selections from the Art and History Trust Collection. New York: Rizzoli. p. 154. ISBN 978-0847816606.
