= Budaq Monshi Qazvini =

Persian composer

- Born: 1510/11; Qazvin, Safavid Iran
- Occupations: Bureaucrat and historian
- Relatives: Khvaja Ruh-Allah Shalkani Qazvini (maternal grandfather); Amir Beg Shalkani Qazvini (maternal uncle); Khvaja Ezz-al-Din Shalkani (brother)
- Writing career
- Language: Persian
- Notable work: Javaher al-akhbar

Budaq Monshi Qazvini (Persian: بوداق منشی قزوینی), was a bureaucrat and historian in 16th-century Safavid Iran, who composed the universal history Javaher al-akhbar, which focuses on a significant portion of the Persianate world.

Born in 1510/11, Budaq came from a distinguished family based in Qazvin. During the reign of the Aq Qoyunlu ruler Baysunghur (r. 1490–1493), Budaq's maternal grandfather Khvaja Ruh-Allah Shalkani Qazvini held the position of vizier. Budaq's maternal uncle also served as vizier under the Safavid governor of Baghdad, Mohammad Khan Takkalu Sharaf-al-Din Oghlu. Both Budaq and his brother Khvaja Ezz-al-Din Shalkani worked in the administration of the Safavid government, the former in the financial section. Budaq's Javaher al-akhbar features a section that goes into depth regarding his career, containing the majority of what is known about him. In 1525/26, Budaq became a scribe in the royal secretariat. A few years later, he started working as a copyist and eventually assumed supervision of the financial registers as well.

In 1530/31, Budaq joined his uncle in Baghdad and worked there as a secretary of the divan. He also later became the nevisanda-ye lashkar of Mohammad Khan Takkalu. He likely left Baghdad in 1534, due to the invasion of the Ottoman emperor Suleiman the Magnificent during the Ottoman–Safavid War of 1532–1555. Following Mohammad Khan Takkalus appointment as the governor of Herat in 1537, he dismissed Budaq as his nevisande-ye lashkar. Budaq went to Qazvin, where he soon started working for Bahram Mirza Safavi, the brother of Shah Tahmasp I (r. 1524–1576). Later, due to the influence of Bahram Mirza's vizier Mir Enayat-Allah Khvari, Budaq was dismissed by Bahram Mirza.

After Budaq had been unemployed for six years, Bahram Mirza accepted him back into his service, making him the kalantar (mayor) of three districts close to Qazvin. During Suleiman's second campaign against Iran in 1548/49, Budaq accompanied the Safavid army with the goal of stopping him. However, Budaq omits this event entirely, focusing exclusively on his administrative roles.

== Sources ==
- Aldous, Gregory (2021). "The Qazvin Period and the Idea of the Safavids". In Melville, Charles (ed.). Safavid Persia in the Age of Empires, the Idea of Iran Vol. 10. Bloomsbury Publishing. pp. 29–46. ISBN 978-0755633777.
- Floor, Willem (2008). Titles and Emoluments in Safavid Iran: A Third Manual of Safavid Administration, by Mirza Naqi Nasiri. Mage Publishers. ISBN 978-1933823232.
- Quinn, Sholeh A. (2021). "Safavid Historiography: The place of the Safavids in the Iranian history". In Matthee, Rudi (ed.). The Safavid World. Routledge. pp. 164–182. ISBN 978-1138944060.
- Trausch, Tilmann (2015). "Budāq Monši Qazvini". Encyclopaedia Iranica. Brill Publishers.
