= Maasir-i-Alamgiri =

18th-century Indo-Persian history of Mughal emperor Aurangzeb

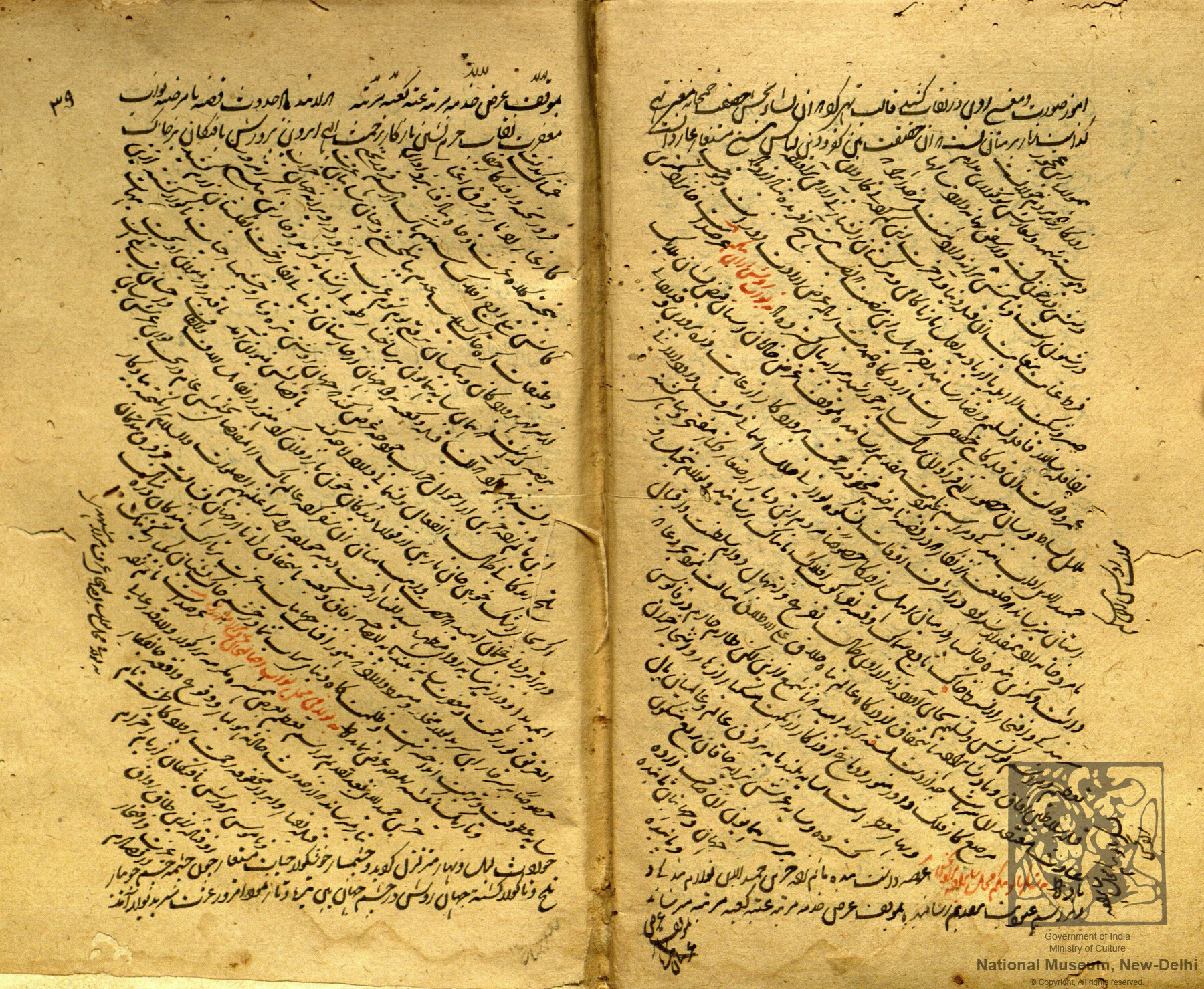
Folio from a manuscript of the Maasir-i-Alamgiri, dated to 1177 AH (1763/1764 CE)

The Ma'asir-i-Alamgiri (lit. 'Heroic deeds of Alamgir'), also transcribed as Ma'athir-i-Alamgiri, is a Persian-language chronicle of Mughal emperor Aurangzeb Alamgir's reign. It was completed in 1710 by Musta'id Khan, an administrator in the Mughal court, three years after Aurangzeb's death. It is considered one of the main primary sources of Aurangzeb's reign by scholars of the Mughal Empire.

== Writing ==
The author of the Ma'asir, Muhammad Musta'id Khan, was born in Ahmadnagar and raised by foster father Bakhtawar Khan, who served as emperor Aurangzeb's personal attendant and authored a chronicle titled Mirat-ul-Alam. Musta'id Khan served as Bakhtawar Khan's diwan and munshi. After Bakhtawar Khan's death, Musta'id Khan entered the imperial service, and from 1685 onwards served in various administrative positions of the court, overseeing sectors like the royal painting atelier, carpet-weaving workshop, and treasury. For this reason scholar Sajida Alvi characterizes him as being an eyewitness to the Mughal court during the reign of Aurangzeb.

Aurangzeb enacted a ban on the compilation of official histories, a longstanding tradition in the Mughal court, which brought to a halt the work of Aurangzeb's official historian Muhammad Kazim after having chronicled a decade of the emperor's rule. This ten-year official chronicle is known as the Alamgirnamah. Musta'id Khan himself explained the ban as a result of Aurangzeb wanting to curtail ostentatious displays of the court, while Indian historian Jadunath Sarkar opined that this was more likely due to increasing financial difficulties in Aurangzeb's administration. Following Aurangzeb's death in 1707, his former secretary and senior member of the Mughal court Inayat Allah Khan persuaded Musta'id Khan to write a history of Aurangzeb's complete reign, and gave him access to the Mughal state's archives to assist the latter. The Ma'asir-i-Alamgiri was completed in 1710, when Musta'id Khan presented his finished work to his patron Inayat Allah Khan.

== Content ==
The Ma'asir is a Persian-language history of emperor Aurangzeb's rule. It has two parts. The first part, by Musta'id Khan's own characterisation, is an abridgment of the ten-year official chronicle Alamgirnamah. Alvi notes that this section also seems to use content from the Mirat-ul-Alam. The second part covers the last forty regnal years and is based mainly on Musta'id Khan's own experiences as well as his first-hand questioning of other eyewitnesses. It also makes use of various official documents sourced from the Mughal archives, such as imperial decrees and royal correspondence. Like other contemporary histories, the Ma'asir portrays Aurangzeb as a champion of Islam. Unlike some contemporary histories and the official chronicles of previous emperors, the Ma'asir does not use a panegyric or floral tone, and instead uses plain language. According to Kulke, the Ma'asir also gives suggestions for an improved political administration targeted at Aurangzeb's successor Shah Alam I. In the view of historian Audrey Truschke, the historical accuracy of the Ma'asir is impacted by the fact that it uses several hearsay accounts and relies on the author's recollection of past events.

== Legacy ==
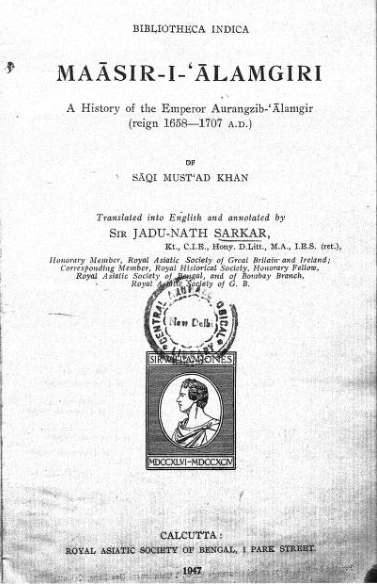
Jadunath Sarkar's translation of the Maasir

The Ma'asir is a key primary source of Aurangzeb's reign. The Persian text was edited by Maulvi Agha Ahmad Ali and published by Bibliotheca Indica. It was subsequently translated into English by historian Jadunath Sarkar in 1947, which contributed to its popularity among scholars of this historical period. The text is often cited in Mughal scholarship to support views of Aurangzeb's reign as a religiously divisive period.
