= Bakhtawar Khan Mohammad =

Bakhtawar Khan Mohammad or simply Bakhtawar, (Persian: بختاور خان محمد, born 1620 in Persia; died February 19, 1685, in Delhi) was a Persian historian, poet, official and later also personal advisor of the king at the court of the Mughal emperor Aurangzeb.

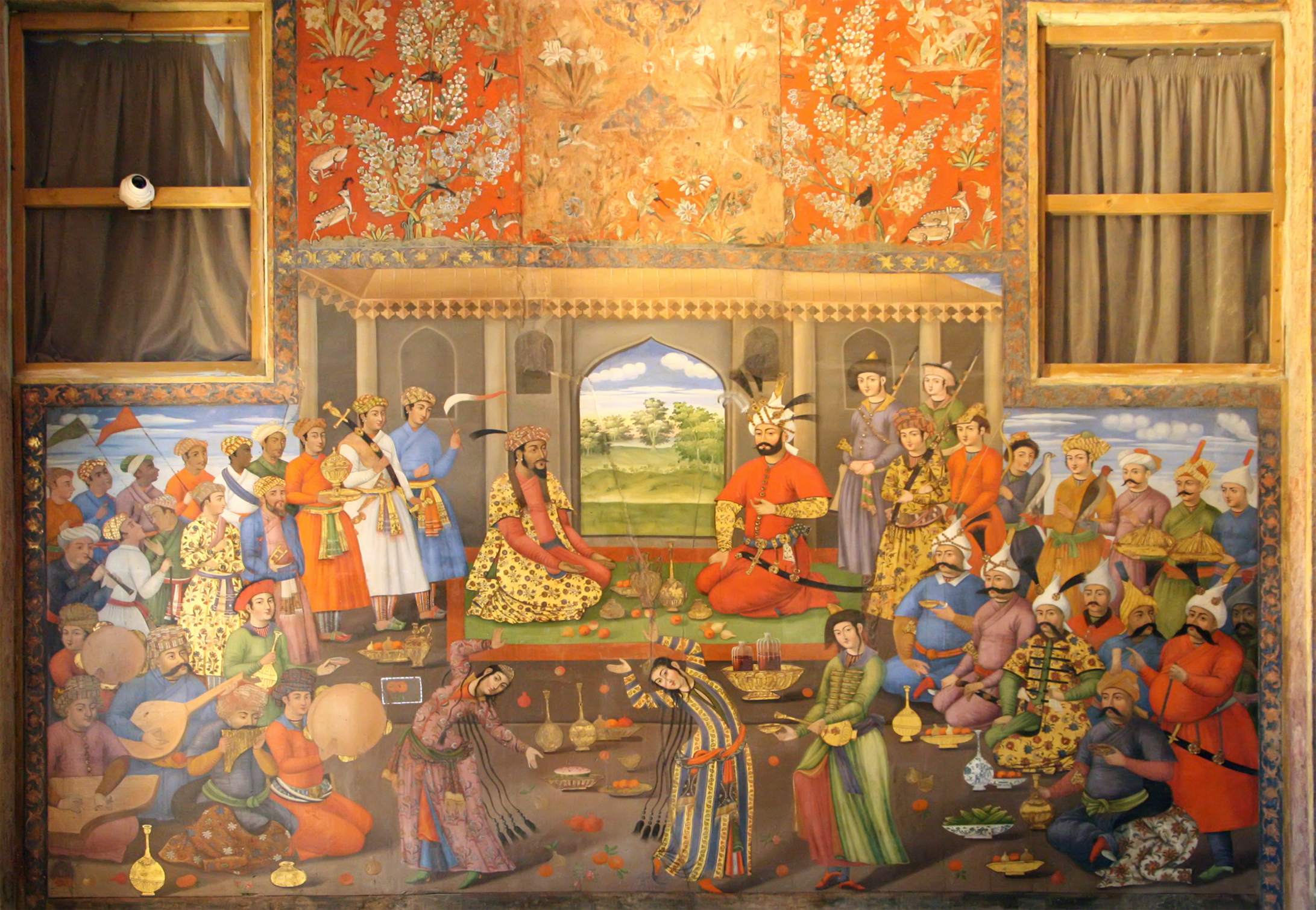
Mughal emperor Humayun at the court of the Shah of Persia Tahmasp I at the celebration of the Nowruz Festival with music, dance, poetry and wine-drinking.

== Early life ==
Like many Persian poets, traders and nobles in the Early modern period, Bakhtawar's family migrated from Persia to the Mughal Empire, where Persian-speaking people in particular were in great demand at the Mughal court and made up an important part of the nobility.

== See also ==
- Persians in the Mughal Empire

== Literature ==
- S. S. Alvi, “The Historians of Awrangzeb: A Comparative Study of Three Primary Sources,” Essays on Islamic Civilization, ed. D. P. Little, Leiden, 1976, pp. 57–73.
- Bakhtāwar Khān, Mirʾāt al-ʿĀlam: History of Emperor Awrangzeb ʿĀlamgīr, ed. S. S. Alvi, I-II, Lahore, 1979.
- H. M. Elliot, The History of India as Told by Its Own Historians, ed. J. Dowson, London, 1877, VIII, pp. 150–53.
- Mostaʿed Khan, Maʾāṯer-e ʿālamgīrī, Eng. tr. Jadunath Sarkar, Calcutta, 1947, pp. 59, 61, 142, 155.
- Moḥammad-Afżal Sarḵoš, Kalemāt al-šoʿarāʾ, Lahore, n.d., pp. 25–26. EI^{2} I, p. 954.
- Rieu, Pers. Man. I, pp. 124–27; III, pp. 890–91, 975.
- Storey, I, pp. 132–33, 517, 1012.
