= Javaher al-akhbar =

16th-century Persian universal history

The Javaher al-akhbar (Persian: جواهر الاخبار, romanized: The Jewels of Histories) is a Persian universal history composed by the Safavid bureaucrat and historian Budaq Monshi Qazvini in 1577. It focuses on a significant portion of the Persianate world. Only the section covering Safavid history has been published, which is still considered to be important as it provides a detailed account of the author's role as a secretary at the court of Shah Tahmasp I (r. 1524–1576), thus offering insights into the lives of bureaucrats of that era.

A single manuscript containing the text is stored in the Library of the Russian Academy of Sciences. Copies of this manuscript are also stored in the National Library and Archives of Iran and the library of the University of Tehran.

== Sources ==
- Aldous, Gregory (2021). "The Qazvin Period and the Idea of the Safavids". In Melville, Charles (ed.). Safavid Persia in the Age of Empires, the Idea of Iran Vol. 10. Bloomsbury Publishing. pp. 29–46. ISBN 978-0755633777.
- Quinn, Sholeh A. (2021). "Safavid Historiography: The place of the Safavids in the Iranian history". In Matthee, Rudi (ed.). The Safavid World. Routledge. pp. 164–182. ISBN 978-1138944060.
- Trausch, Tilmann (2015). "Budāq Monši Qazvini". Encyclopaedia Iranica. Brill Publishers.
- Trausch, Tilmann (2021). "Continuing a legacy in times of change". In Matthee, Rudi (ed.). The Safavid World. Routledge. pp. 182–200. ISBN 978-1138944060.
