= Soltan Hosayn Mirza Safavi =

Safavid prince and governor of Qandahar (1558–1577)

Soltan Hosayn Mirza
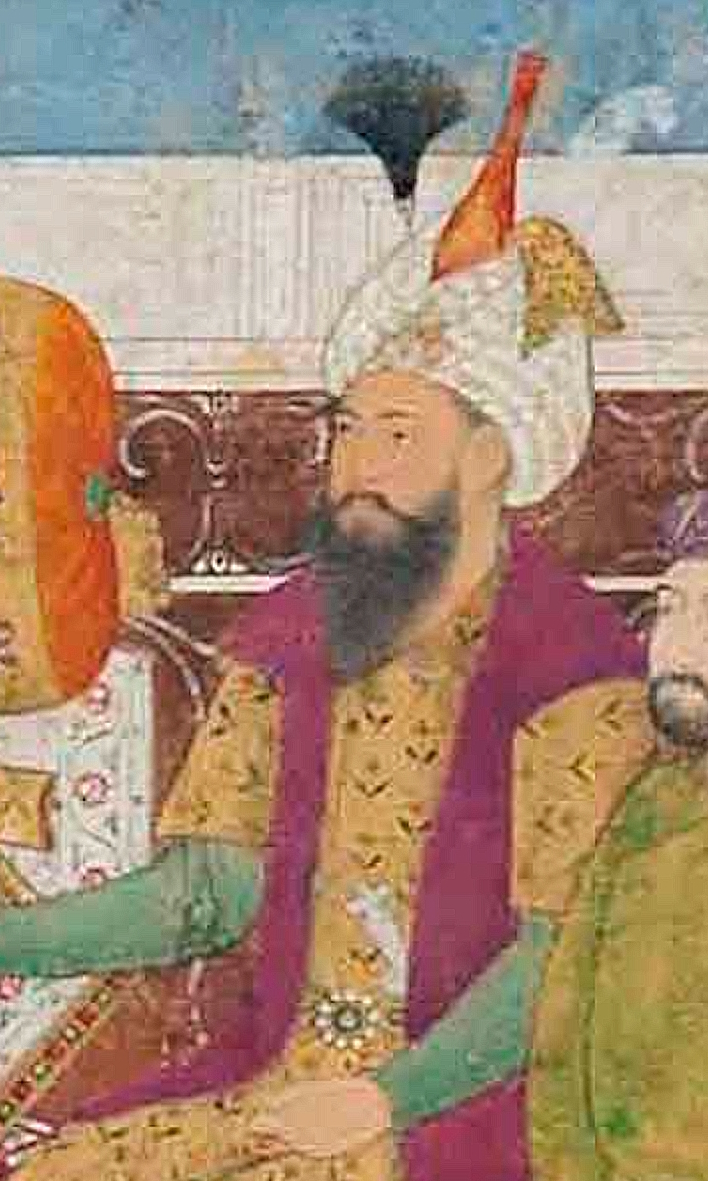
- Portrait of Soltan Hosayn Mirza. Made in Mughal India in c. 1650–60

Governor of Qandahar
- Tenure: 1558–1577
- Successor: Fulad Khalifa Shamlu
- Died: 1577; Qandahar
- Issue: Mozaffar-Hosayn Mirza; Rustam Mirza
- Dynasty: Safavid
- Father: Bahram Mirza Safavi

Soltan Hosayn Mirza Safavi (Persian: سلطان حسین میرزا; d. 1577) was a prince of the Safavid dynasty of Iran who ruled as the governor of Qandahar from 1558 until his death in 1577. He was a son of Bahram Mirza and a grandson of Ismail I. His descendants formed a cadet branch of the Safavid dynasty in the Mughal India that survived there for two centuries and became one of the most prominent families in the Mughal court.

== Biography ==
Map of Safavid Iran and the surrounding Ottoman and Mughal empires

A son of Bahram Mirza (the youngest son of Ismail I, the first Safavid shah of Iran), Soltan Hosayn Mirza had two brothers, Ibrahim Mirza and Badi-al Zaman Mirza. His date and place of birth are unknown, but he was older than Ibrahim. Contemporary chronicler Hasan Beg Rumlu records that in 1553, during the Ottoman–Safavid War, Soltan Hosayn fought the Ottomans in Kurdistan. The Safavid shah (Soltan Hosayn's uncle) Tahmasp I, betrothed one of his daughters to him, though the two never married.

In 1543, Humayun, the Mughal emperor, fled from India to the court of Tahmasp I after losing his realm to Sher Shah Suri, the founder of the Sur Empire, and facing his brothers' rebellions. With the Safavid aid, he conquered the city of Qandahar (now in modern-day Afghanistan) in 1545, and then expelled the Safavid army, despite his previous promise to cede the city to the shah. Humayun's death in 1556 and the weakening of Mughal power in the region gave Tahmasp an opportunity to seize Qandahar in 1558. Soltan Hosayn, who played a major role in the conquest, was awarded with the governorship of the city. He also had control over Zamindawar and Garmsir.

Tahmasp died in 1576 and was succeeded by his son, Ismail II. According to Safavid astrologer Jalal al-Din Yazdi (d. 1618), Soltan Hosayn declared himself the King of Qandahar, struck coins and had a khutba (Friday sermon) to be read in his name when he heard the news of Tahmasp's death. Ismail put Ali-Qoli Mirza, one of the Soltan Hosayn's sons, under house arrest. In 1577, Soltan Hosayn suddenly died. Contemporary chronicles give different causes for his death; Iskandar Beg Munshi (1561/62–1633/34) states it was from natural causes; Mirza Beg Junabadi (d. 1625/26) writes that Soltan Hosayn committed suicide when he was informed that Ismail had sent an assassin after him, and according to Afushta'i Natanzi (fl. 16th century), Soltan Hosayn was murdered by the agents of Badi-al Zaman Mirza, who wished to extend his power from his appanage in Sistan to Qandahar. Badi-al Zaman was later killed on Ismail's order and Qandahar was granted to Fulad Khalifa of the Shamlu tribe, despite Soltan Hosayn's wish to pass his lands onto his sons. Ismail ordered Ali-Qoli Mirza to be blinded, however he underwent so much pain that Ismail was forced to order his death.

== Family ==
Soltan Hosayn had six children; five sons and one daughter. At the time of his death, four of his sons were in Qandahar: Mozaffar-Hosayn, Rustam, Abu Sa'id, and Sanjar. Ali-Qoli Mirza (in some sources Mohammad Hosayn) had been sent to the royal court at Qazvin along with his sister, Oghlan Pasha, where they were treated by Tahmasp like his own children. Oghlan Pash was married to Hamza Mirza, son of Mohammad Khodabanda, Ismail's successor. After Hamza's death in 1586, she married the future Abbas the Great and eventually died in his harem.

Mohammad Khodabanda restored Mozaffar-Hosayn and Rustam as the governors of Qandahar and Zamindawar respectively. The two sons eventually defected to India and joined the court of Akbar, Humayun's son, where they formed the Bahrami cadet branch of the Safavid dynasty. They became one of the most prominent families in the Mughal court, with frequent marital alliances with the imperial family and holding prestigious positions in the court. The Bahrami family survived in India for two centuries.

== Bibliography ==
=== Primary sources ===
- Munshi, Iskandar Beg (1978) [1629]. Tarikh-e Alam-ara-ye Abbasi [History of Shah 'Abbas the Great]. Persian Heritage Series. Vol. 1. Translated by Roger M., Savory. Boulder, Colorado: Westview Press. ISBN 9780891582960. OCLC 659933391.

=== Secondary sources ===
- Khan, Iqtida A. (1992). "Inter-state relations (c. 1500–1850)". In Palat, Madhavan K.; Tabyshalieva, Anara (eds.). Development in contrast, from the sixteenth to the mid-nineteenth century. History of civilizations of Central Asia. Vol. 5. Paris: UNESCO Publishing. pp. 325–335. ISBN 92-3-103876-1.
- Geevers, Liesbeth (2015). "Safavid Cousins on the Verge of Extinction: Dynastic Centralization in Central Asia and the Bahrāmī Collateral Line (1517-1593)". Journal of the Economic and Social History of the Orient. 58 (3). Leiden: Brill: 293–326. doi:10.1163/15685209-12341376. ISSN 1568-5209. JSTOR 43919246. OCLC 46849781.
- Afshar, Hamideh Malekpour; Sarafrazi, Abbas (2018). "نقش شاهزادگان صفوی در دربار مغولان هند" [Role of Safavid Princes in the court of Indian Mugals]. Journal of Subcontinent Researches (in Persian). 10 (35). Zahedan: University of Sistan and Baluchestan: 78–99. ISSN 2538-5062. OCLC 1430190247.
- Soucek, P. (1988). "Bahrām Mīrzā". In Yarshater, Ehsan (ed.). Encyclopædia Iranica. Vol. III/5: Bahai Faith III–Baḵtīārī tribe II. London and New York: Routledge & Kegan Paul. pp. 523–524. ISBN 978-0-71009-117-8.
- Matthee, Rudi; Mashita, Hiroyuki (2010). "Qandahar iv. From The Mongol Invasion Through the Safavid Era". In Yarshater, Ehsan (ed.). Encyclopædia Iranica. Vol. XV/5: Ḵamsa of Jamāli–Karim Devona. London and New York: Routledge & Kegan Paul. pp. 478–484. ISBN 978-1-934283-28-8.
