= Ibrahim Mirza =

Safavid prince (1540–1577)

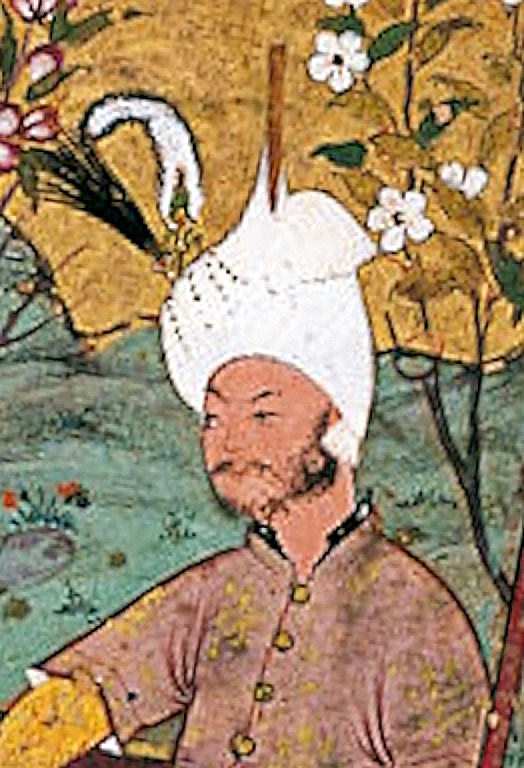
- Sultan Ibrahim Mirza in the finispiece from the Diwan of Sultan Ibrahim Mirza, 1582.

Governor of Mashhad
- 1st Tenure: 1556–1562
- 2nd Tenure: 1566–1568

Governor of Qa'en
- Tenure: 1562–1566

Governor of Sabzavār
- Tenure: 1568–1574
- Born: 1540
- Died: 1577 (aged 36–37)
- Spouse: Gohar Sultan Begum
- Issue: Goharshad Begum
- Dynasty: Safavid
- Father: Bahram Mirza Safavi
- Mother: Zaynab Sultan Khanum
- Religion: Twelver Shia Islam

Ibrahim Mirza, Solṭān Ebrāhīm Mīrzā, in full Abu'l Fat'h Sultan Ibrahim Mirza (Persian: ابوالفتح سلطان ابراهیم میرزا; April 1540 – 23 February 1577) was a Safavid prince who was a favourite of his uncle and father-in-law Shah Tahmasp I, but who was executed by Tahmasp's successor, Shah Ismail II. Ibrahim is now mainly remembered as a patron of the arts, especially the Persian miniature. Although most of his library and art collection was apparently destroyed by his wife after his murder, surviving works commissioned by him include the manuscript of the Haft Awrang of the poet Jami which is now in the Freer Gallery of Art in Washington D.C.

== Biography ==
Ibrahim Mirza was a grandson of the founder of the Safavid dynasty, Ismail I (1487–1524) by Ismail's fourth son, prince Bahram Mirza Safavi (1518–1550), who was governor of Khorasan (1529–32), Gilan (1536–37) and Hamadan (1546–49), and also a commissioner of manuscripts. Two of his uncles and two of his brothers rebelled against Ismail's successor, Tahmasp I. Ibrahim Mirza, however, who grew up at court, was a long-time favourite of Tahmasp, and remained loyal, and was appointed governor of Mashhad at the age of 16, arriving there in March 1556. The appointment had a nominal element — Tahmasp himself had received his first governorship at the age of four — but was also political, connected to Ibrahim Mirza's mother, who came from the Shirvanshah dynasty.

In 1560, he married Tahmasp's eldest daughter by a concubine, Gohar Sultan Begum (died 1577); they had one daughter, Gawhar Shad Begum (died 1587). Around the end of 1562 he was travelling to Ardabil to take up the governorship there, when he was reported to the shah for his reaction to a joke that angered the shah, and the appointment was switched to the much less important governorship of Qa'en, in Khorasan. In 1564 and 1565, he had to suppress a major tribal revolt of the Takkalu, who used a slave army numbering 10,000.

After a few years, Shah Tahmasp's anger had subsided, and Ibrahim Mirza was re-appointed Governor of Mashhad by 1566. He was removed again "within a year or two, apparently for his failure to assist in rescuing the shah’s besieged son, Solṭān Moḥammad Mīrzā". He was sent to govern Sabzevar until 1574 when, by now 34, he was recalled to the capital at Qazvin to serve as grand master of ceremonies (Eshik-aqasi-bashi). When Tahmasp died in 1576, Ibrahim Mirza was involved in the struggles at court over the succession, finally supporting the successful Ismail II, who appointed him keeper of the royal seal (mohrdār).

On 23 February 1577, Ibrahim Mirza was killed in Qazvin, along with several other princes, by the order of Ismail II in a general clear-out of potential rivals. As the new shah, Ismail II, who may have been mentally unstable after spending 20 years in prison, had soon alienated the Qizilbash who were powerful at court and especially his influential sister Pari Khan Khanum. The Qizilbash had begun to look to Ibrahim Mirza as a possible replacement for Ismail, who died on 24 November, supposedly after consuming poisoned opium.

== Patron of the arts ==
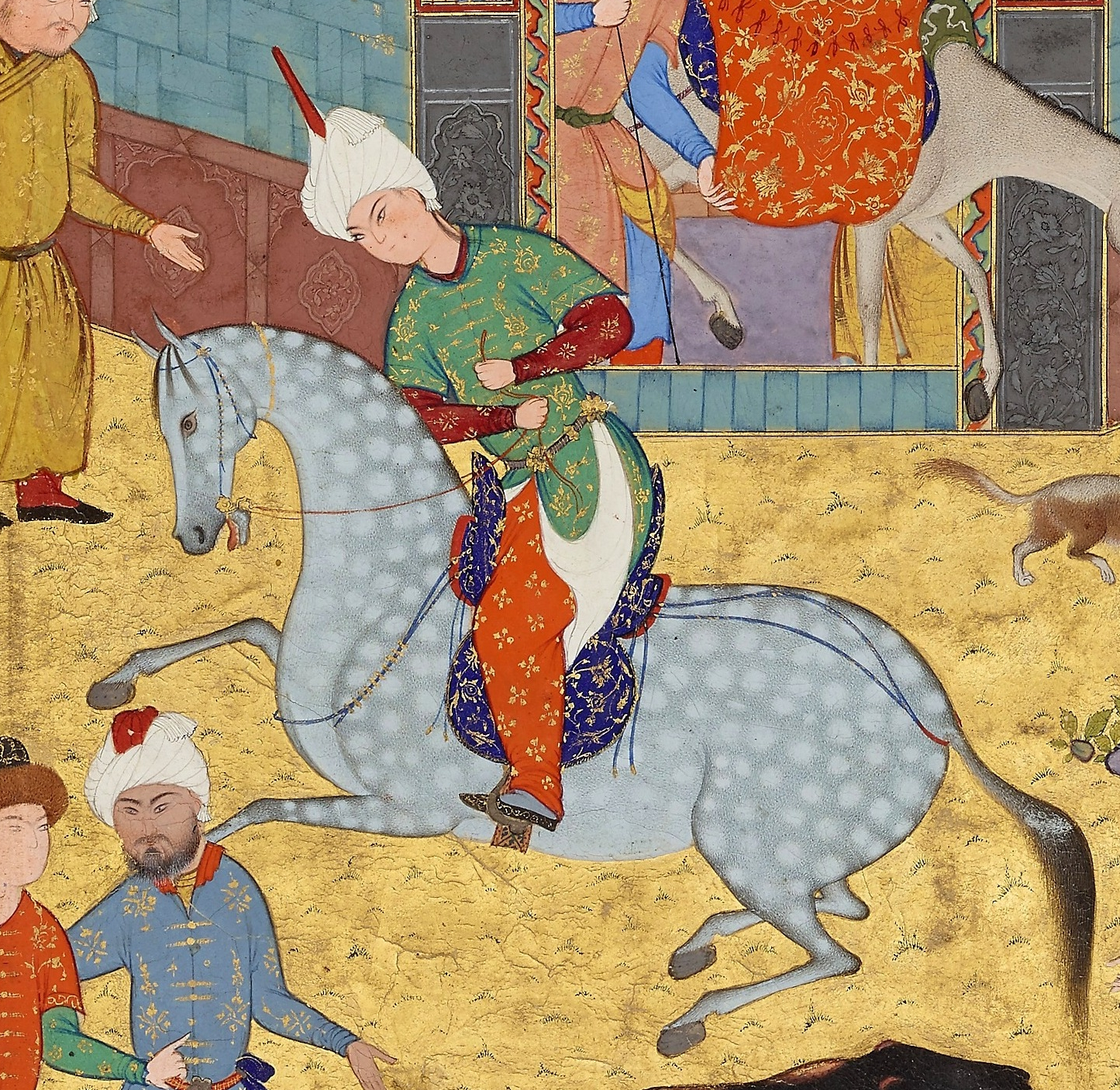
Ibrahim Mirza on horse, age 16, as young Governor of Mashhad. Detail of one of the first miniatures of his Haft Awrang of Jami. Painted circa 1556 by Mirza Ali.

Like other Safavid princes Ibrahim Mirza practiced as a poet, artist and calligrapher, and was a patron of poets, musicians and other artists, but he was especially important for the atelier he maintained for the production of illuminated manuscripts. When Shah Tahmasp, previously the leading patron of Persian painting at the time, ceased to commission manuscripts in the 1540s, Ibrahim Mirza's workshop was for a period the most important in Iran. As a poet he wrote several thousand lines, in Persian and Turkish.

The Freer Jami contains statements, by the two calligraphers who copied the text, that it was copied at Mashhad. Another source states that one of them, Malik al-Daylami, went with Ibrahim Mirza to Mashhad in 1556, and stayed for 18 months, before being recalled by the shah. He also tutored Ibrahim in calligraphy. Despite requests from the prince, Malik was not allowed back to Mashhad before his death in 1561 or 1562. The second calligrapher, Shah Mahmud Nishapuri, who had written the last major commission of Tahmasp, the Khamsa of Nizami, British Library Or. 2265, died in Mashad in 1564 or 1565.

There are 28 full-page miniatures, none signed or dated, but modern attributions (not always finding consensus among scholars) have been made to artists including Shaykh Muhammad, an important artist who is recorded as joining Ibrahim Mirza in Sabzavar, and after Ibrahim's death returned to working for the shahs. Shaykh Muhammad may have been responsible for the individualized faces in certain pictures, atypical of Persian painting, and looking forward to the Mughal miniature, a tradition that was beginning just in these years.

Other artists from Tahmasp's atelier joined the service of the Mughal emperor Humayun. Indeed, one artist, Mirza Ali, is claimed by Stuart Cary Welch and others to have contributed to the Freer Jami, while the theory of Barbara Brend that he was the same person as Abd al-Samad would place him working for Humayun and his son Akbar in just these years, first in Kabul and then in India. Another artist who worked for the prince was Ali Asghar, father of Reza Abbasi, the leading artist of the next generation, who was born around 1565, perhaps at Mashhad.

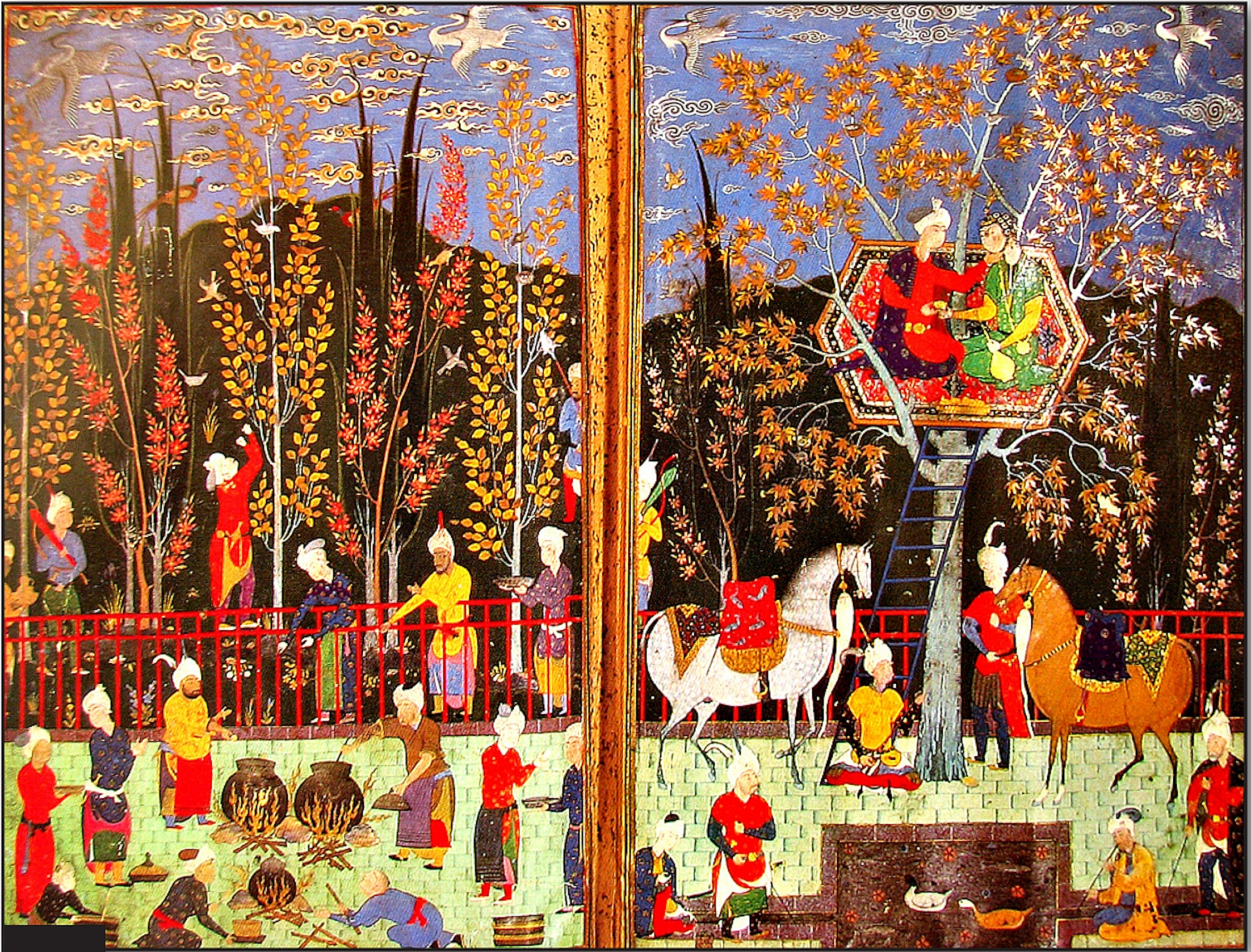
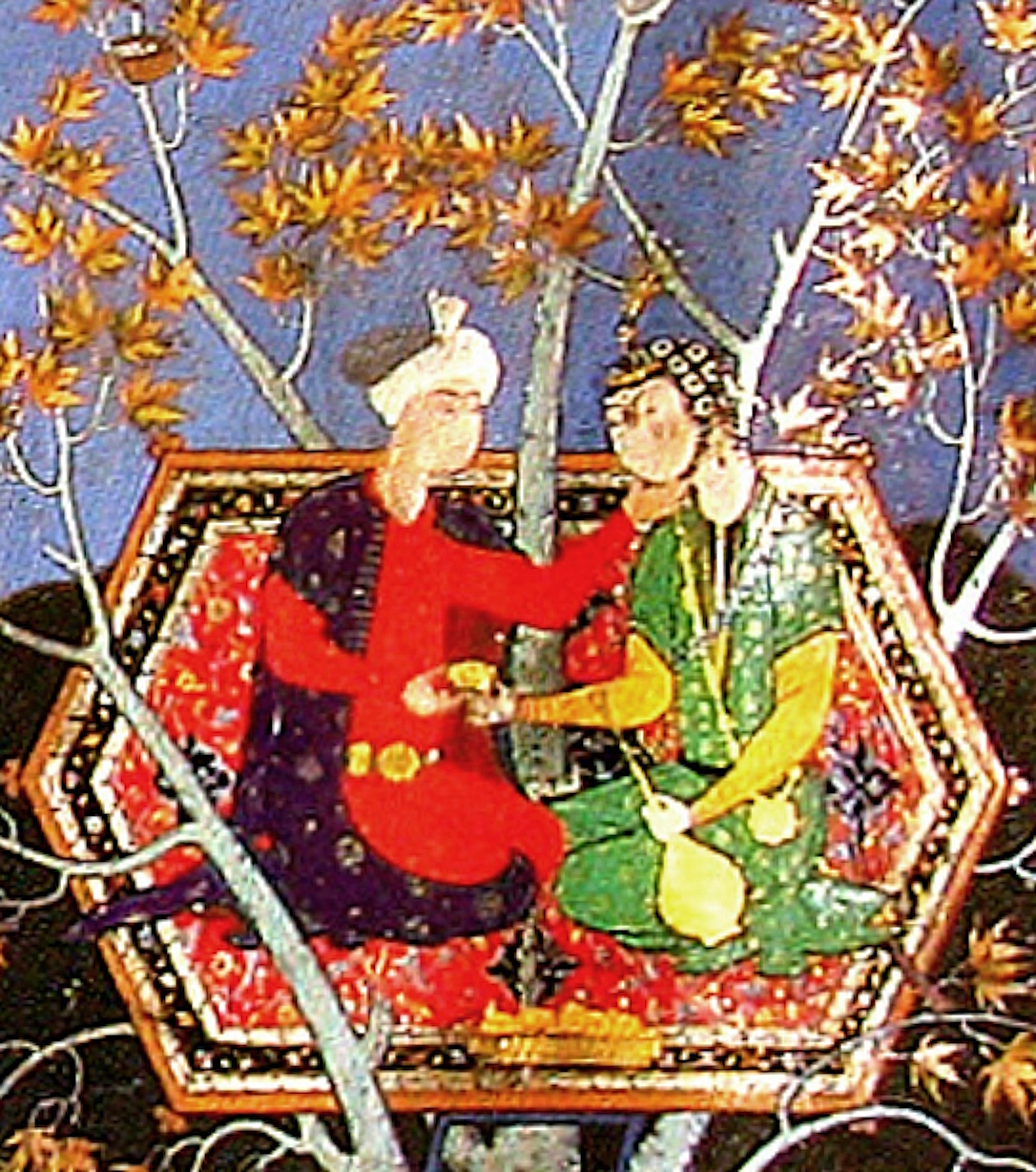
Frontispiece of Haft Awrang of Jami, with detail of Ibrahim Mirza and his wife Gohar Sultan Begum on a bed in a tree. 1571-72, Mashad, Iran (Topkapi Sarai Museum).

Welch suggests that some paintings were made in Qazvin by older artists, such as Aqa Mirak and Muzaffar Ali, who remained there and sent to Mashhad., but the account by another of the prince's calligraphers, Qazi Ahmad, though admittedly full of extravagant praise, makes it clear that Ibrahim Mirza took a good-sized contingent of artists and craftsmen with him to his posts, and spent much time among them. Other artists working on the manuscript have been given the titles of painters A and D, from their work on earlier manuscripts for Tahmasp. Ibrahim Mirza may also have commissioned manuscripts in Qazvin in the 1570s, the best period of production there. The miniatures in the book are crowded with figures, and in the example opposite textiles, too much so for many critics. It appears Ibrahim Mirza identified himself with Yusuf (Joseph) and the images of him are probably intended as portraits. The manuscript has been described as "the last truly great one produced under the Safavid dynasty".

For Barbara Brend:

Superficially the illustrations to Jami's stories are very similar to those of works for Tahmasp; they are complex compositions of a high level of finish, but there are more figures which are slightly grotesque, more youths with a slightly louche, pussycat smile, and a palette which admits more brown and purple tertiary colours. The eye is pulled restlessly over the page from detail to detail. It is as though the painters had lost confidence in the power of the ostensible narrative subject to interest the viewer, and were searching for other means to hold the attention. Innocence had been lost; the classic works would continue to be illustrated, but only as a vehicle for the painters' skill; they seem no longer to have a mythic hold on the imagination. The future of painting was to lie in more realistic subjects, though their treatment often disguises that realism from us.

After Ibrahim Mirza was murdered, his wife, who only survived him by three months, is recorded as having destroyed his library and personal possessions, washing the manuscripts in water, smashing what was probably Chinese porcelain, and burning other things. She also washed out a muraqqa or album, containing miniatures by Behzad among others, which her husband had compiled and given her for their wedding. Perhaps she did not want anything to fall into the hands of her brother, who had ordered his death, and who did take over the prince's atelier. Only two manuscripts commissioned by Ibrahim Mirza have survived, the Freer Jami and a much more "modest" manuscript of 1574, now in the Topkapi Palace in Istanbul, with just two illustrations. In 1582, his daughter compiled a book containing his poetry, with some miniatures, which survives in two copies, one in the Aga Khan Museum and the other in the Golestan Palace library in Tehran.

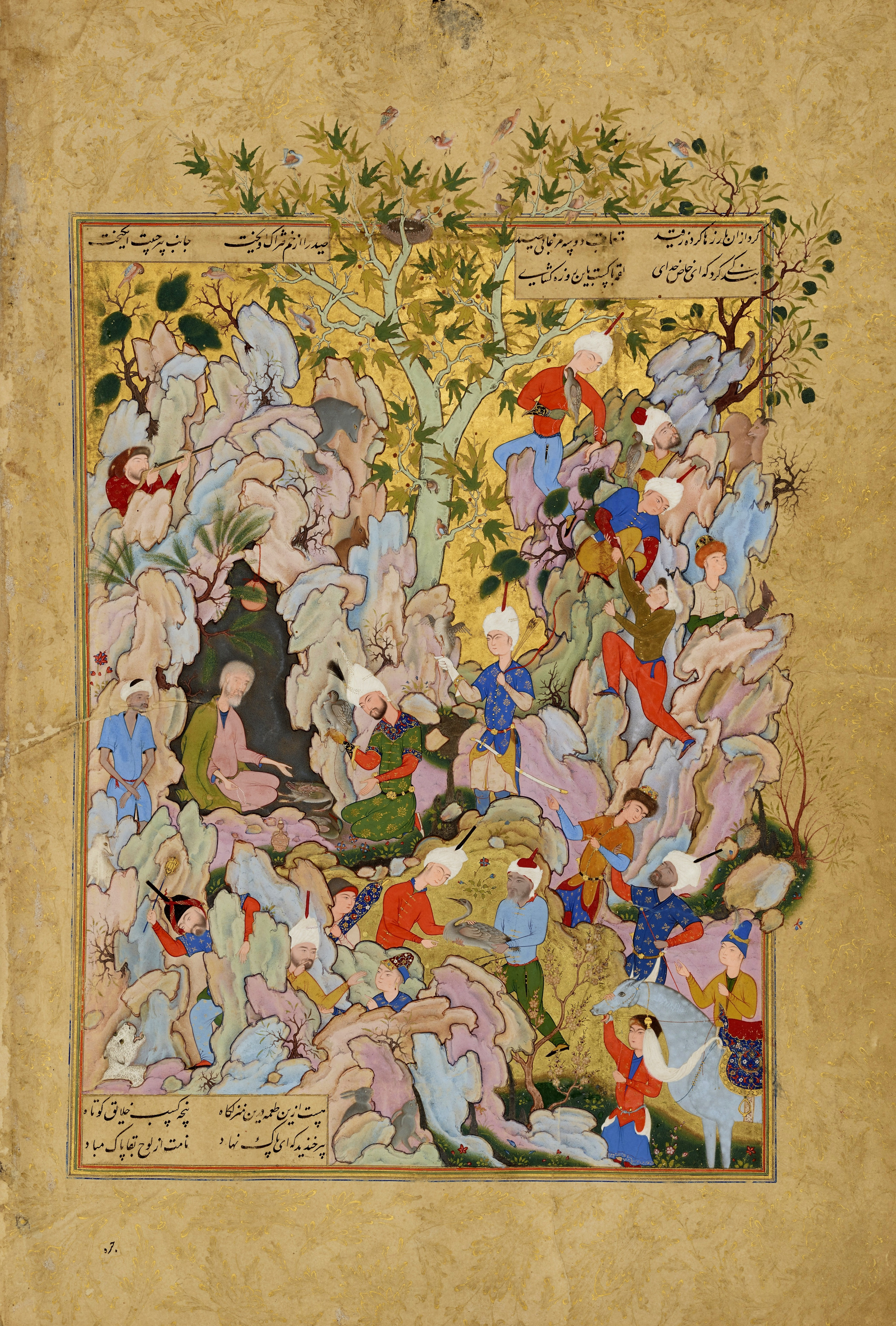
Persian miniature from the Haft Awrang in the Freer Gallery of Art, 1556–65, commissioned by Ibrahim Mirza and made in Mashhad.

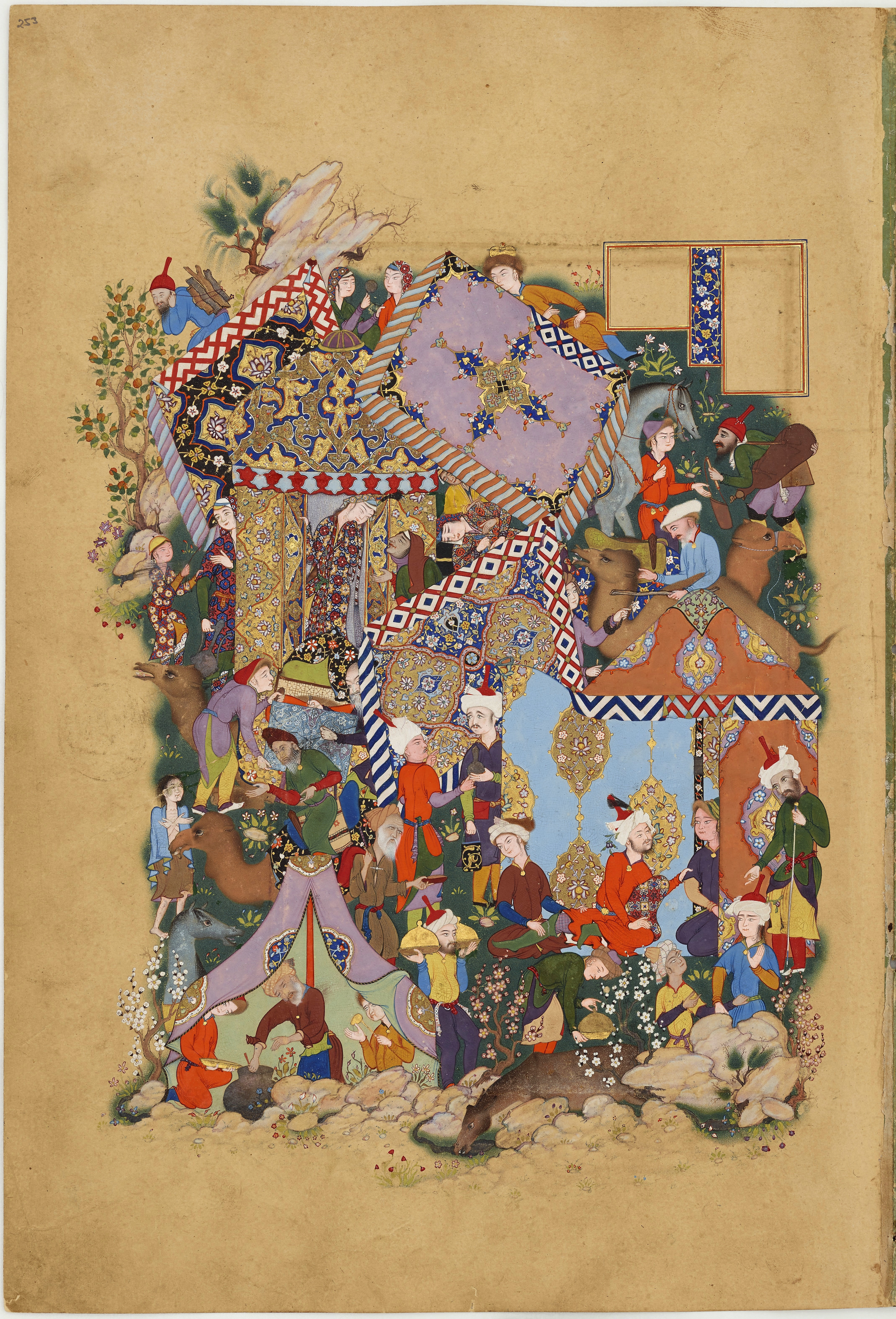
Majnun in Layla's camp from the Freer Jami, attributed to Shaykh Muhammad

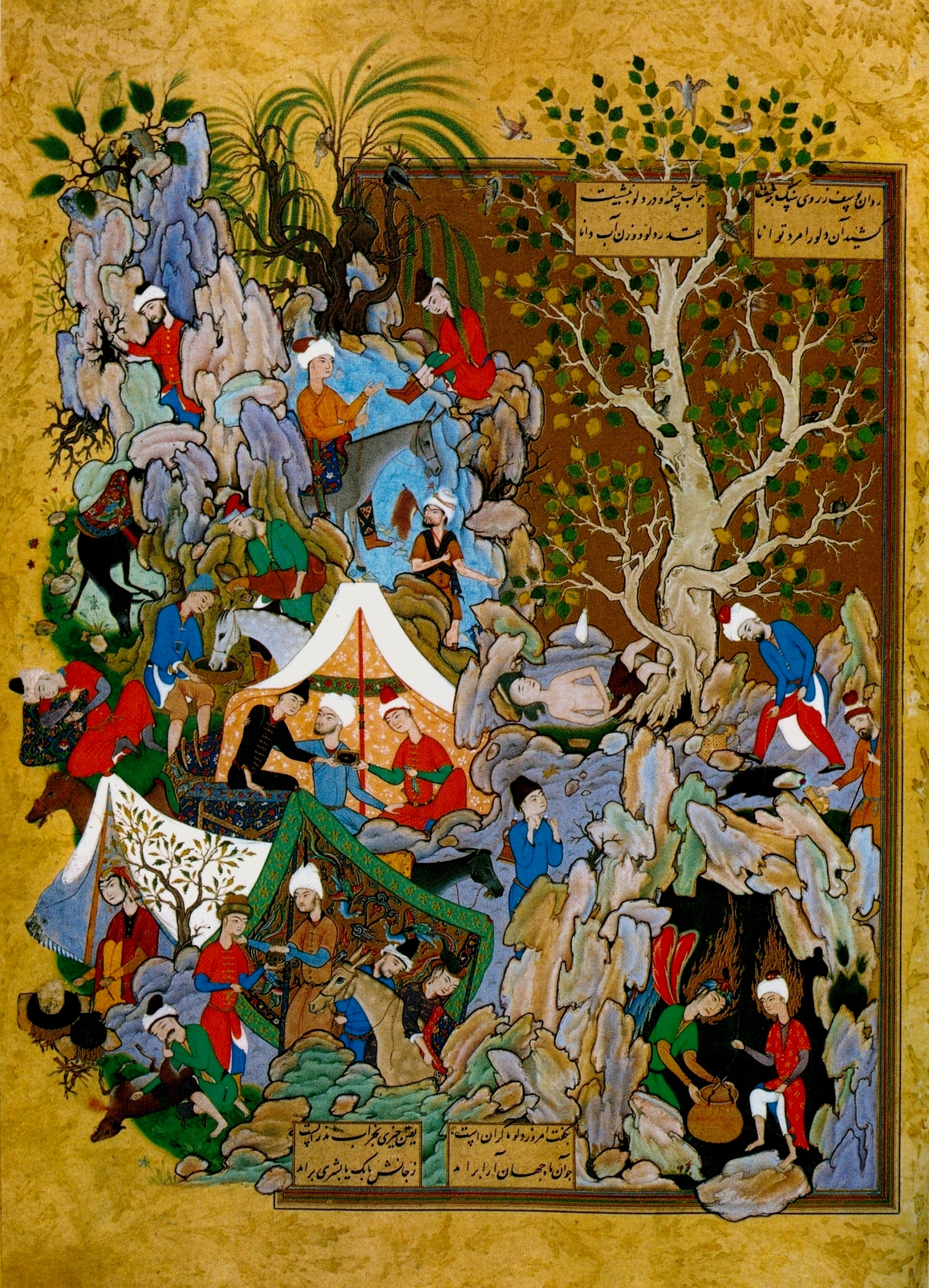
Freer Jami, attributed to Muzaffar Ali

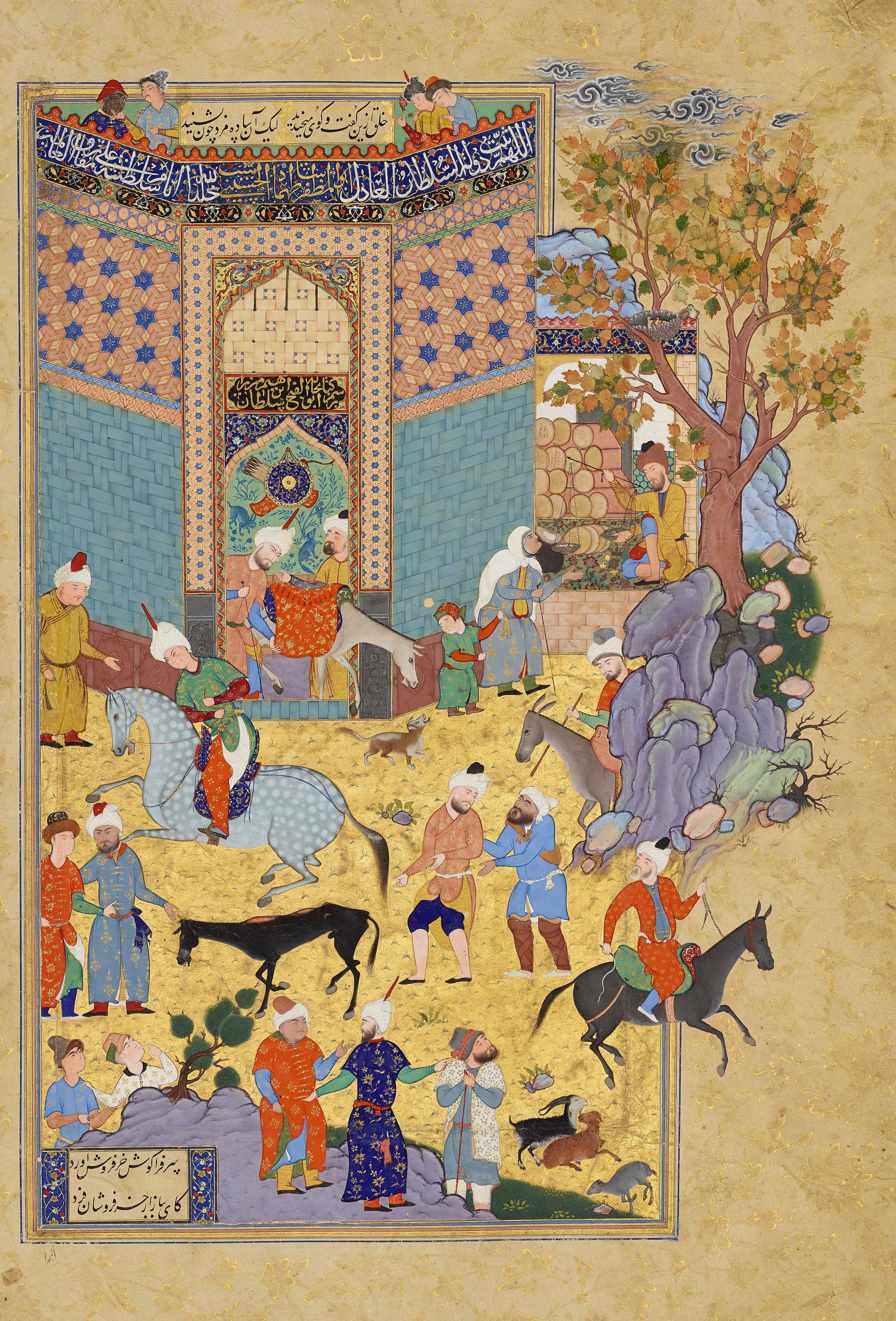
Freer Jami, attributed to Mirza Ali

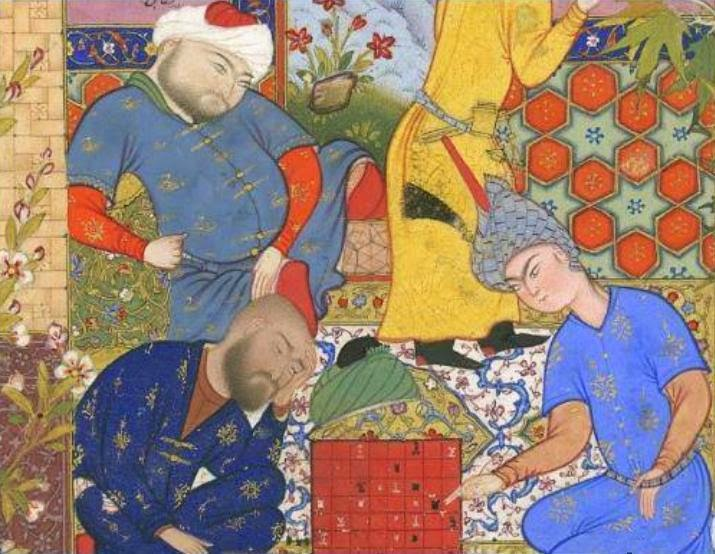
Detail from the Freer Jami
