= Mughal painting =

Mughal manuscript miniatures from South Asia

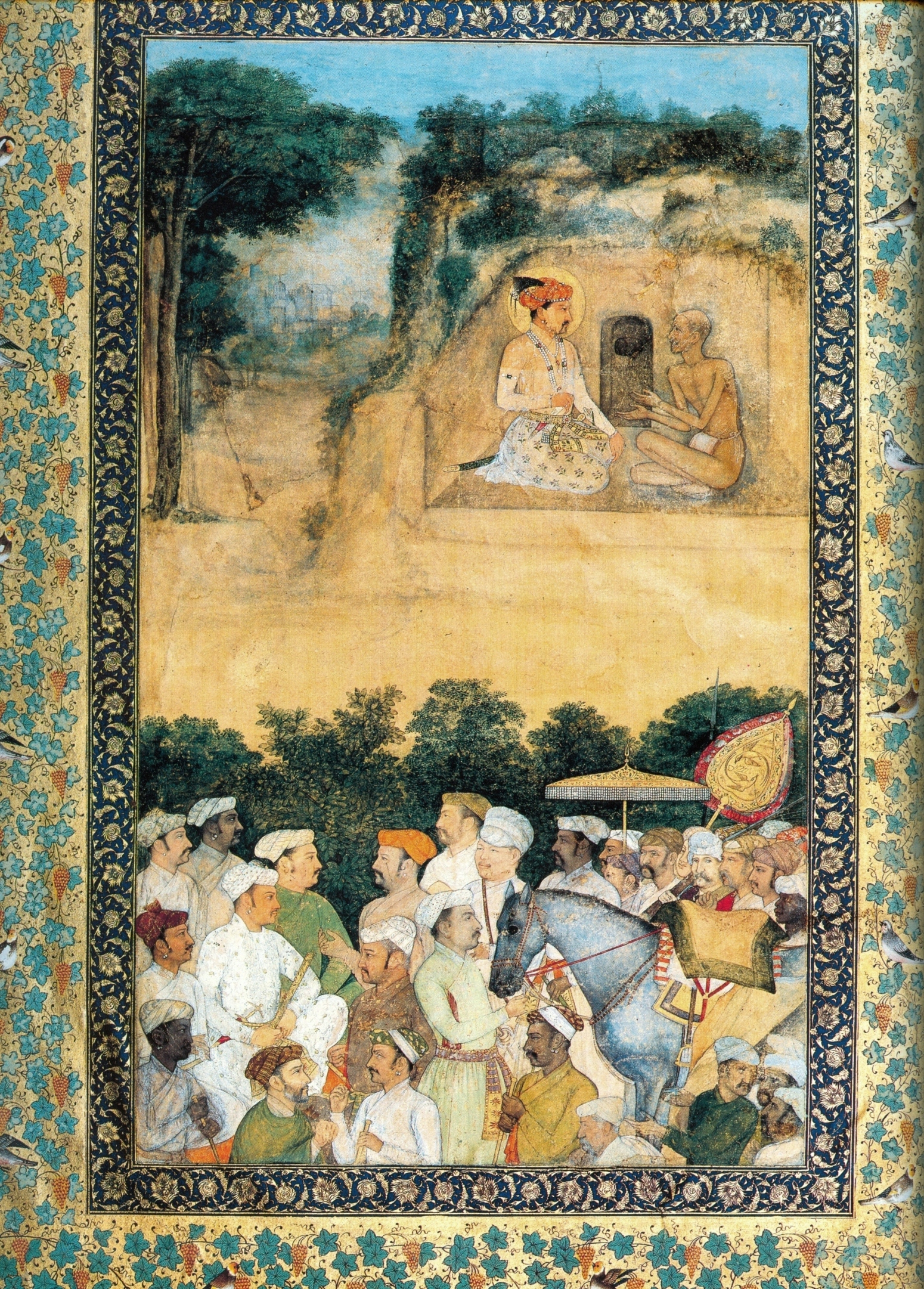
Govardhan, Emperor Jahangir visiting the ascetic Jadrup, c. 1616–1620

Mughal painting is a style of miniature painting, used as either book illustrations or as single works to be kept in albums (muraqqa), which originated during the Mughal period in the Indian subcontinent. It originated from Persian miniature which itself was influenced heavily by Chinese and European art, Mughal paintings also feature Indian and Islamic influences in its development. As the name suggests, these paintings developed during the rule of Mughal emperors in India, between the 16th to 19th century.

The Mughal emperors were Muslims and they are credited with consolidating Islam in the subcontinent, and spreading Islamic (and particularly Persian) art and culture as well as the faith.

Mughal painting immediately took a much greater interest in realistic portraiture than was typical of Persian miniatures. Animals and plants were the main subject of many miniatures for albums, and were more realistically depicted. Although many classic works of Persian literature continued to be illustrated, as well as Indian literature, the taste of the Mughal emperors for writing memoirs or diaries, begun by Babur, provided some of the most lavishly decorated texts, such as the Padshahnama genre of official histories. Subjects are rich in variety and include portraits, events and scenes from court life, wild life and hunting scenes, and illustrations of battles. The Persian tradition of richly decorated borders framing the central image (mostly trimmed in the images shown here) was continued, as was a modified form of the Persian convention of an elevated viewpoint.

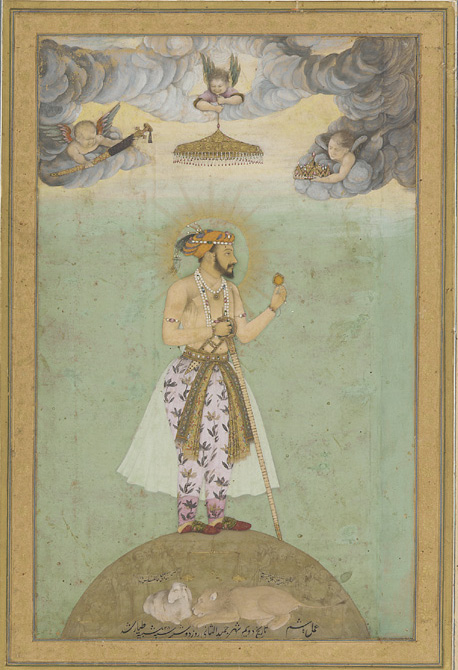
The Emperor Shah Jahan standing on a globe, with a halo and European-style putti, c. 1618–19 to 1629

The Mughal painting style later spread to other Indian courts, both Muslim and Hindu, and later Sikh, and was often used to depict Hindu subjects. This was mostly in northern India. It developed many regional styles in these courts, tending to become bolder but less refined. These are often described as "post-Mughal", "sub-Mughal" or "provincial Mughal".

== Subjects ==
=== Portraits ===
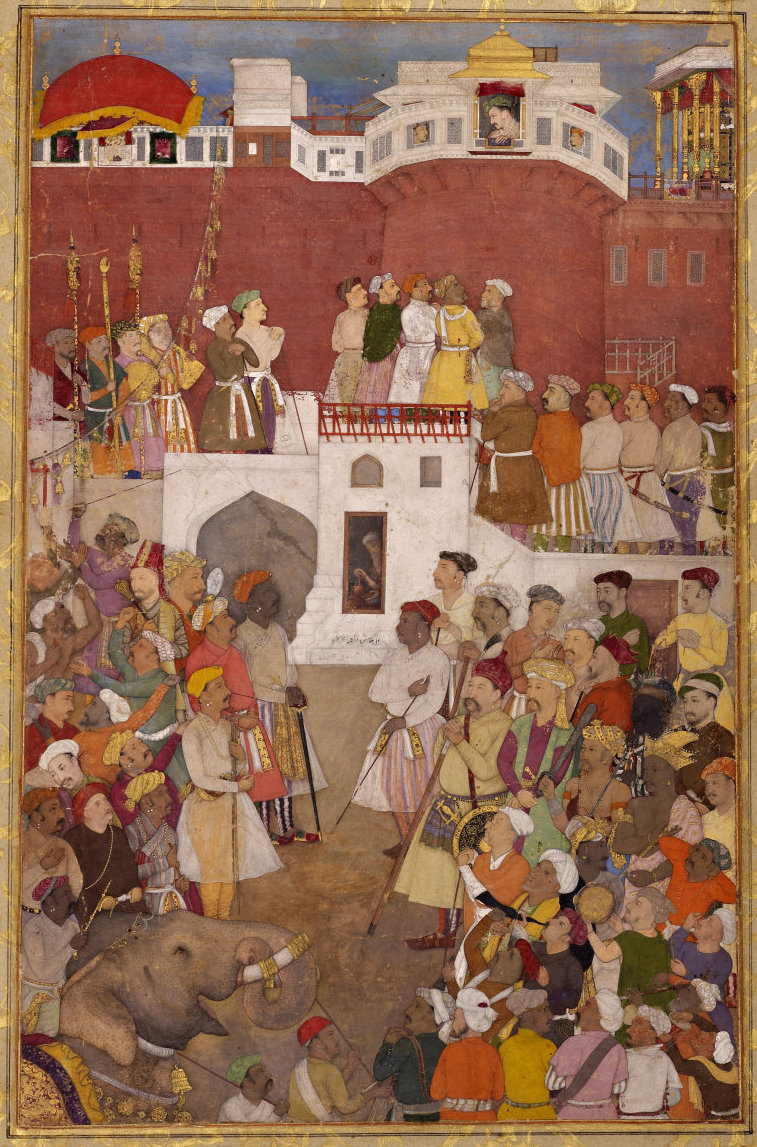
Abul Hasan, Emperor Jahangir at the Jharoka window of the Agra Fort, c. 1620, Aga Khan Museum

From fairly early the Mughal style made a strong feature of realistic portraiture, normally in profile, and influenced by Western prints, which were available at the Mughal court. This had never been a feature of either Persian miniature or earlier Indian painting. The pose, rarely varied in portraits, was to have the head in strict profile, but the rest of the body half turned towards the viewer. For a long time portraits were always of men, often accompanied by generalized female servants or concubines; but there is scholarly debate about the representation of female court members in portraiture. Some scholars claim there are no known extant likenesses of figures like Jahanara Begum and Mumtaz Mahal, and others attribute miniatures, for example from the Dara Shikoh album or the Freer Gallery of Art mirror portrait, to these famous noblewomen. The single idealized figure of the Riza Abbasi type was less popular, but fully painted scenes of lovers in a palace setting became popular later. Drawings of genre scenes, especially showing holy men, whether Muslim or Hindu, were also popular.

Akbar had an album, now dispersed, consisting entirely of portraits of figures at his enormous court which had a practical purpose; according to chroniclers he used to consult it when discussing appointments and the like with his advisors, apparently to jog his memory of who the people being discussed were. Many of them, like medieval European images of saints, carried objects associated with them to help identification, but otherwise the figures stand on a plain background. There are a number of fine portraits of Akbar, but it was under his successors Jahangir and Shah Jahan that the portrait of the ruler became firmly established as a leading subject in Indian miniature painting, which was to spread to both Muslim and Hindu princely courts across India.

From the 17th century equestrian portraits, mostly of rulers, became another popular borrowing from the West. Another new type of image showed the Jharokha Darshan (literally "balcony view/worship"), or public display of the emperor to the court, or the public, which became a daily ceremonial under Akbar, Jahangir and Shah Jahan, before being stopped as un-Islamic by Aurangzeb. In these scenes, the emperor is shown at top on a balcony or at a window, with a crowd of courtiers below, sometimes including many portraits. Like the increasingly large halos these emperors were given in single portraits, the iconography reflects the aspiration of the later Mughals to project an image as the representative of Allah on earth, or even as having a quasi-divine status themselves. Other images show the enthroned emperor having meetings, receiving visitors, or in durbar, or formal council. These and royal portraits incorporated in hunting scenes became highly popular types in later Rajput painting and other post-Mughal styles.

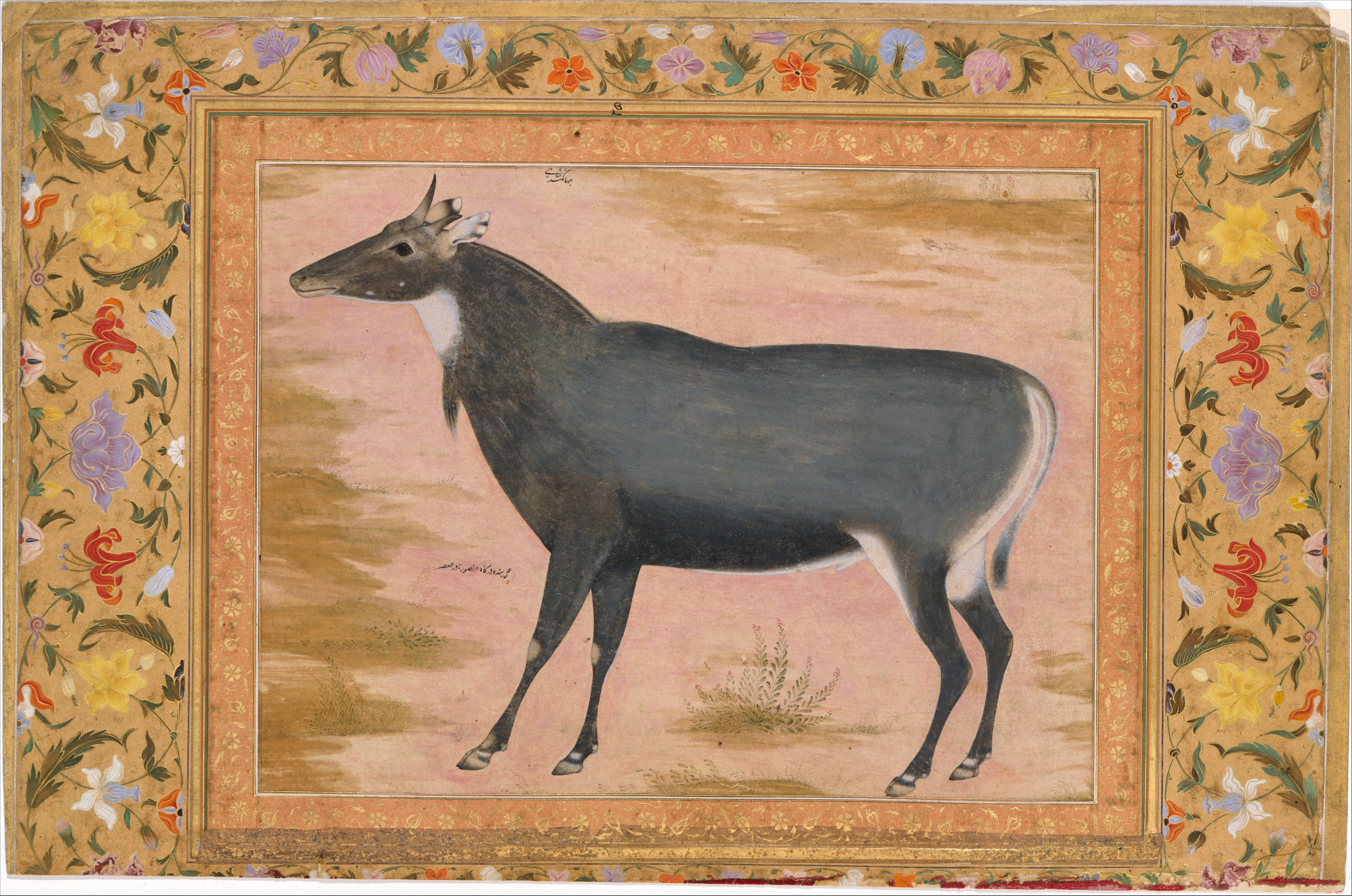
Nilgai by Ustad Mansur (fl. 1590–1624), who specialized in birds and animal studies for albums

Another popular subject area was realistic studies of animals and plants, mostly flowers; the text of the Baburnama includes a number of descriptions of such subjects, which were illustrated in the copies made for Akbar. These subjects also had specialist artists, including Ustad Mansur. Milo C. Beach argues that "Mughal naturalism has been greatly overstressed. Early animal imagery consists of variations on a theme, rather than new, innovative observations". He sees considerable borrowings from Chinese animal paintings on paper, which seem not to have been highly valued by Chinese collectors, and so reached India.

=== Illustrated books ===
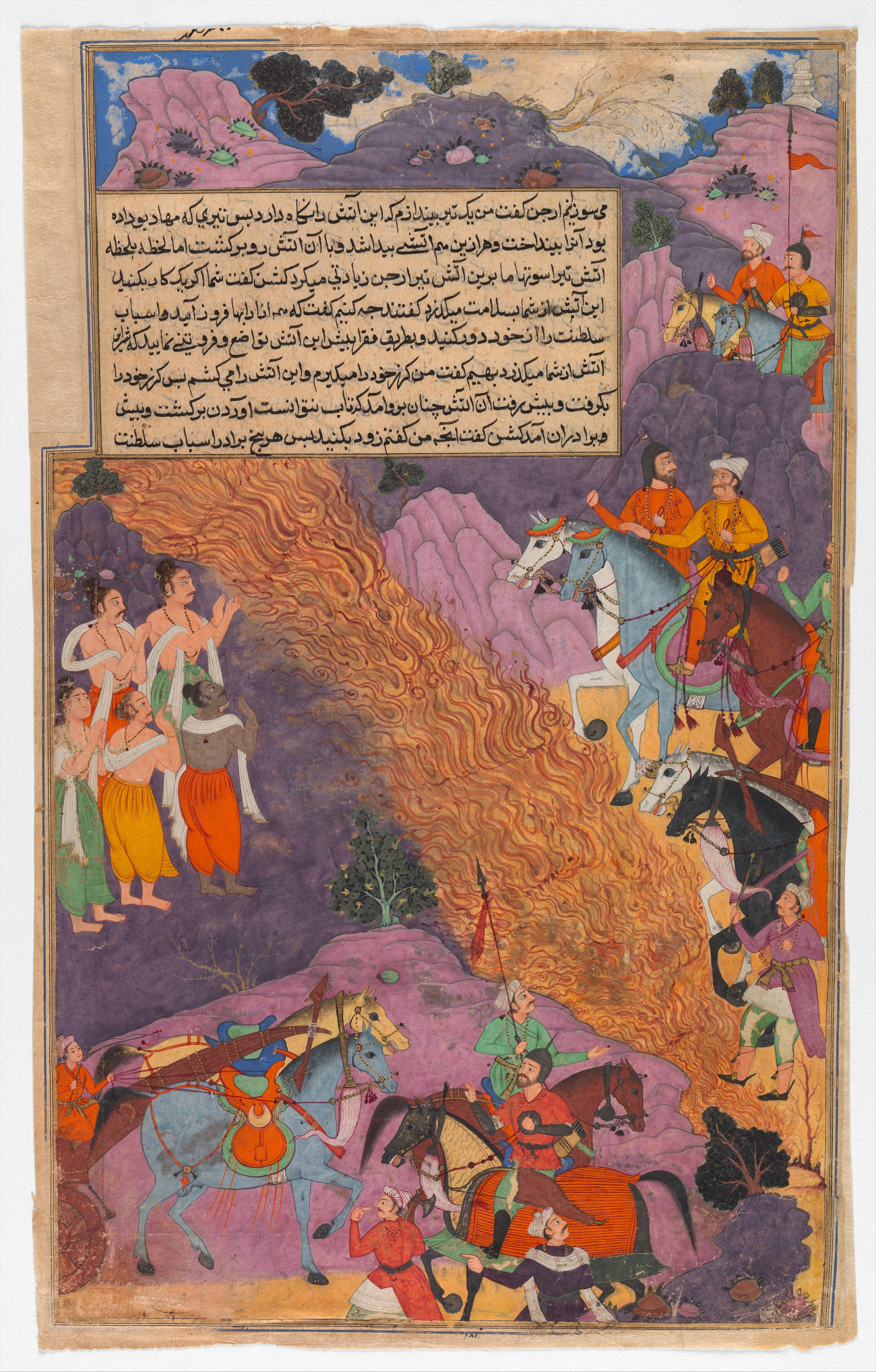
'Asvatthama Fires the Narayana Weapon (Cosmic Fire) at the Pandavas', Folio from Khan-i Khanan's Razmnama, ca. 1616–17, The Metropolitan Museum of Art

In the formative period of the style, under Akbar, the imperial workshop produced a number of heavily illustrated copies of established books in Persian. One of the first, probably from the 1550s and now mostly in the Cleveland Museum of Art, was a Tutinama with some 250 rather simple and rather small miniatures, most with only a few figures. In contrast, Akbar's Hamzanama had unusually large pages, of densely woven cotton rather than the usual paper, and the images were very often crowded with figures. The work was "a continuous series of romantic interludes, threatening events, narrow escapes, and violent acts", supposedly telling the life of an uncle of Muhammad. Akbar's manuscript had a remarkable total of some 1400 miniatures, one on every opening, with the relevant text written on the back of the page, presumably to be read to the emperor as he looked at each image. This colossal project took most of the 1560s, and probably beyond. These and a few other early works saw a fairly unified Mughal workshop style emerge by around 1580.

Other large projects included biographies or memoirs of the Mughal dynasty. Babur, its founder, had written a memoir in Chaghtai Turkic, which his grandson, Akbar had translated into Persian, as the Baburnama (1589), and then produced in four lavishly illustrated copies, with up to 183 miniatures each. The Akbarnama was Akbar's own commissioned biography or chronicle, produced in many versions, and the tradition continued with Jahangir's autobiography, Tuzk-e-Jahangiri (or Jahangirnama) and a celebratory biography of Shah Jahan, called the Padshahnama, which brought the era of the large illustrated imperial biography to an end, around 1650. Akbar commissioned a copy of the Zafarnama, a biography of his distant ancestor Timur, but though he had his aunt Gulbadan Begum write an account of his father Humayun titled 'Humayun Nama', no illustrated manuscript survives.

Volumes of the classics of Persian poetry usually had rather fewer miniatures, often around twenty, but often these were of the highest quality. Akbar also had the Hindu epic poems translated into Persian, and produced in illustrated versions. Four are known of the Razmnama, a Mahabharata in Persian, from between 1585 and c. 1617. Akbar had at least one copy of the Persian version of the Ramayana, alongside other works like the Bhagavata Purana, Harivamsa, and Panchatantra.

== Origins ==
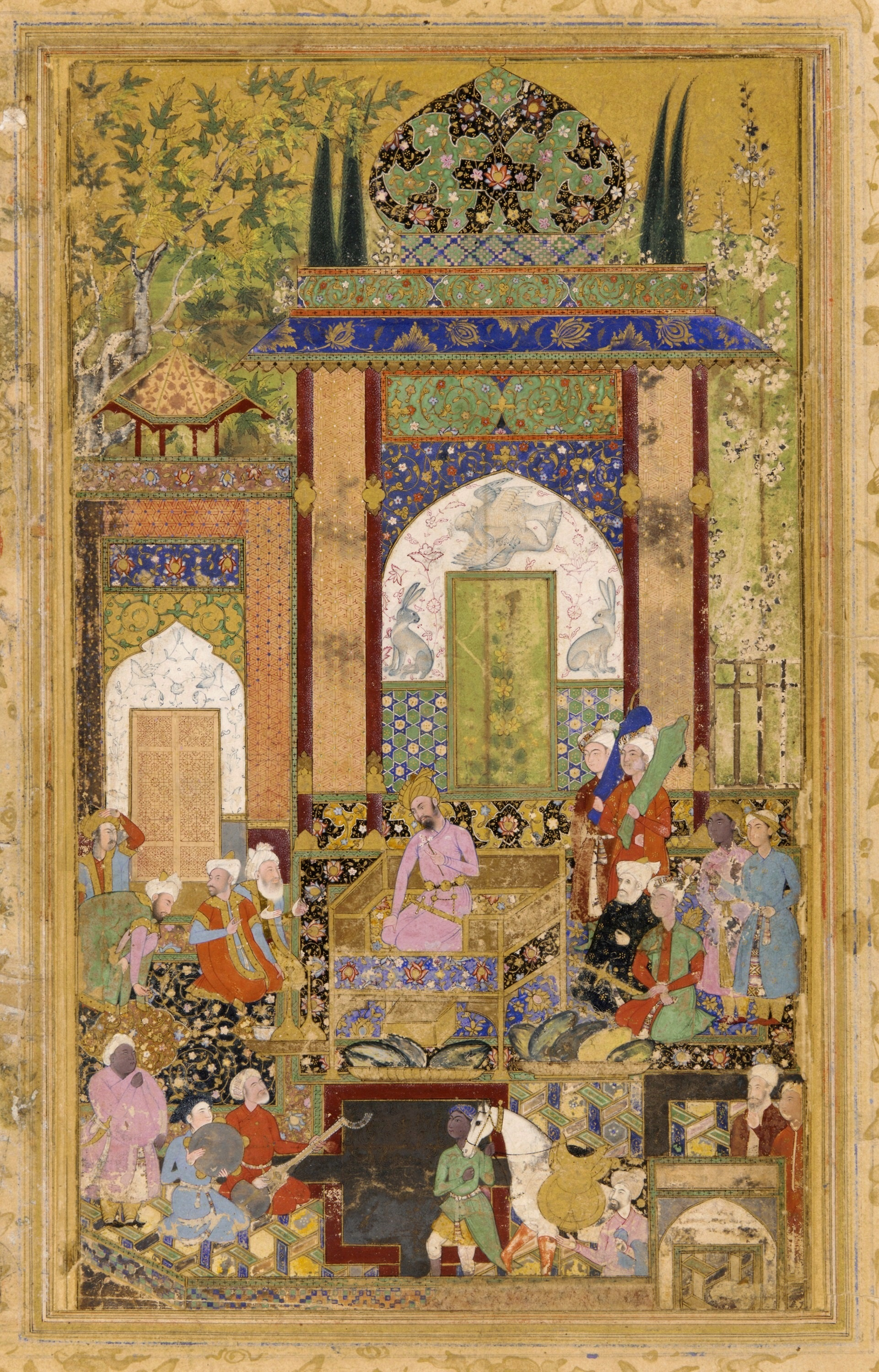
Babur Receives a Courtier by Farrukh Beg c. 1580–1585. Opaque watercolor and gold on paper, painted and mounted within borders, from a Rawżat aṣ-ṣafāʾ. Still using the style of Persian miniature.

Mughal court painting, as opposed to looser variants of the Mughal style produced in regional courts and cities, These were Hindu and Jain, and earlier Buddhist, and almost entirely religious. They existed mainly in relatively small illustrations to texts, but also mural paintings, and paintings in folk styles on cloth, in particular ones on scrolls made to be displayed by popular singers or reciters of the Hindu epics and other stories, performed by travelling specialists; very few early examples of these last survive. A vivid Kashmiri tradition of mural paintings flourished between the 9th and 17th centuries, as seen in the murals of Alchi Monastery or Tsaparang: a number of Kashimiri painters were employed by Akbar and some influence of their art can be seen in various Mughal works, such as the Hamzanama.

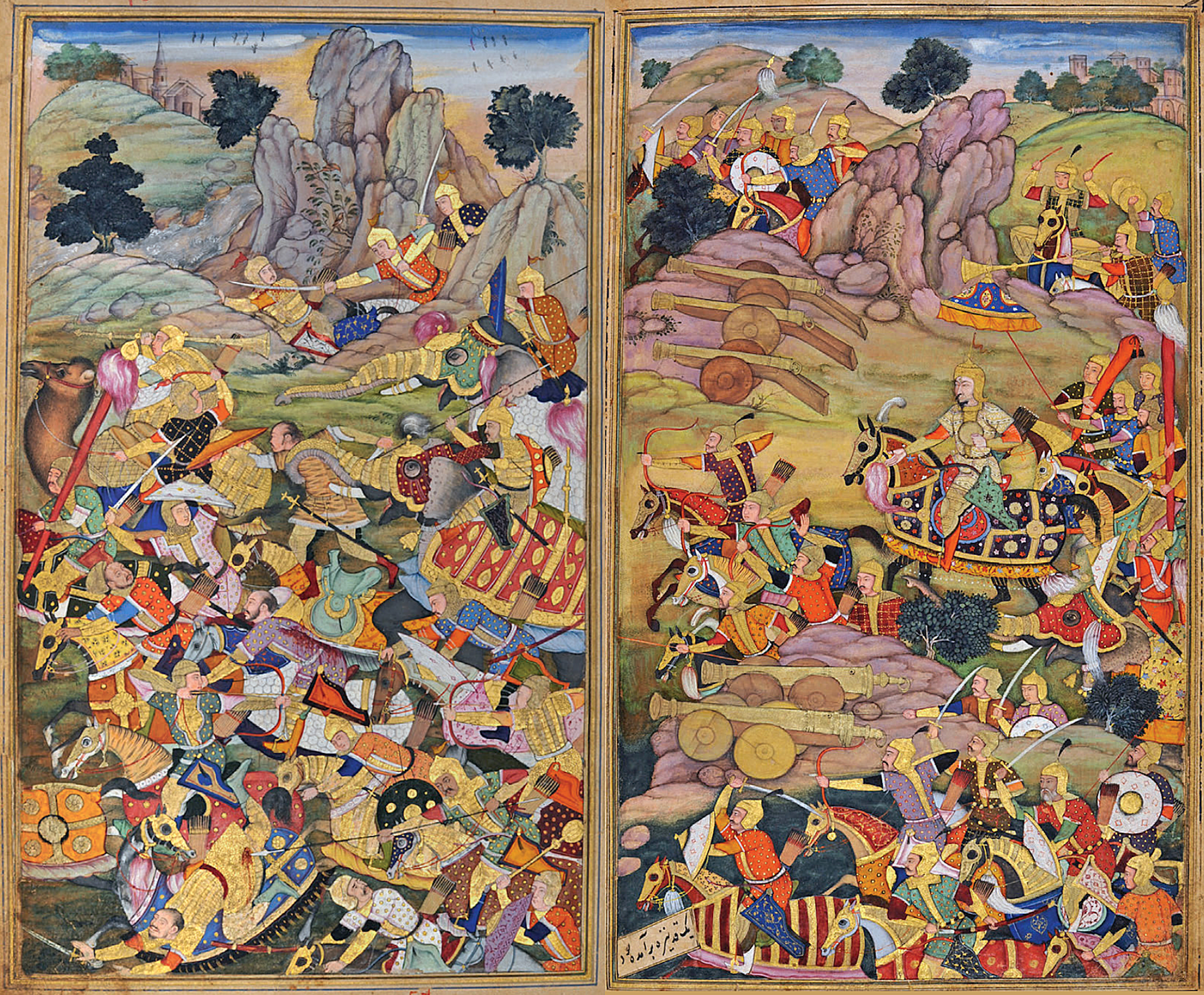
An illustration of the First Battle of Panipat from the Baburnama, circa 1598.

In contrast, Mughal painting was "almost entirely secular", although religious figures were sometimes portrayed. Realism, especially in portraits of both people and animals, became a key aim, far more than in Persian painting, let alone the Indian traditions. There was already a Muslim tradition of miniature painting under the Sultanate of Delhi which the Mughals overthrew, and like the Mughals, and the very earliest of Central Asian rulers into the subcontinent, patronized foreign culture. These paintings were painted on loose-leaf paper, and were usually placed between decorated wooden covers. Although the first surviving manuscripts are from Mandu in the years either side of 1500, there were very likely earlier ones which are either lost, or perhaps now attributed to southern Persia, as later manuscripts can be hard to distinguish from these by style alone, and some remain the subject of debate among specialists. By the time of the Mughal invasion, the tradition had abandoned the high viewpoint typical of the Persian style, and adopted a more realistic style for animals and plants.

No miniatures survive from the reign of the founder of the dynasty, Babur, nor does he mention commissioning any in his memoirs, the Baburnama. Copies of this were illustrated by his descendants, Akbar in particular, with many portraits of the new animals Babur encountered when he came to India, which are carefully described. However some surviving un-illustrated manuscripts may have been commissioned by him, and he comments on the style of some famous past Persian masters. Some older illustrated manuscripts have his seal on them; the Mughals came from a long line stretching back to Timur and were fully assimilated into Persianate culture, and expected to patronize literature and the arts.

The style of the Mughal school developed within the royal atelier. Knowledge was primarily transmitted through familial and apprenticeship relationships, and the system of joint manuscript production which brought multiple artists together for single works. In some cases, senior artists would draw the illustrations in outline, and more junior ones would usually apply the colors, especially for background areas. Where no artist names are inscribed, it is very difficult to trace Imperial Mughal paintings back to specific artists.

== Development ==
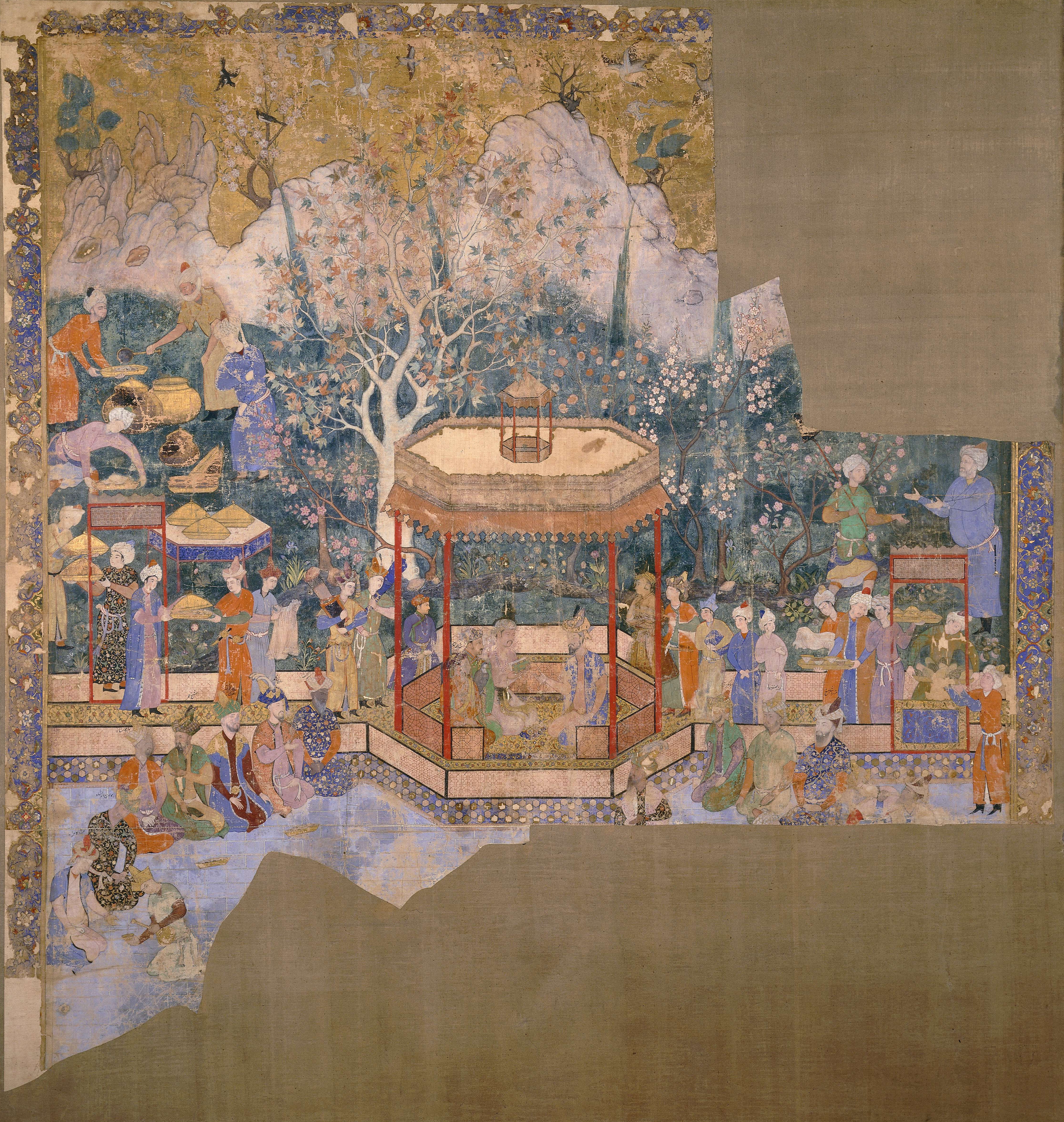
Princes of the House of Timur, attributed to the Persian Abd as-Samad, c.1550–1555, with additions in the next century under Jahangir

After a tentative start under Humayun, the great period of Mughal painting was during the next three reigns, of Akbar, Jahangir and Shah Jahan, which covered just over a century between them.

=== Humayun (1530–1540 and 1555–1556) ===
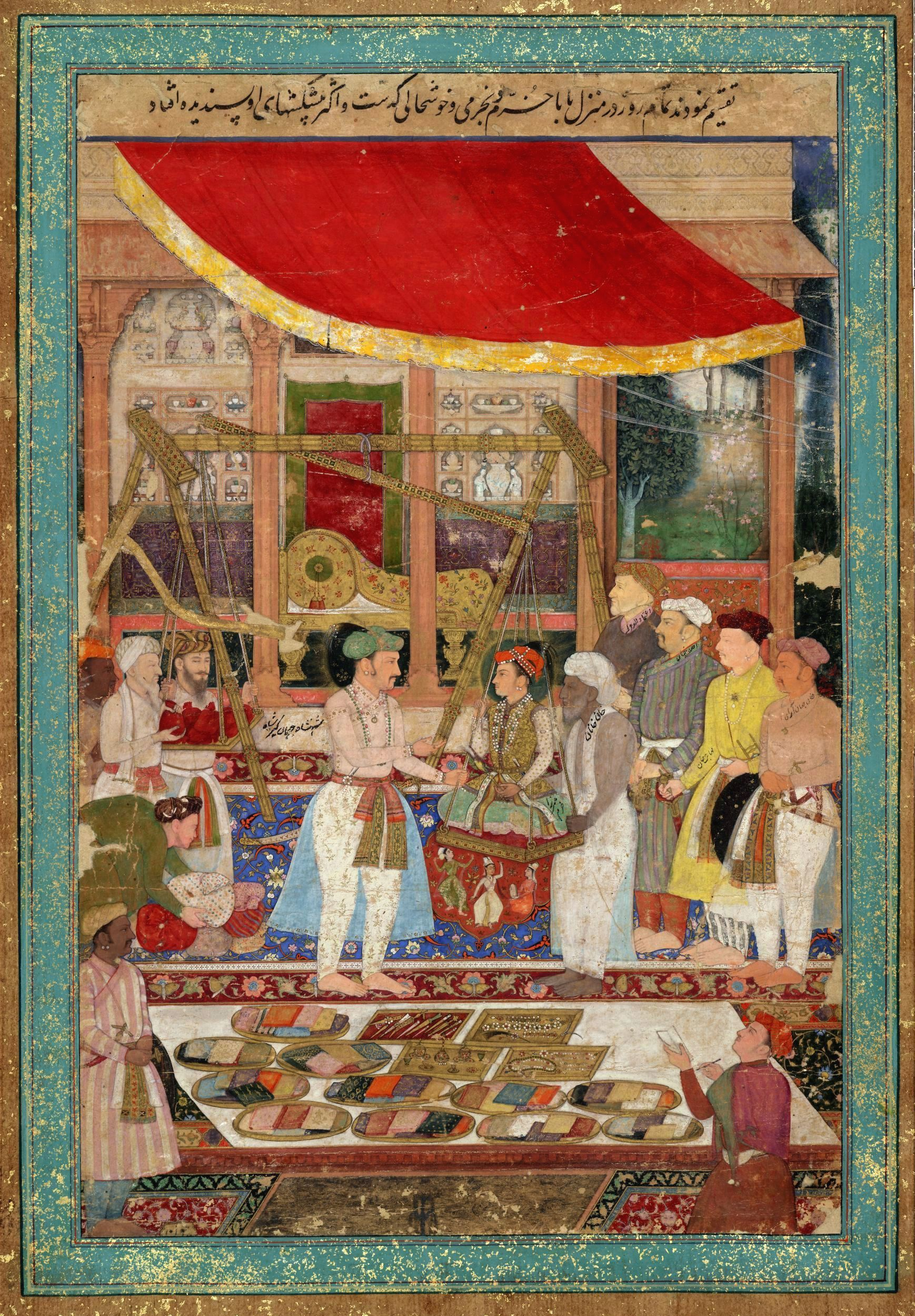
Emperor Jahangir weighs Prince Khurram by Manohar Das, 1610–1615, from Jahangir's own copy of the Tuzk-e-Jahangiri. The names of the main figures are noted on their clothes, and the artist shown at bottom. British Museum.

When the second Mughal emperor, Humayun was in exile in Tabriz in the Safavid court of Shah Tahmasp I of Persia, he was exposed to Persian miniature painting, and commissioned at least one work there (or in Kabul), an unusually large painting on cloth of Princes of the House of Timur, now in the British Museum. Originally a group portrait with his sons, in the next century Jahangir had it added to make it a dynastic group including dead ancestors. When Humayun returned to India, he brought two accomplished Persian artists, Abd al-Samad and Mir Sayyid Ali with him. His usurping brother Kamran Mirza had maintained a workshop in Kabul, which Humayun perhaps took over into his own. Humayun's major known commission was a Khamsa of Nizami with 36 illuminated pages (BNF, Smith-Lesouëf 216), in which the different styles of the various artists are mostly still apparent. Apart from the London painting, he also commissioned at least two miniatures showing himself with family members, a type of subject that was rare in Persia but common among the Mughals.

=== Akbar (1556–1605) ===
During the reign of Humayun's son Akbar (r.1556–1605), the imperial court, apart from being the centre of administrative authority to manage and rule the vast Mughal empire, also emerged as a centre of cultural excellence. Akbar inherited and expanded his father's library and atelier of court painters, and paid close personal attention to its output. He had studied painting in his youth under Abd as-Samad, though it is not clear how far these studies went.

Between 1560 and 1566, the Tutinama ("Tales of a Parrot"), now in the Cleveland Museum of Art, was illustrated, showing "the stylistic components of the imperial Mughal style at a formative stage". Among other manuscripts, between 1562 and 1577, the atelier worked on an illustrated manuscript of the Hamzanama consisting of 1,400 cotton folios, unusually large at 69 cm x 54 cm (approx. 27 x 20 inches) in size. This huge project, "served as a means of moulding the disparate styles of his artists, from Iran and from different parts of India, into one unified style". By the end, the style reached maturity, and "the flat and decorative compositions of Persian painting have been transformed by creating a believable space in which characters painted in the round can perform".

Saʿdī Shīrāzī's masterpiece Gulistān was produced at Fatehpur Sikri in 1582, Abu Tahir Tarsusi's Darab-Nama around 1585; the Khamsa of Nizami (British Library, Or. 12208) followed in the 1590s and Jāmī's Bahâristân around 1595 in Lahore. As Mughal-derived painting spread to Hindu courts the texts illustrated included the Hindu epics including the Ramayana and the Mahabharata; themes with animal fables; individual portraits; and paintings on scores of different themes. Mughal style during this period continued to refine itself with elements of realism and naturalism coming to the fore. Between 1570 and 1585, Akbar hired over one hundred painters to practice Mughal style painting.

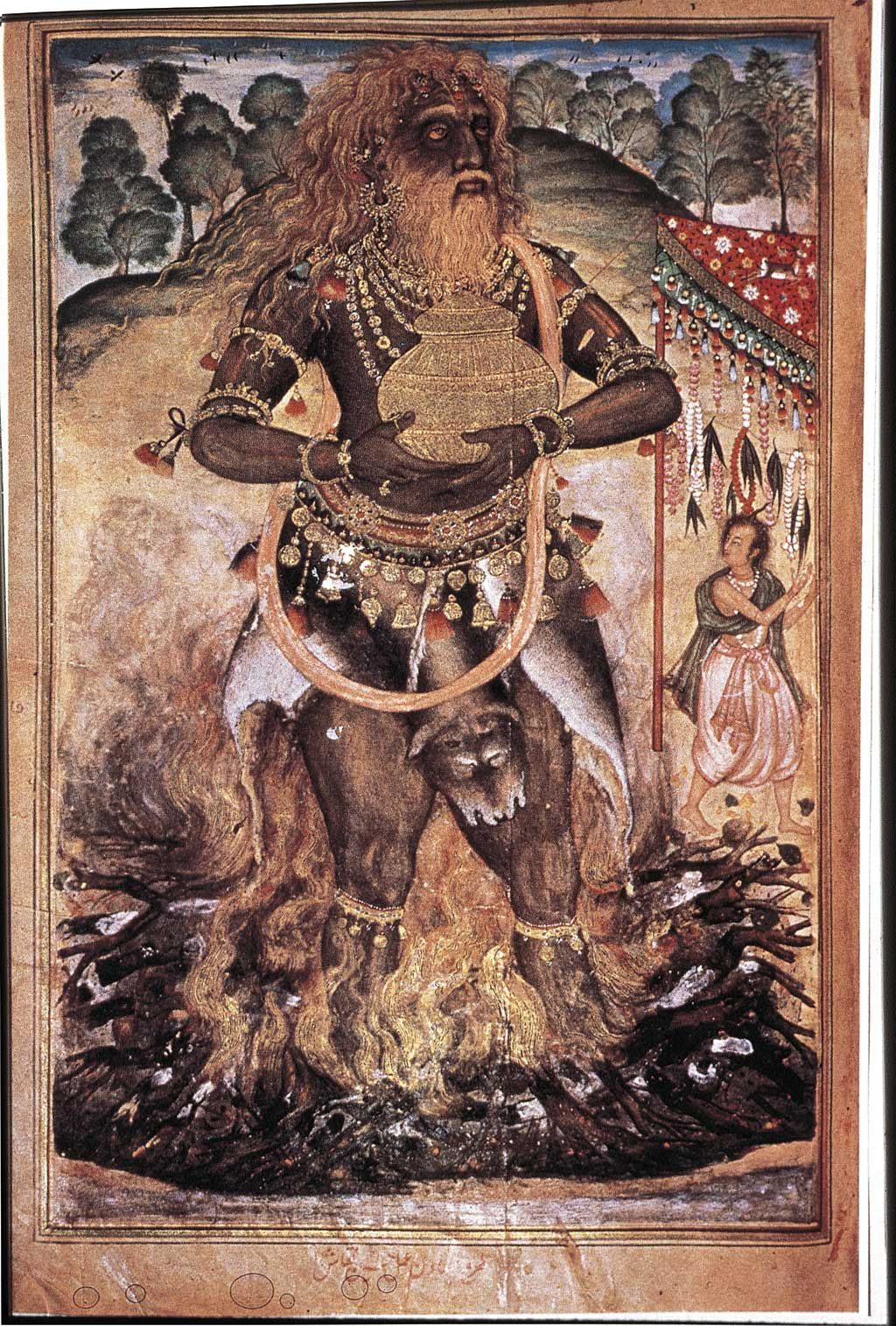
Agnipuruṣa rises from the sacred fire of the Putrakameshti, circa 1588–1592, by Basawan and Husain Naqqash. Gouache and gold on paper, Maharaja Sawai Man Singh II Museum Trust, The City Palace, Jaipur.

Akbar's rule established a celebratory theme among the Mughal Empire. In this new period, Akbar persuaded artist to focus on showing off spectacles and including grand symbols like elephants in their work to create the sense of a prospering empire. Along with this new mindset, Akbar also encouraged his people to write down and find a way to record what they remembered from earlier times to ensure that others would be able to remember the greatness of the Mughal empire.

=== Jahangir (1605–1627) ===
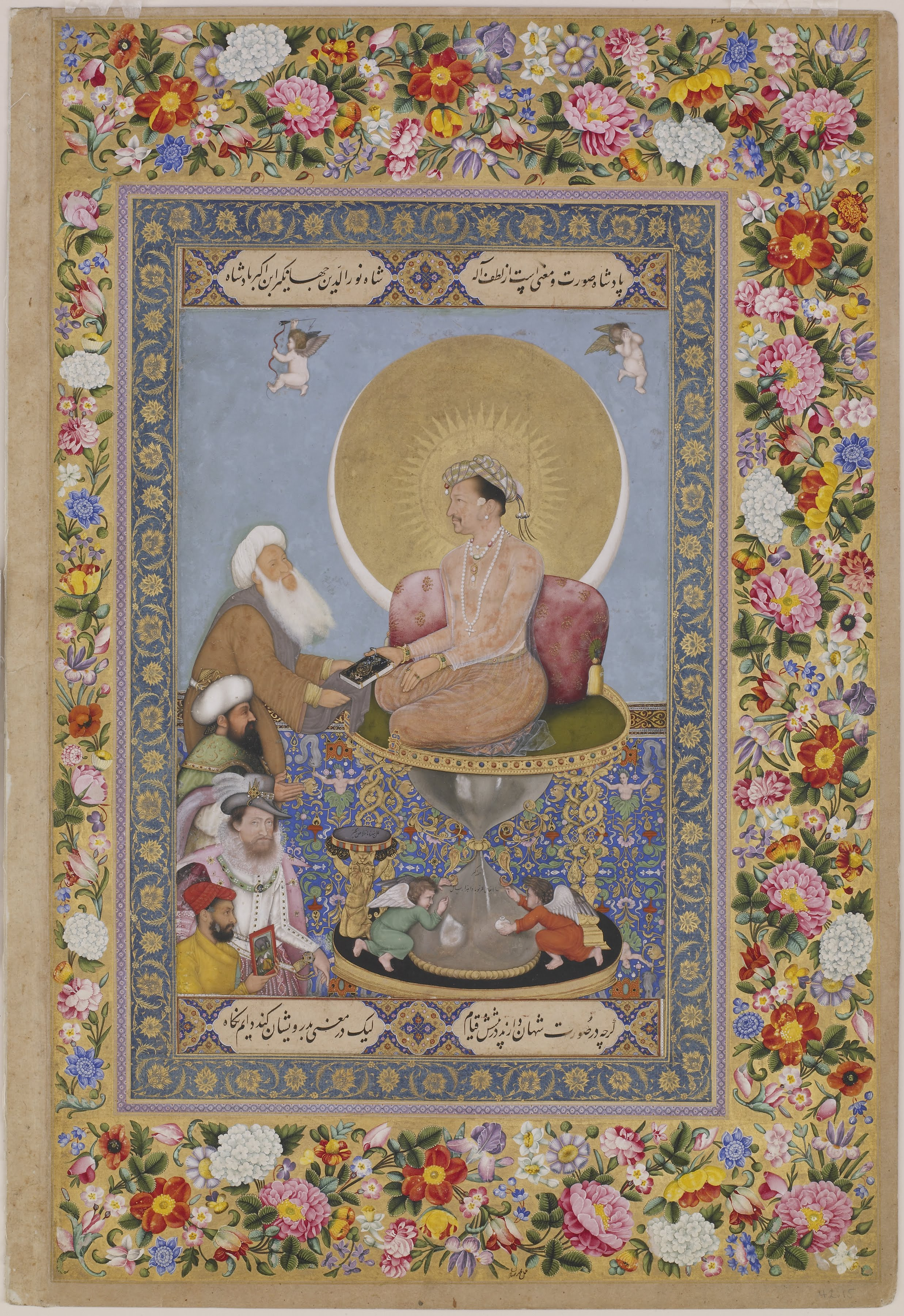
'Jahangir Preferring a Sufi Shaikh to Kings', c. 1615–1618, Bichitr, Freer Gallery of Art.

Jahangir had an artistic inclination and during his reign Mughal painting developed further. Like Akbar, Jahangir collected illuminated Persian manuscripts and albums, alongside European paintings. Brushwork became finer and the colours lighter. Jahangir was also deeply influenced by European painting. During his reign he came into direct contact with the English Crown and was sent gifts of oil paintings, which included portraits of the King and Queen. He encouraged his royal atelier to take up the single point perspective favored by European artists, unlike the flattened multi-layered style used in traditional miniatures. He particularly encouraged paintings depicting events of his own life, individual portraits, and studies of birds, flowers and animals. The Tuzk-e-Jahangiri (or Jahangirnama), written during his lifetime, which is an autobiographical account of Jahangir's reign, has several paintings, including some unusual subjects such as the union of a saint with a tigress, and fights between spiders. Mughal paintings made during Jahangir's reign continued the trend of naturalism and were influenced by the resurgence of Persian styles and subjects over more traditional Hindu.

=== Shah Jahan (1628–1658) ===
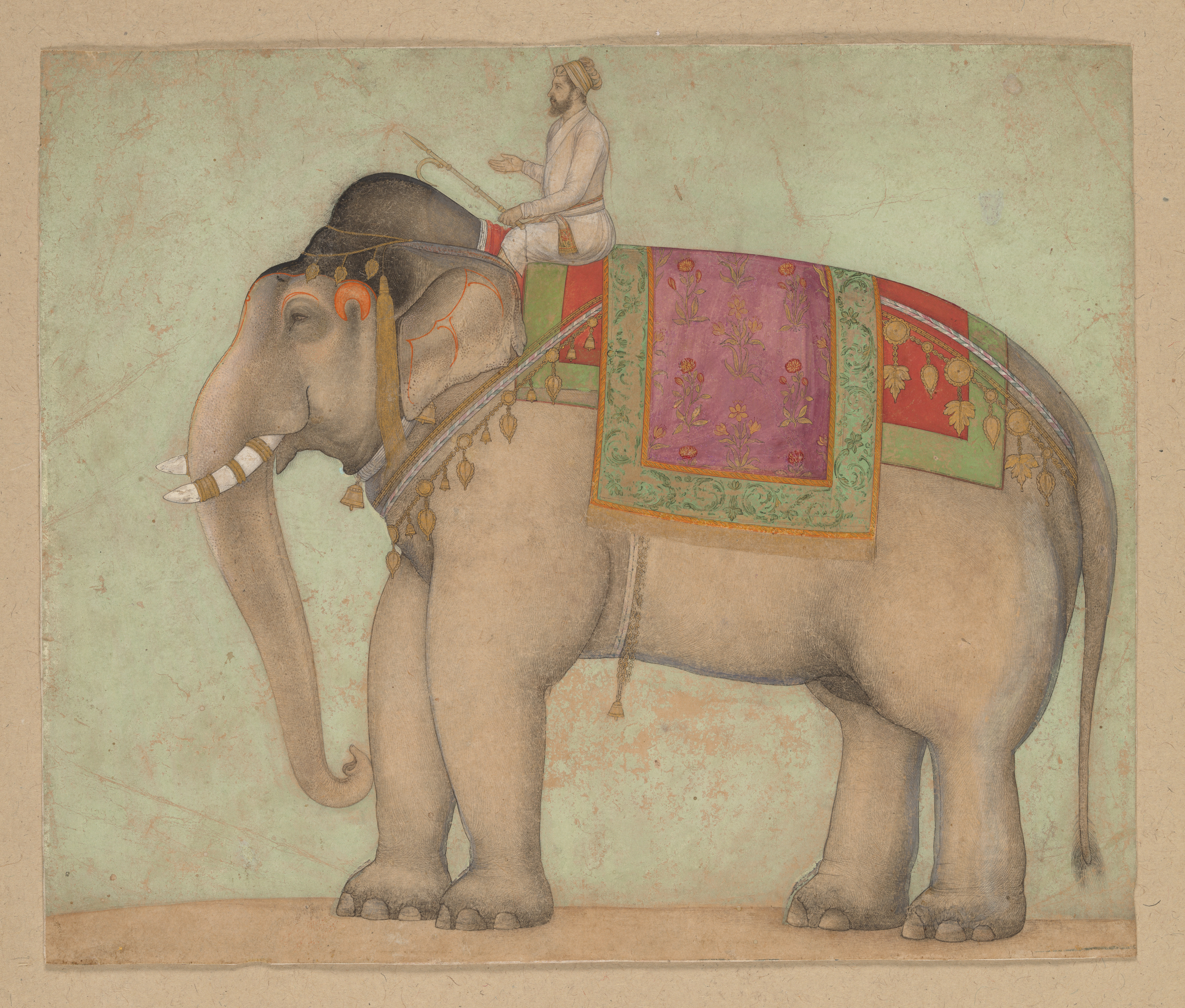
'Elephant with Mahout', circa 1660, The Metropolitan Museum of Art.

During the reign of Shah Jahan (1628–58), Mughal paintings continued to develop, but court paintings became more rigid and formal. The illustrations from the Pādshāhnāma ('The Book of the Emperor'), one of the finest Islamic manuscripts from the Royal Collection, at Windsor, were painted during the reign of Shah Jahan. Written in Persian on paper that is flecked with gold, has exquisitely rendered paintings. The Pādshāhnāma has portraits of the courtiers and servants of the King painted with great detail and individuality. In keeping with the strict formality at court, however the portraits of the King and important nobles was rendered in strict profile, whereas servants and common people, depicted with individual features have been portrayed in the three-quarter view or the frontal view.

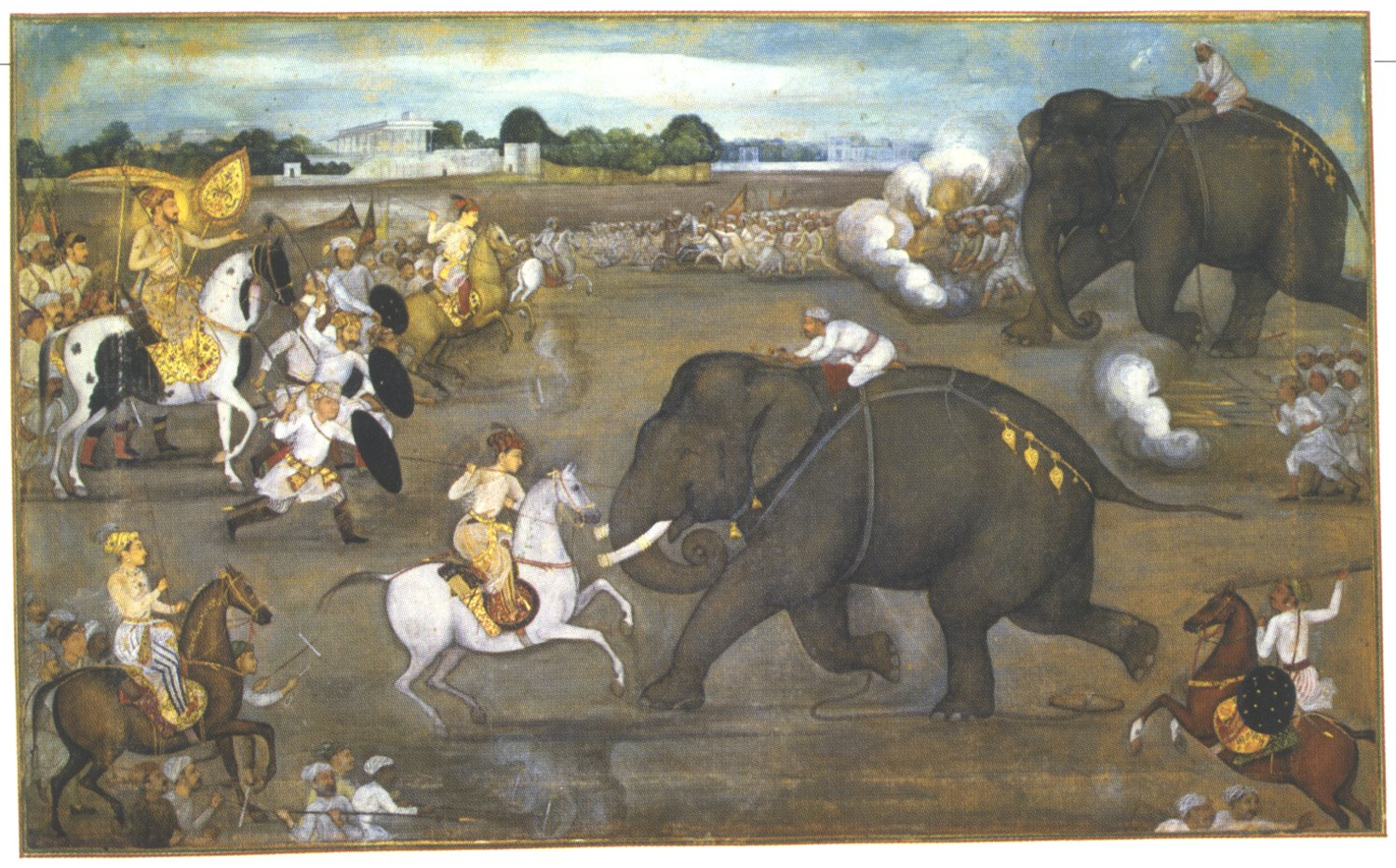
'Prince Awrangzeb (Aurangzeb) facing a maddened elephant named Sudhakar (7 June 1633)', c. 1635–40, the Royal Collection Trust. The only landscape-format painting in the Padshahnama manuscript, this image symbolises the strength and vigour of the Mughal dynasty as Shah Jahan observes his son Aurangzeb thrust a spear into the trunk of a charging elephant.

Themes including musical parties; lovers, sometimes in intimate positions, on terraces and gardens; and ascetics gathered around a fire, abound in the Mughal paintings of this period. Even though this period was titled the most prosperous, artists during this time were expected to adhere to representing life in court as organized and unified. For this reason, most art created under his rule focused mainly on the emperor and aided in establishing his authority. The purpose of this art was to leave behind an image of what the Mughal's believed to be the ideal ruler and state.

== Later paintings ==
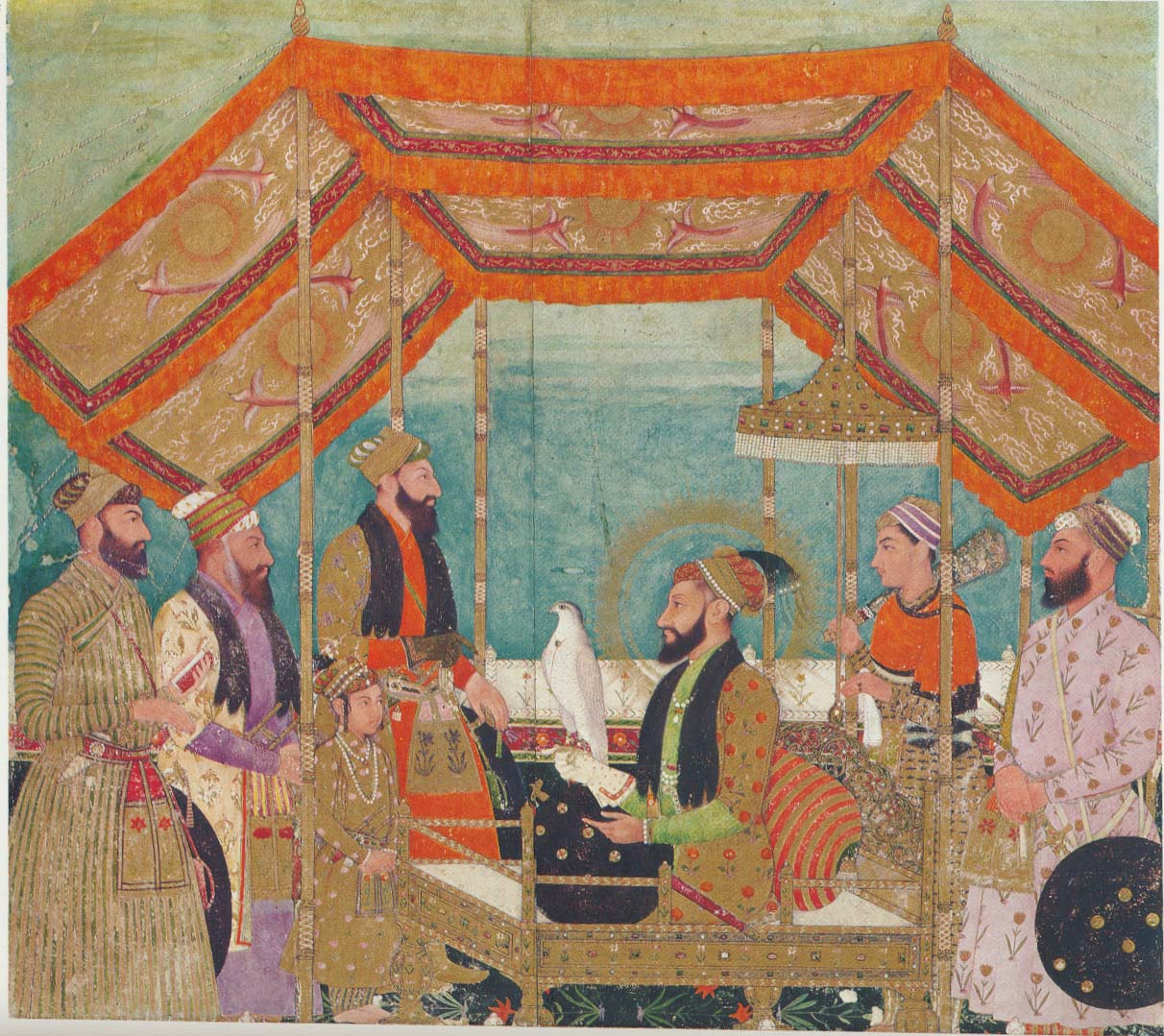
A durbar scene with the newly crowned Emperor Aurangzeb in his golden throne. Though he did not encourage Mughal painting, some of the best work was done during his reign.

Aurangzeb (1658–1707) was never an enthusiastic patron of painting, largely for religious reasons, and took a turn away from the pomp and ceremonial of the court around 1668, after which he probably commissioned no more paintings. After 1681 he moved to the Deccan to pursue his slow conquest of the Deccan Sultanates, never returning to live in the north.

'Lovers and beloveds, A composite of scenes from Persian, Urdu, and Sanskrit literature', painting by Chitarman II or Kalyan Das, c. 1735, Cleveland Museum of Art. By reading the Persian inscriptions in Nasta‘liq script, following figures from diverse literature can be identified: Ranjha, Joseph and Zulaykha, Vamiq and ‘Azra, Nala, Sassi and Punnun, Shirin and Farhad, Padmavati and Ratnasena, Majnun and also, Hafiz of Shiraz and the woman with whom, according to popular lore, Hafiz was supposed to have fallen in love as a youth.

Mughal paintings continued to survive, but the decline had set in. Some sources however note that a few of the best Mughal paintings were made for Aurangzeb, speculating that they believed that he was about to close the workshops and thus exceeded themselves in his behalf. There was a brief revival during the reign of Muhammad Shah (1719–1748), but by the time of Shah Alam II (1759–1806), the art of Mughal painting had lost its glory. By that time, other schools of Indian painting had developed, including, in the royal courts of the Rajput kingdoms of Rajputana, Rajput painting and in cities ruled by the British East India Company, the Company style under Western influence. Late Mughal style often shows increased use of perspective and recession under Western influence, like in the works of Ghulam Ali Khan, Ghulam Murtaza Khan, and Mazhar Ali Khan.

Many museums have significant collections of Mughal miniatures, like the National Museum of India, the Mehrangarh Museum Trust, the Rampur Raza Library, the Indian Museum, the British Library (which includes illustrated copies of the Razmnama and Khamsa of Nizami), the Walters Art Museum, the National Museum of Asian Art, the Victoria and Albert Museum the Metropolitan Museum of Art, the Cleveland Museum of Art, the Chhatrapati Shivaji Maharaj Vastu Sangrahalaya, the San Diego Museum of Art and the Royal Collection Trust.

== Artists ==
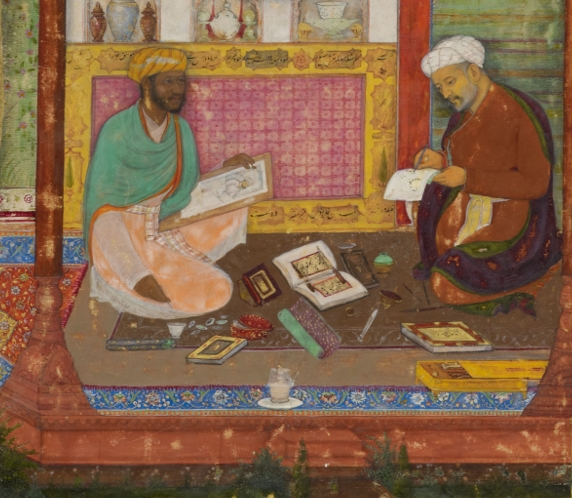
Detail from the Khamsa of Nizami manuscript in the British Library, made for Akbar, c. 1610, of Daulat (left) painting the calligrapher of the manuscript, Abd al-Rahim.

The Persian master artists Abd al-Samad, Mir Musavvir and his son, Mir Sayyid Ali, and Dust Muhammad who had accompanied Humayun to India in the 16th century, were in charge of the imperial atelier during the formative stages of Mughal painting. These Persian artists were masters of their craft, and had contributed to previous commissions like the Shahnameh of Shah Tahmasp. Dust Muhammad, who was a disciple of Kamāl ud-Dīn Behzād, had also worked in the compiling of Bahram Mirza Album and illustrations of the Cartier Hafiz.

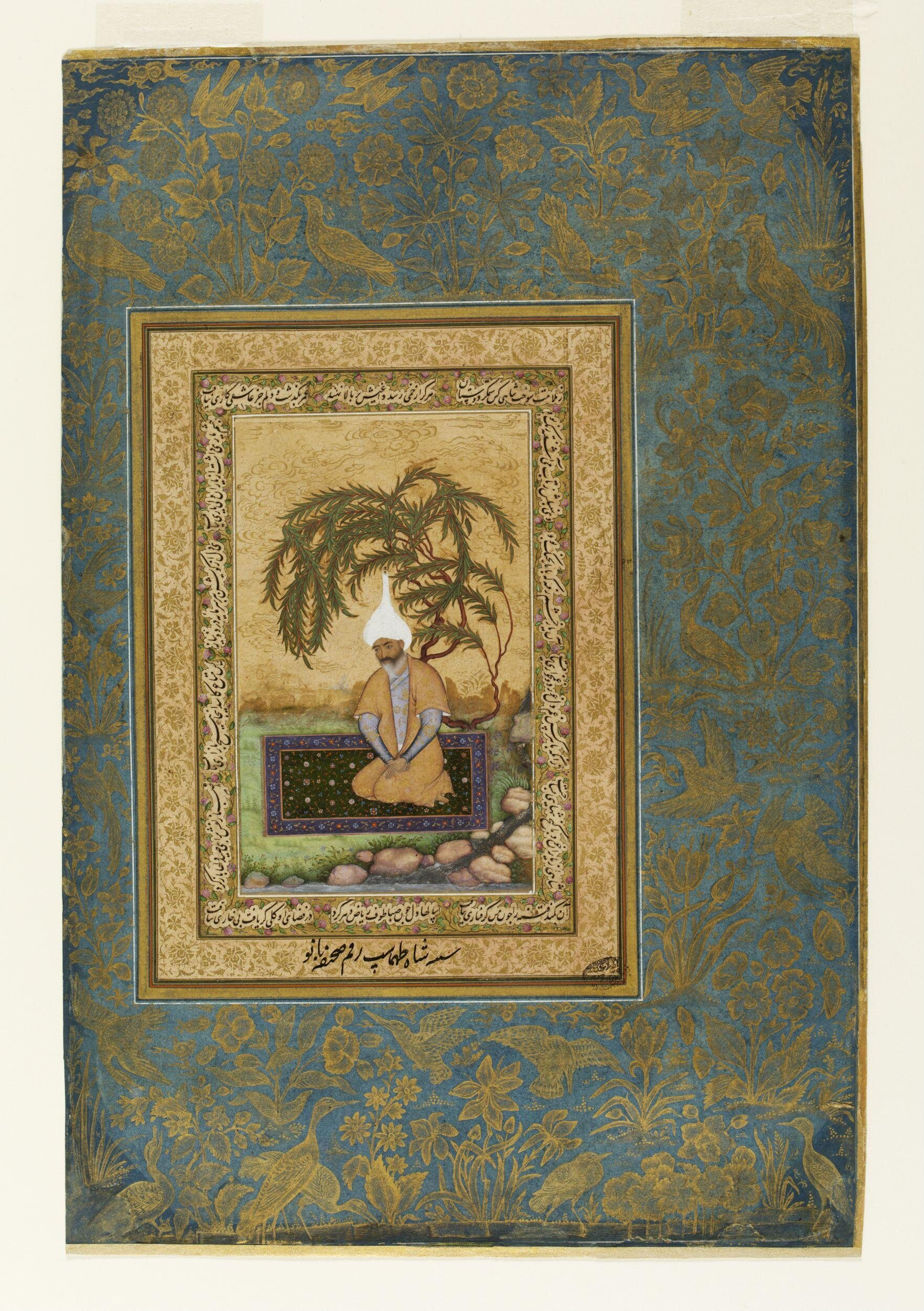
'Shah Tahmasp of Iran', early 17th century, Sahifa Banu, Victoria and Albert Museum. This portrait of Shah Tahmasp of Iran by done by a woman painter, Sahifa Banu, with borders by Mansur.

Many artists worked on large commissions, the majority of them apparently Hindu, to judge by the names recorded. Women artists were also a part of the Mughal atelier, and contributed to commissions, like in the Gulshan Album (Muraqqa'-e Gulshan), which included the work of at least three women artists. Artists like Sahifa Banu drew portraits and copies of compositions by Kamāl ud-Dīn Behzād and Sultan ‘Ali al-Mashhadi, while others like Ruqaya Banu, Nuri Nadira Bano & Nini, made copies of European engravings and prints in their own style. Mughal painting generally involved a group of artists, one (generally the most senior) to decide and outline the composition, the second to actually paint, and perhaps a third who specialized in portraiture, executing individual faces.

This was especially the case with the large historical book projects that dominated production during Akbar's reign, the Tutinama, Baburnama, Hamzanama, Razmnama, and Akbarnama. For manuscripts of Persian poetry there was a different way of working, with the best masters apparently expected to produce exquisitely finished miniatures all or largely their own work. An influence on the evolution of style during Akbar's reign was Keshav Das, who understood and developed "European techniques of rendering space and volume".

Conveniently for modern scholars, Akbar liked to see the names of the artists written below each miniature. Analysis of manuscripts shows that individual miniatures were assigned to many painters. For example, the incomplete Razmnama in the British Library contains 24 miniatures, with 21 different names, though this may be an especially large number.

Important painters under Akbar and Jahangir were:

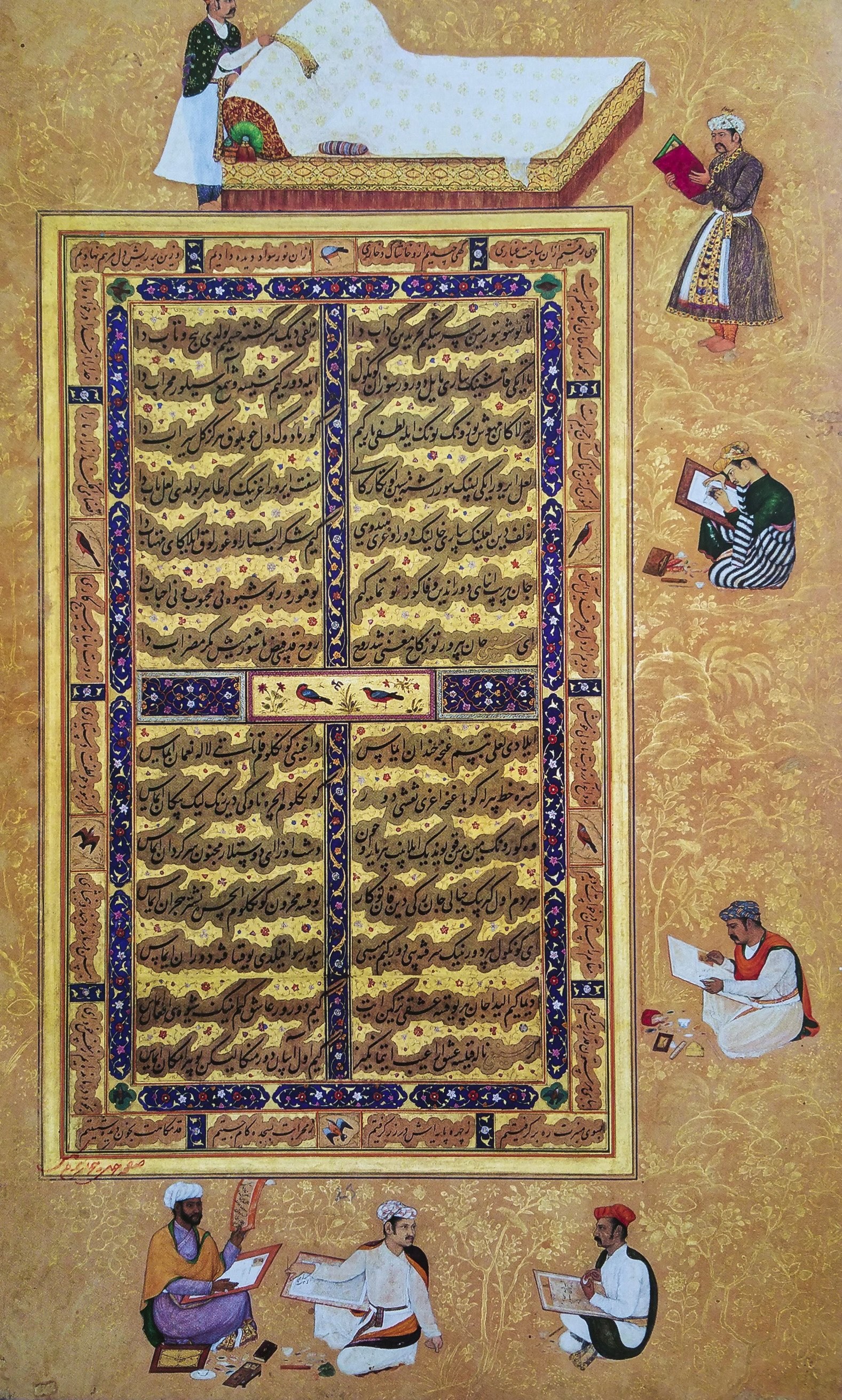
Self-portrait of the artist Daulat (starting from bottom left corner and going counter-clockwise) and portraits of the artists Govardhan, Bishandas, Manohar, Abu'l-Hasan, by Daulat, ca.1610. The self-portrait and portraits are found on the border of the folio. Gulshan Album (Muraqqaʿ-e Gulshan or Moraqqaʿ-e Golshan). Kept in the collection of the Golestan Palace Library, Tehran.

- Farrukh Beg (c. 1545 – c. 1615), a Persian artist, in India from 1585 to 1590, perhaps then in Bijapur, returning north from around 1605 to his death.
- Daswanth, d. 1584, who worked especially on Akbar's Razmnama, the Mahabharata in Persian.
- Basawan, (active c. 1580–1600), whose son Manohar Das was active c. 1582–1624.
- Daulat (c. 1595- c. 1635/40), began his career painting large narrative scenes, then specialized in portraits, but later in his career, seems to have specialized in highly ornate borders to miniatures.
- Govardhan, active c. 1596 to 1640, was especially good at portraits. His father Bhavani Das, had been a painter in the imperial workshop.
- Ustad Mansur (active c.1590–1624), a specialist in animals and plants.
- 'Abid (active c. 1604- 1645), was son of Aqa Riza and brother of Abu al-Hasan, who was trained in the principles of Persian painting.
- Abu al-Hasan (1589 – c.1630), son of Aqa Riza, and brother of 'Abid, who drew a number of allegorical paintings during Jahangir's region, like Jahangir Shooting the Head of Malik Ambar and Emperor Jahangir Triumphing over Poverty.
- Bichitr (active c. 1610–1660), who specialized in portraiture with a European influence.
- Nanha, a painter active in the courts of Akbar and Jahangir. He was uncle of Bishandas.
- Bishandas, (c. 1590- c. 1640) who specialized in portraiture.
- Mushfiq, an early example of an artist who seems never to have worked in the imperial atelier, but for other clients like Abd-ur-Rahim Khan-i-Khanan.
- Miskin (c.1560 - c.1604), an extremely skilled painter of animals.
- Sanwlah, who worked in the court of Jahangir.
- Farrukh Chela (active from 1580 or 1585/1604), contributed to most of the major illustrated manuscripts at the Mughal court.
- Keshav Das (active c. 1570 - c. 1604), who was ranked as fifth in the list of seventeen best painters of the imperial workshop by Abu'l Fazl. He was reputed mainly for his copies and adaptations of European engravings.
- Payag (c. 1591- c. 1658), his work was heavily influenced by European art.
- Balchand (active from c. 1595 - c. 1650), brother of Payag. Proficient in individual portraits and manuscript illustrations, his work was known for his empathetic quality and elegant detailing, like the 'Death of Ināyat Khān'.
- Mandu or Mandu Firangi (c. 1598) a European artist trained in Western arts who worked in Akbar's atelier. With Miskin and Bhagawan, he illustrated a few folios of the Ramayana from Akbar's reign in Maharaja Sawai Man Singh II Museum Trust, The City Palace, Jaipur.
- Mir Hashim, a seventeenth-century miniature portrait painter, active during the reigns of Jahangir and Shah Jahan.

Other notable painters included Muhammad 'Ali, Abd al-Rahim, Amal-e Hashim, and Mah Muhammad.

The sub-imperial school of Mughal painting included artists such as Mushfiq, Kamal, and Fazl, who were not a part of the royal atelier, and were patronised by nobles like Abd-ur-Rahim Khan-i-Khanan, who commissioned the Freer Rāmāyaṇa. During the first half of the 18th century, many Mughal-trained artists left the imperial workshop to work at Rajput courts, such as artists like Bhavanidas (active c. 1700- 1748) and his son Dalchand (active c. 1710- 1760), who moved to Jodhpur to work for Abhai Singh (r. 1724–1748), and then to Kishangarh around 1728.

== Mughal style today ==
Mughal-style miniature paintings are still being created today by a small number of artists in Lahore concentrated mainly in the National College of Arts, although many of these miniatures are just copies of the originals. Some artists have produced contemporary works using classic methods at times.

The skills needed to produce these modern versions of Mughal miniatures are still passed on from generation to generation, although many artisans also employ dozens of workers, often painting under trying working conditions, to produce works sold under the signature of their modern masters.

== Gallery ==
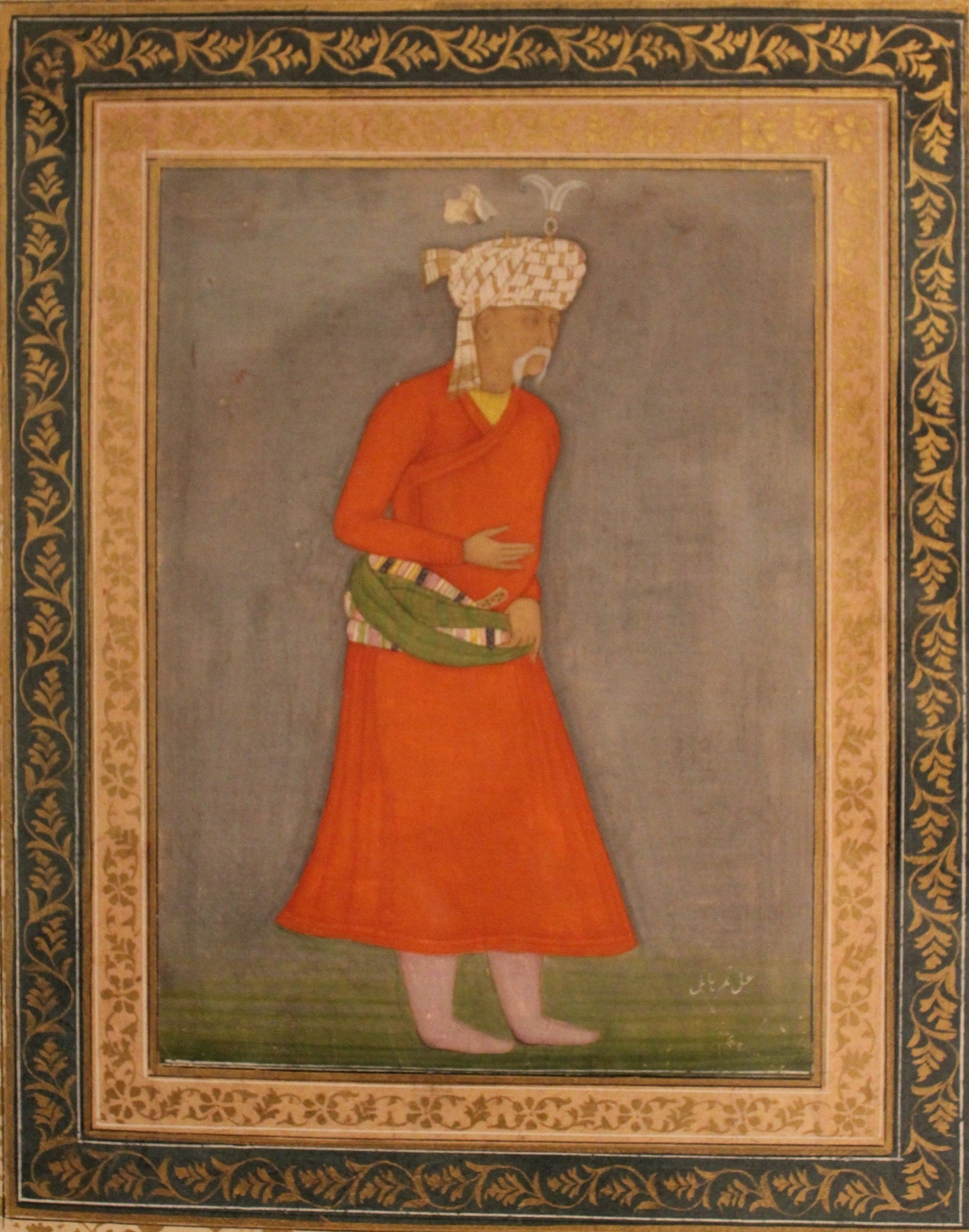
Portrait of Akbar

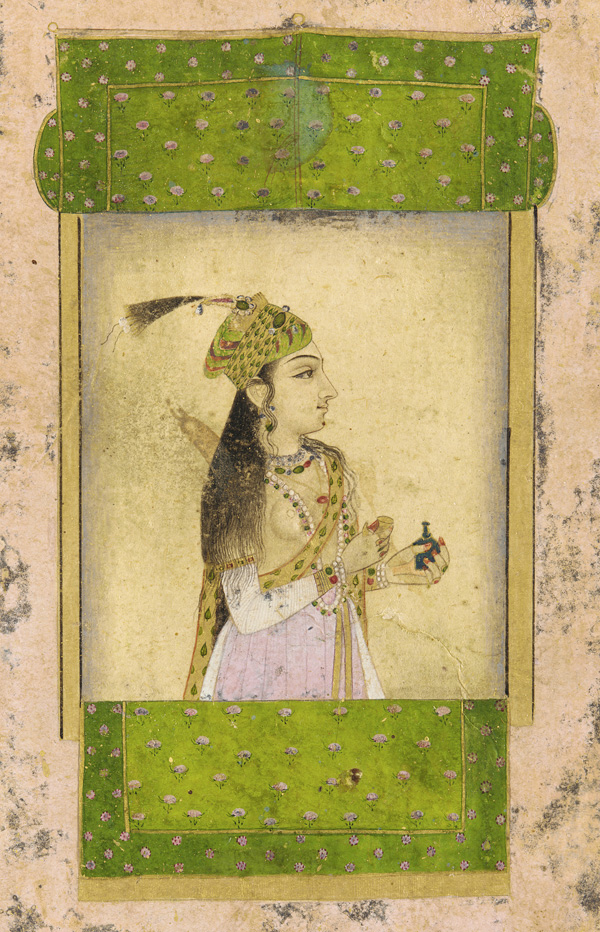
A noble lady, Mughal dynasty, India. 17th century. Color and gold on paper. Freer Gallery of Art F1907.219

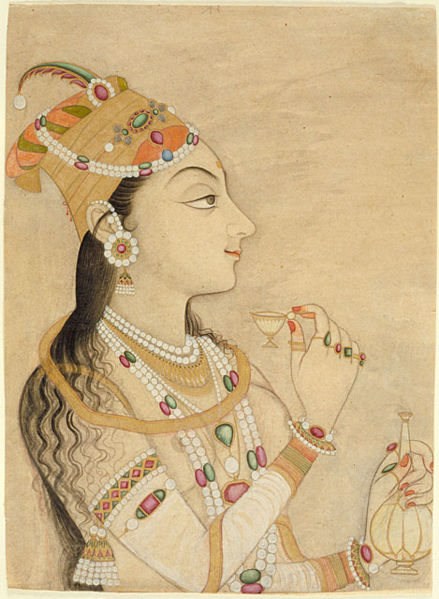
Nur Jahan

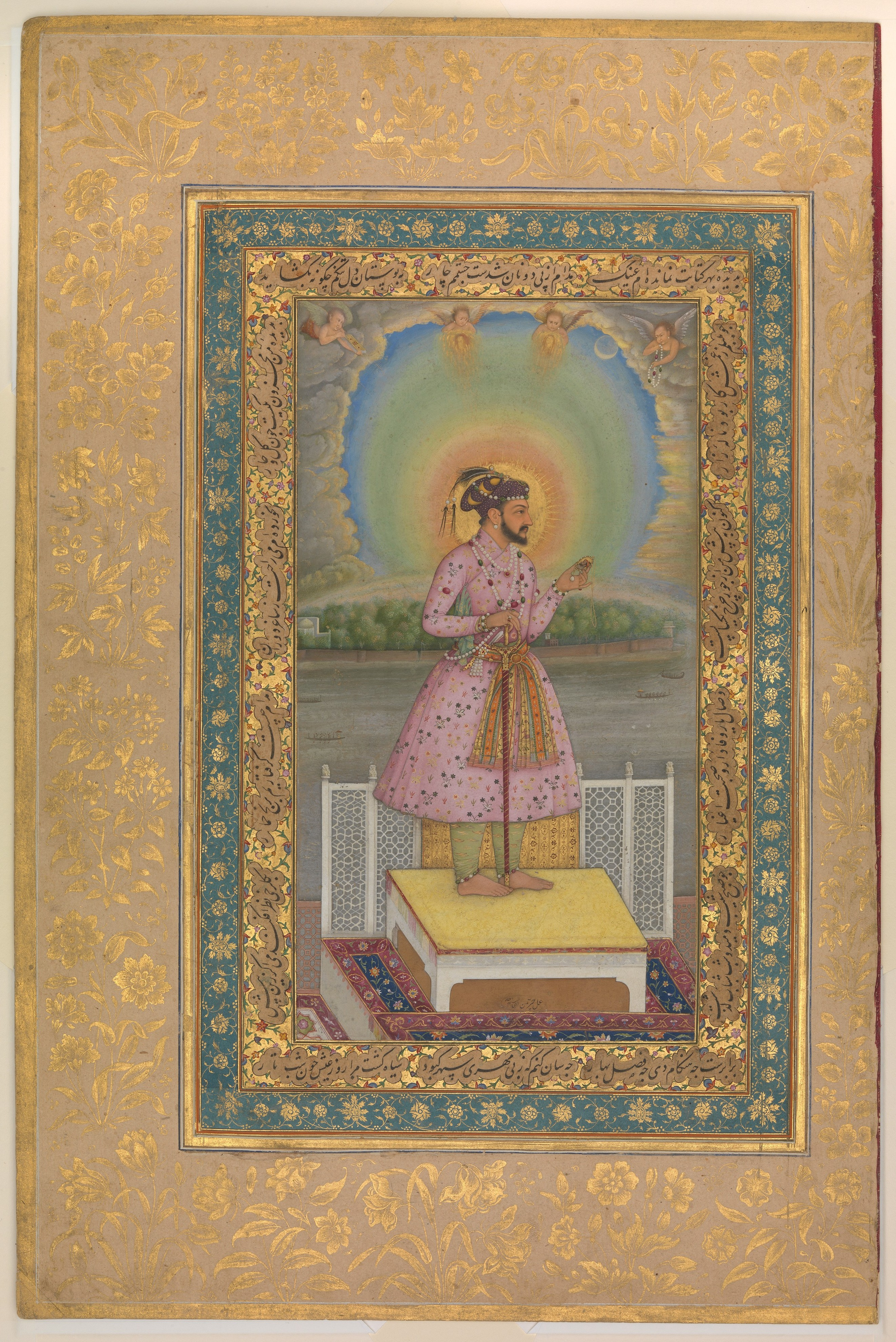
Shah Jahan on a terrace holding a pendant set with his portrait

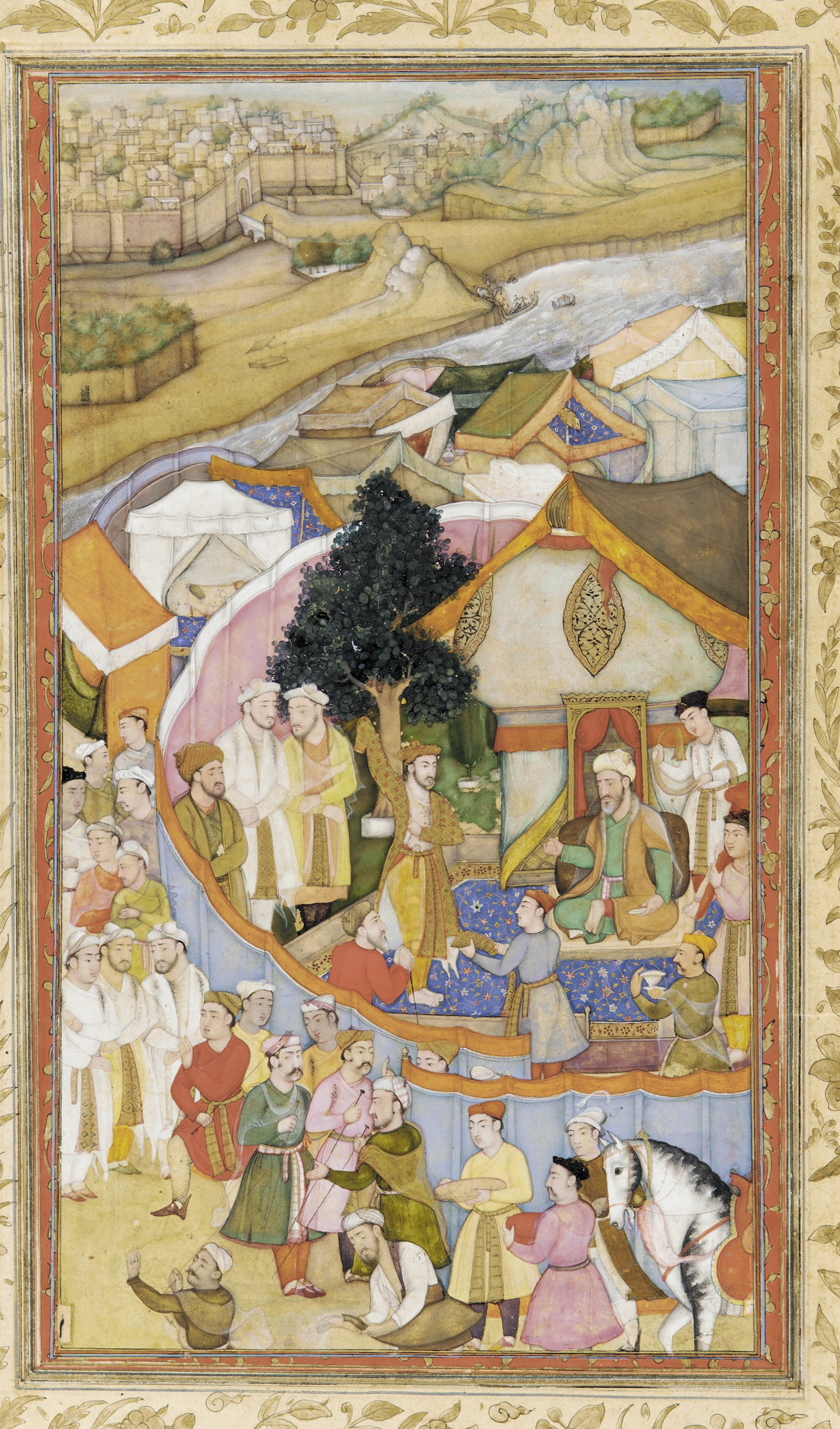
Daud Khan Karrani receives a Kaftan of honor from Munim Khan

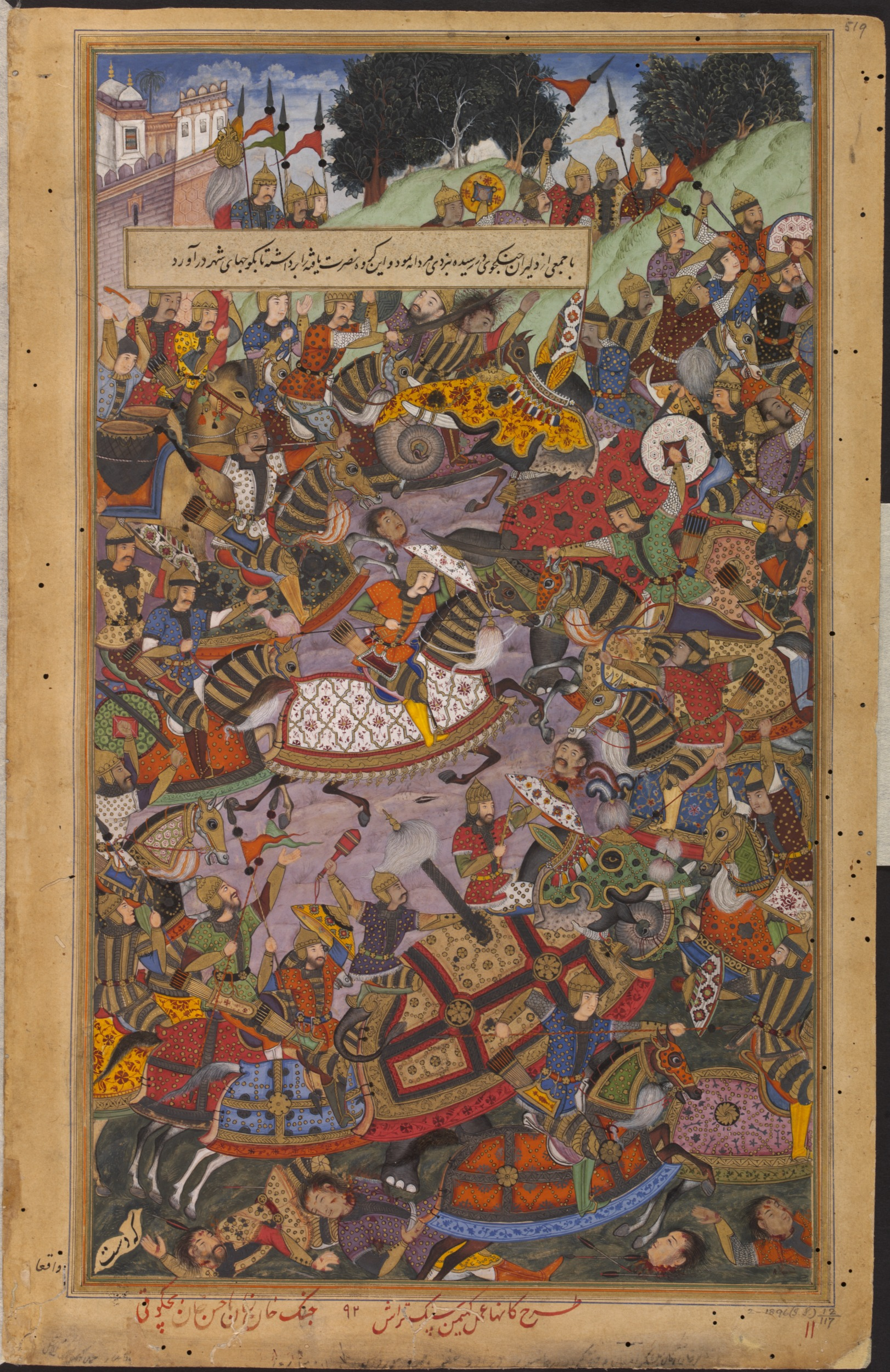
Victory of Ali Quli Khan on the river Gomti-Akbarnama, 1561

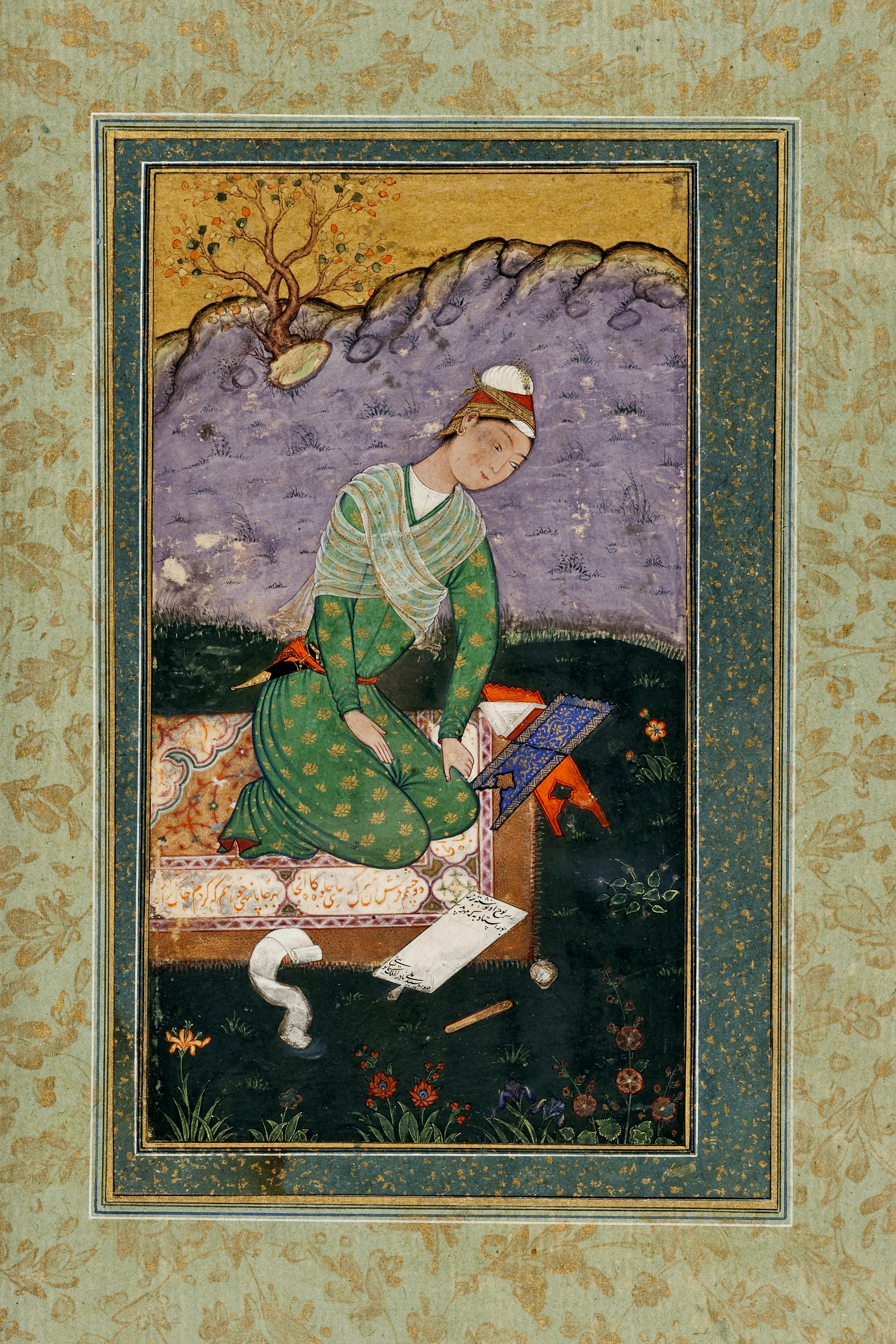
Mir Sayyid Ali's depiction of a young scholar in the Mughal Empire, reading and writing a commentary on the Quran, 1559.

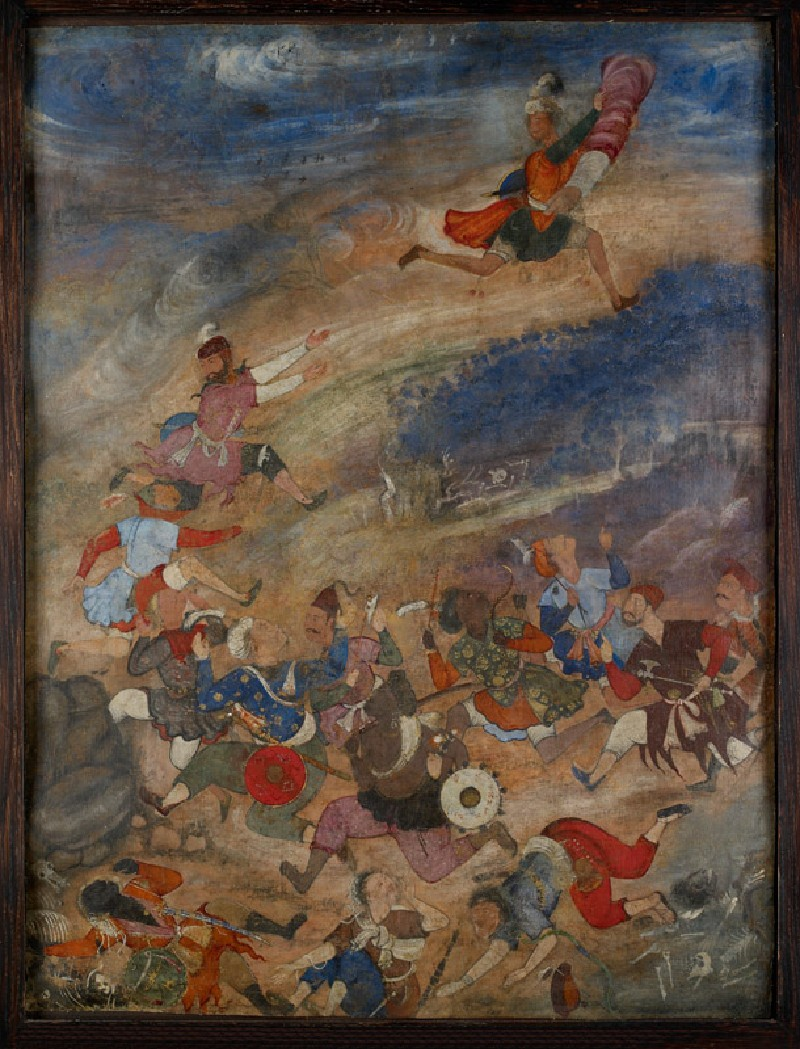
Battle scene from the Hamzanama of Akbar, 1570

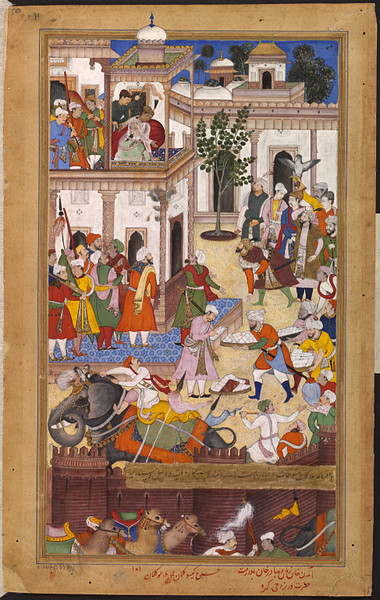
The Submission of the rebel brothers Ali Quli and Bahadur Khan. Akbarnama, 1590–95

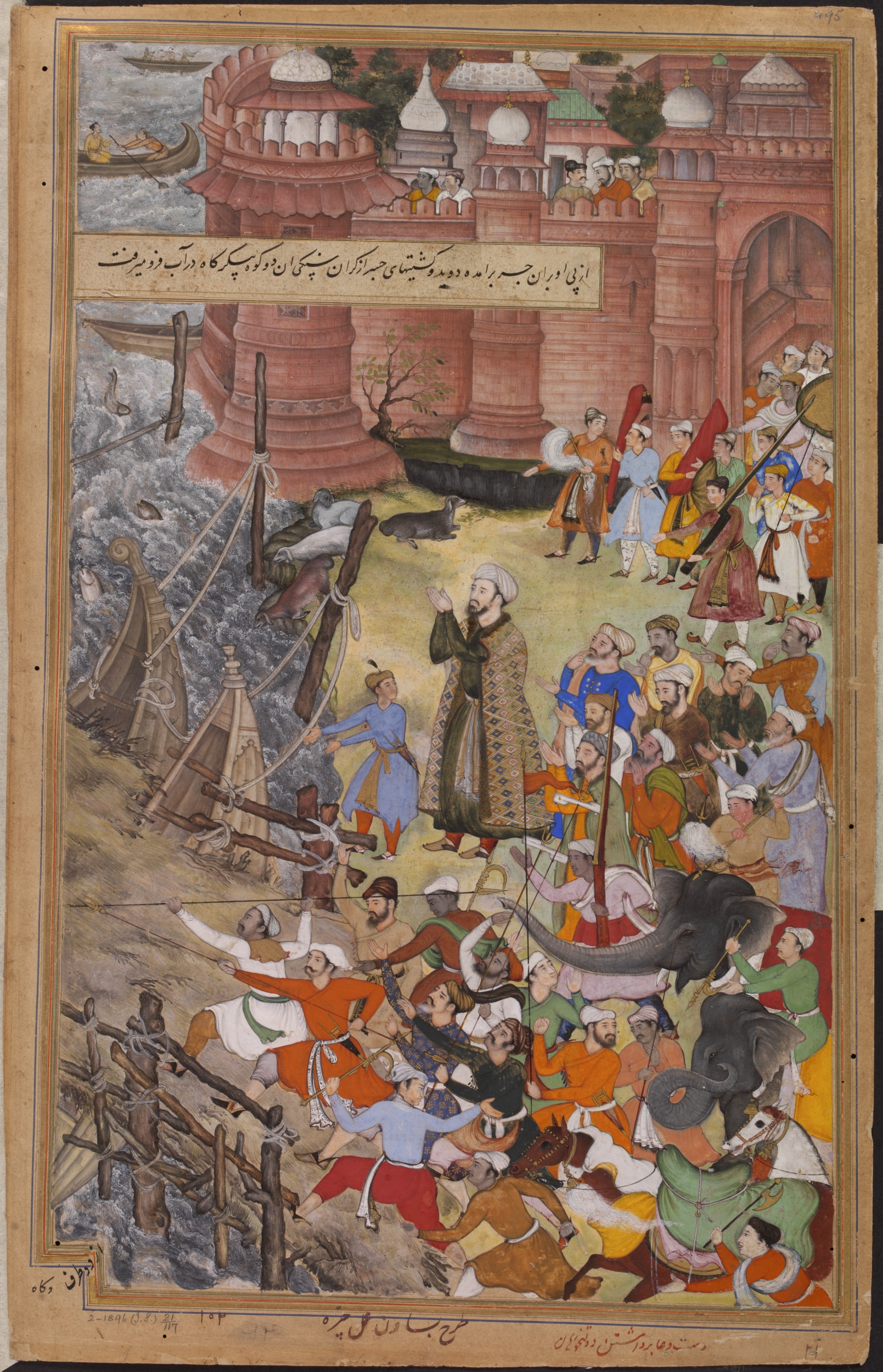
Akbar riding the elephant Hawa'I pursuing another elephant across a collapsing bridge of boats (right), 1561

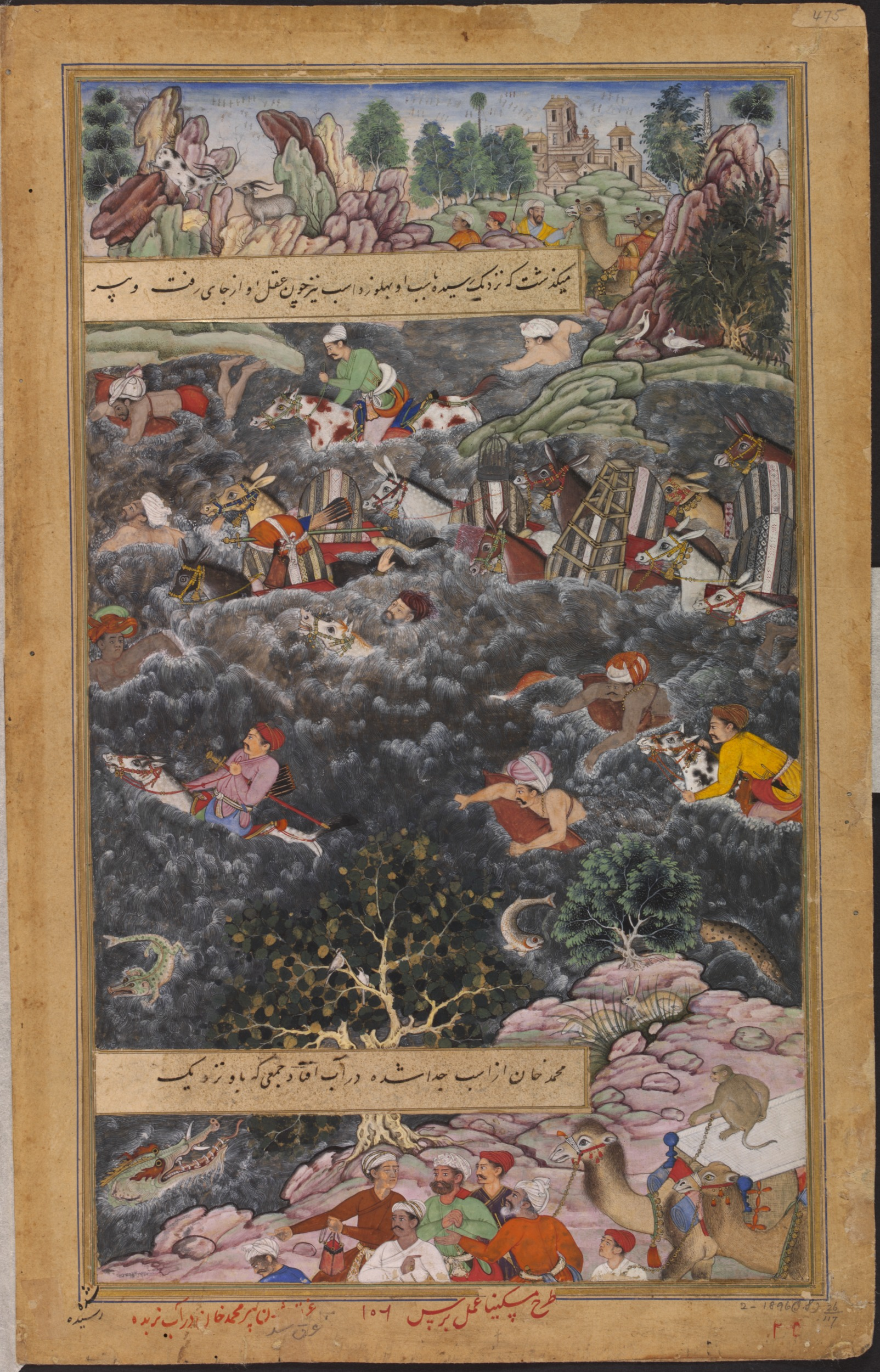
Pir Muhammad Drowns While Crossing the Narbada-Akbarnama, 1562

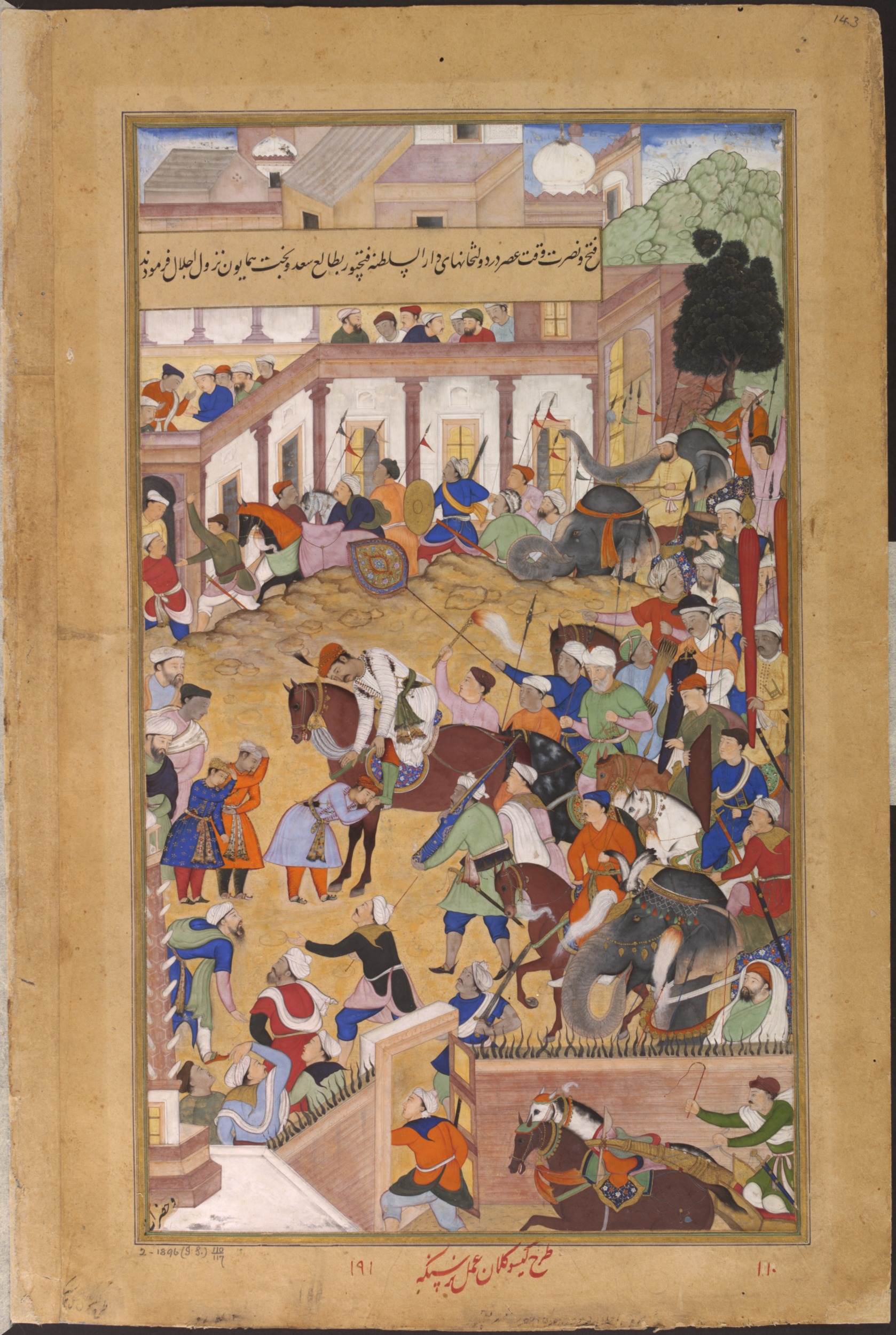
Akbar receiving his sons at Fatehpur Sikri. Akbarnama, 1573

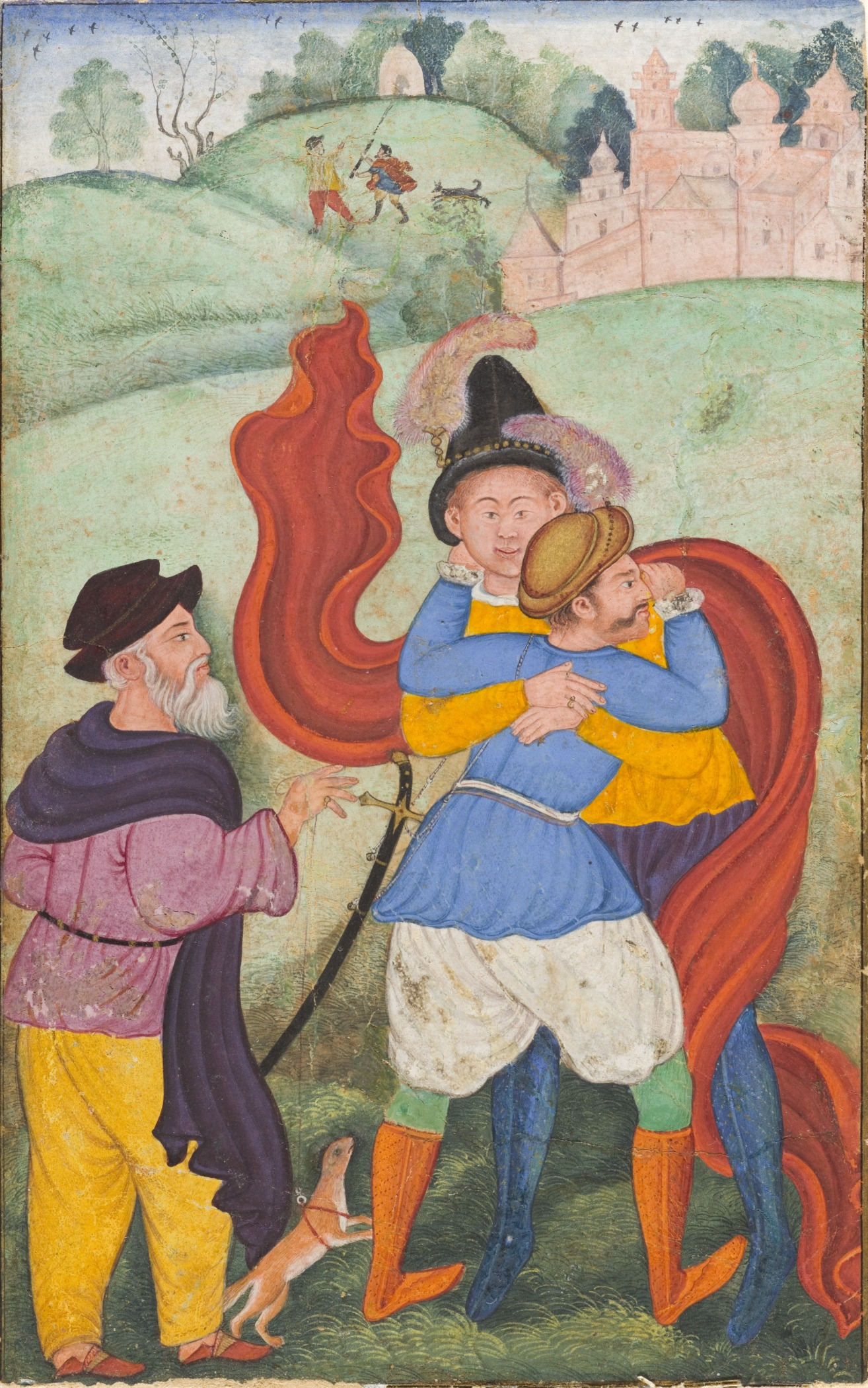
Europeans embracing, Lahore, c. 1590

Alexander is Lowered into the Sea, from a Khamsa (Quintet) of Amir Khusrau Dihlavi c. 1597–98, attributed to Mukanda

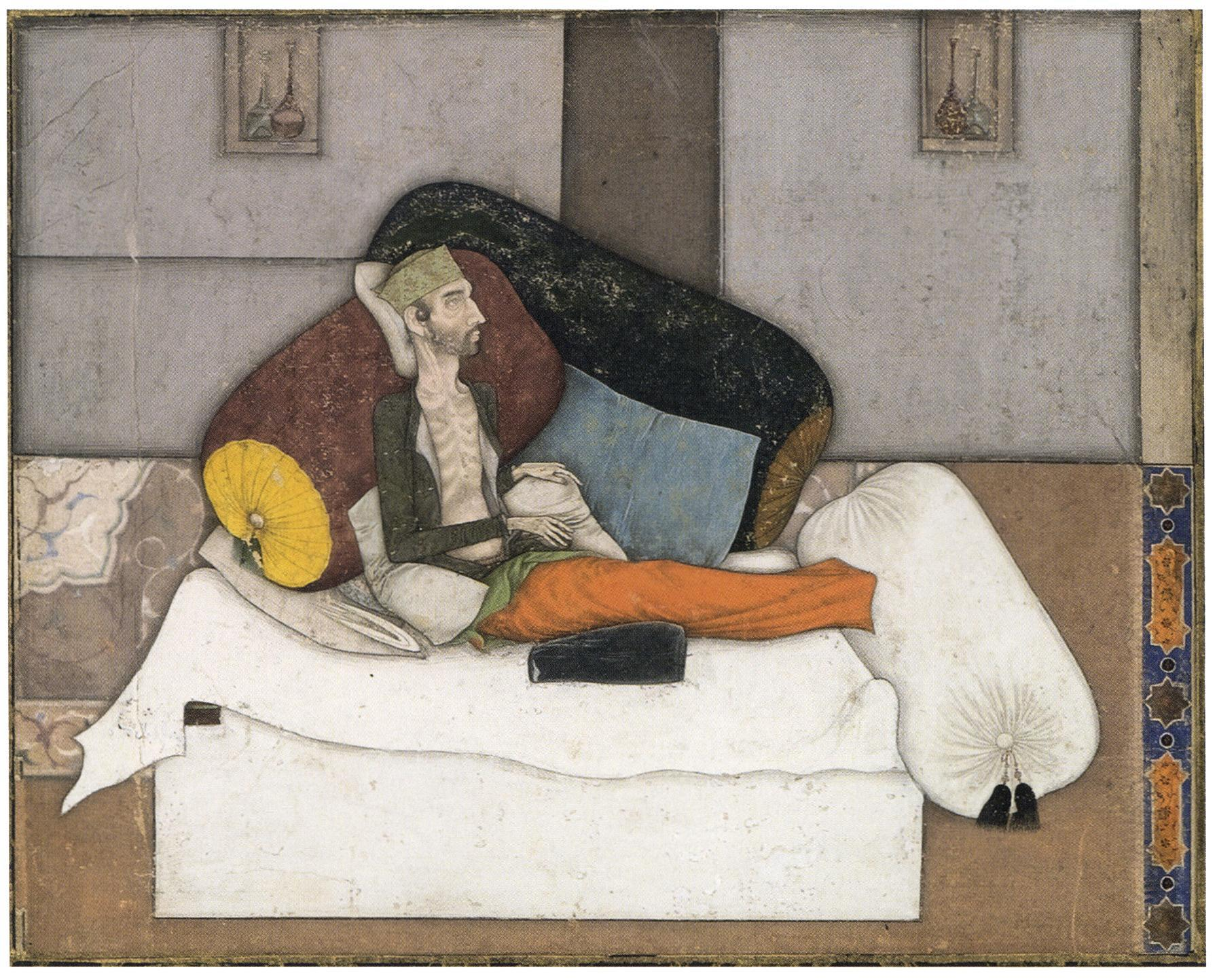
Balchand, The Dying Inayat Khan, c. 1618, Bodleian Library, Oxford

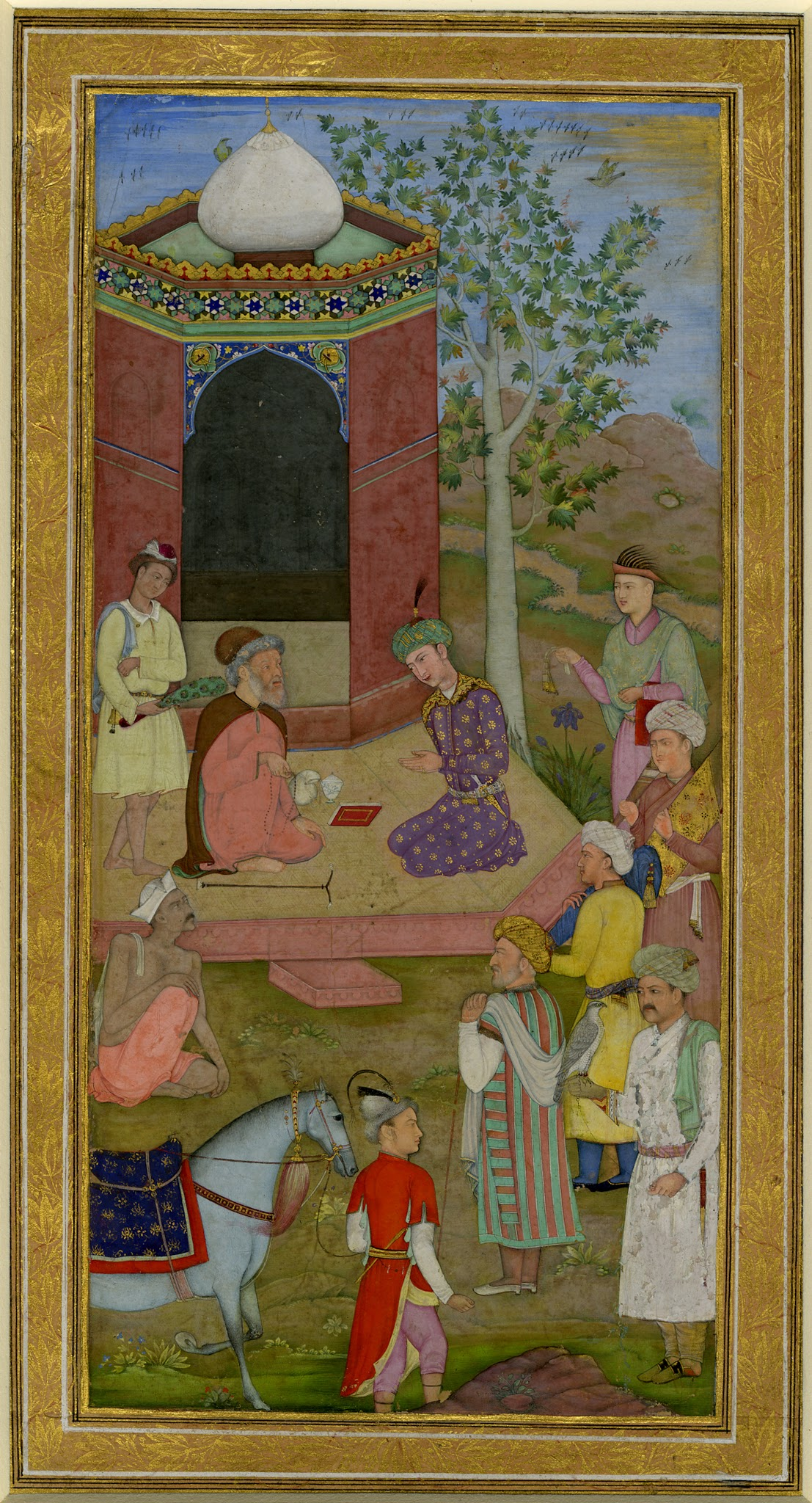
Mughal Prince visits a Holy Man

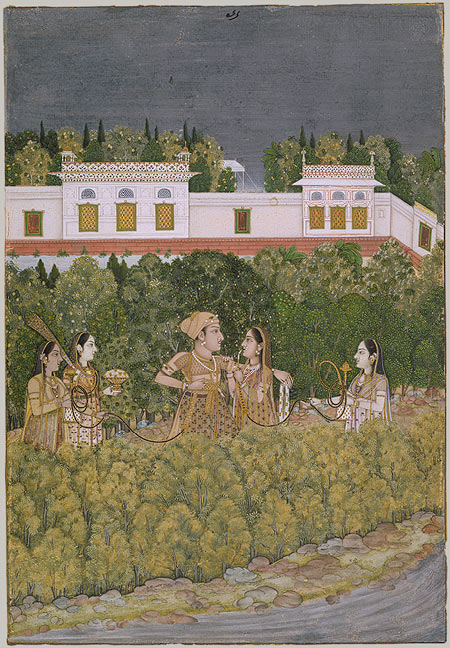
A Mughal prince and ladies in a garden, 18th century

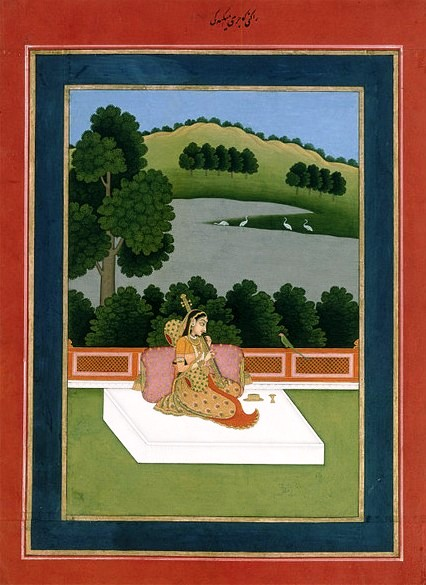
A young woman playing a Veena to a parakeet, a symbol of her absent lover. 18th-century painting in the provincial Mughal style of Bengal

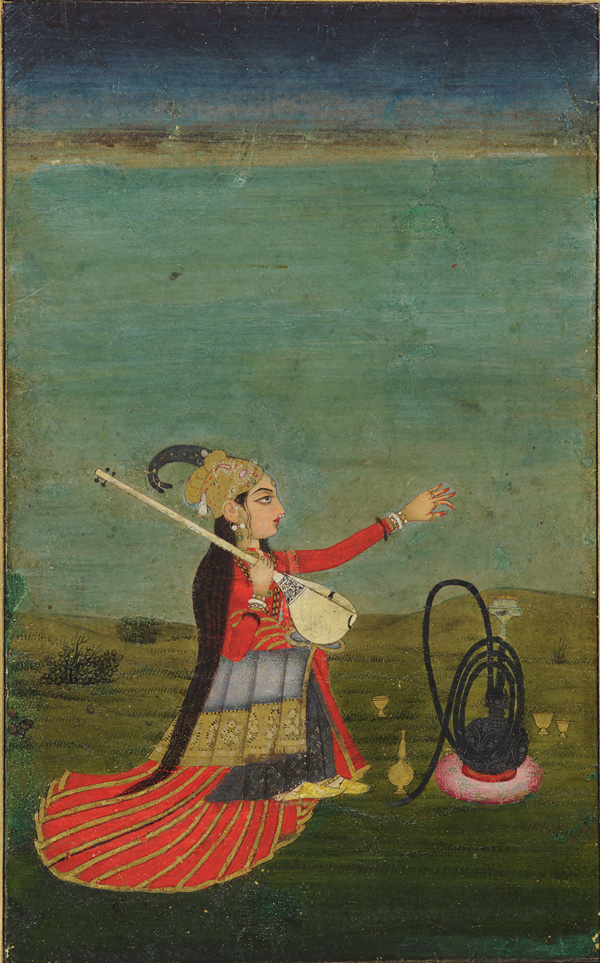
Female performer with a tanpura, 18th century. Colour and gold on paper. Freer Gallery of Art F1907.195

Ascetic Seated on Leopard's Skin, late 18th century

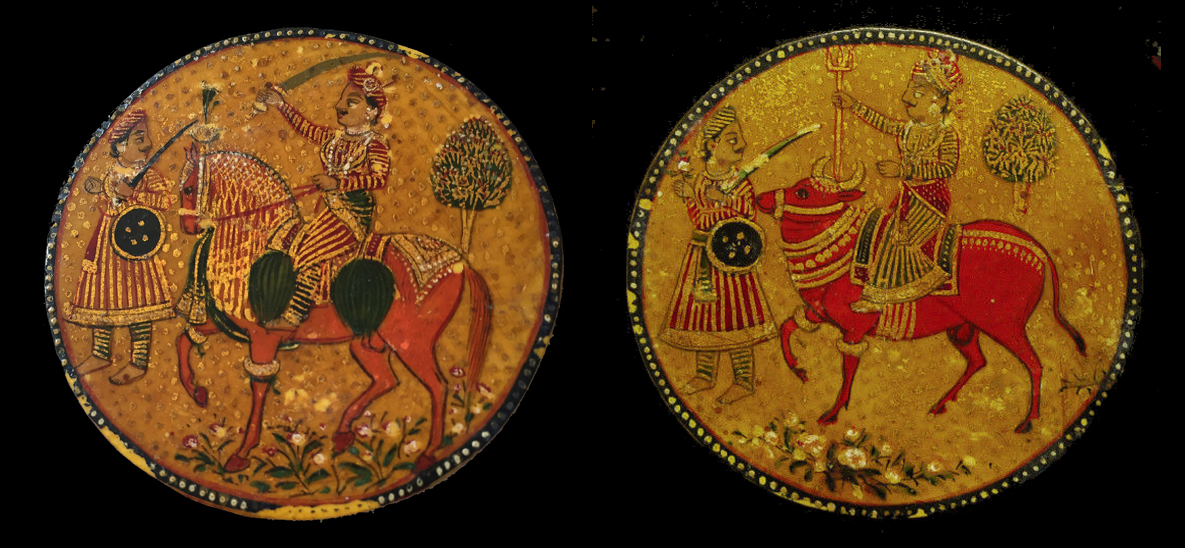
Mughal Ganjifa playing cards, early 19th century, with miniature paintings – courtesy of the Wovensouls collection

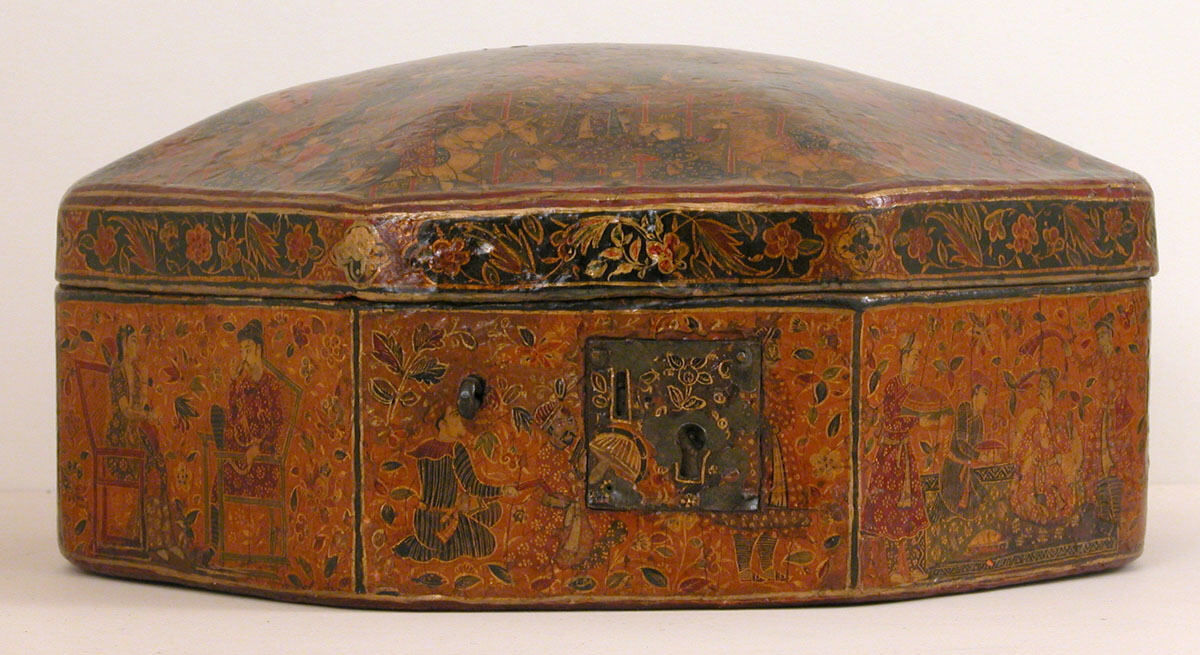
The figural decoration of this example shows a strong relationship to paintings of the 17th century.

== See also ==
- Arabic miniature
- Indian painting
- Madhubani painting
- Ottoman miniature
- Rajput painting
- Tanjore painting
- Western painting
- Persian miniature
- Islamic miniature
- Sikh painting
