= Mushfiq =

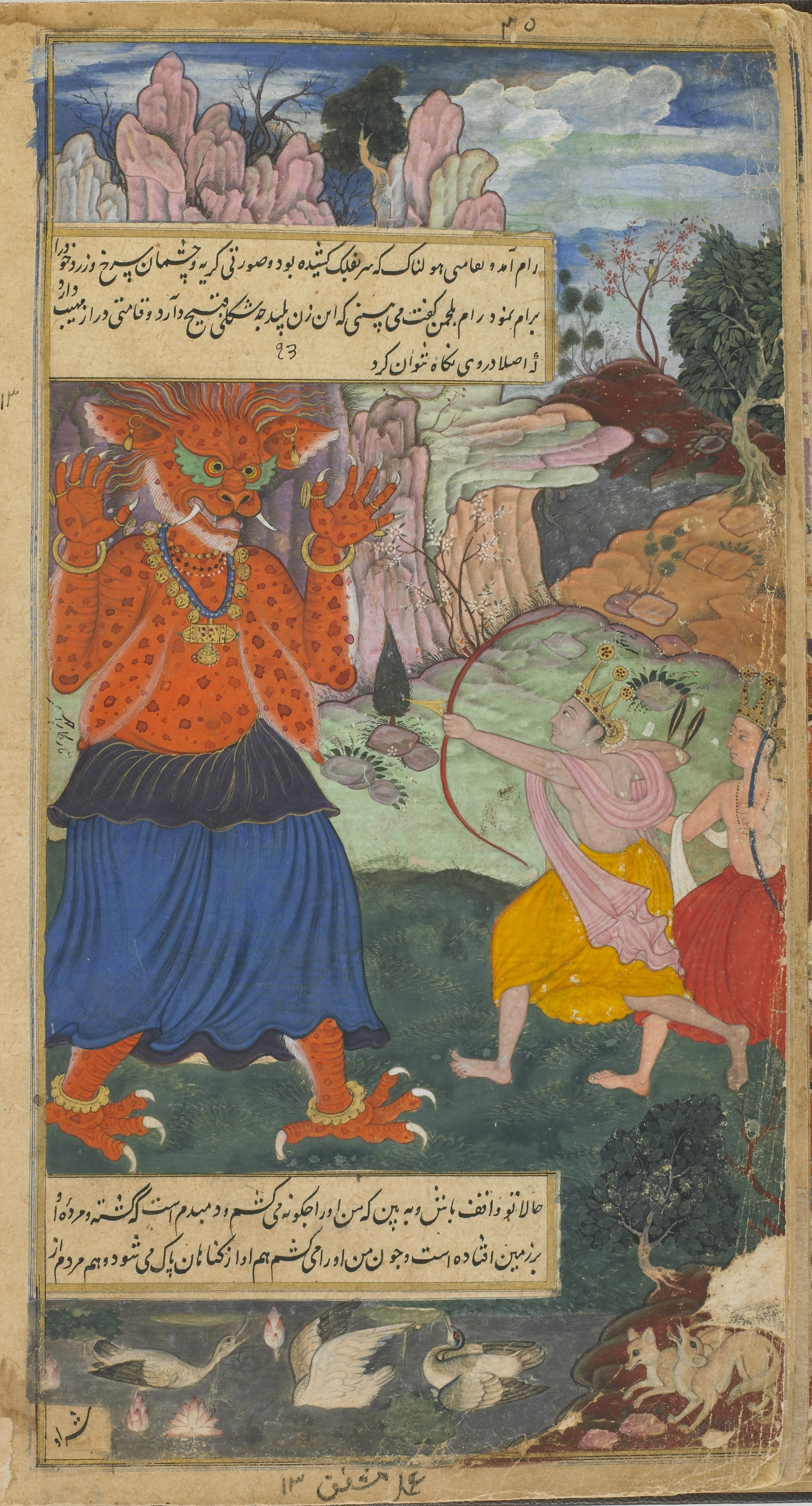
Rama and Laksmana attack Tataka, from the Freer Ramayana

Mushfiq was a sub-imperial Mughal painter who worked in the atelier of Abd-ur-Rahim Khan-i-Khanan (also called Abdul Rahim Khan-I-Khana), commander-in-chief of the Mughal army in the late 16th/early 17th century. He contributed numerous paintings to the Ramayana and Razmnama (Mahabharata) manuscripts commissioned by the Khan-i-Khanan. Several individual paintings in his hand, some of them signed, are also known. He is not known to have worked at Akbar or Jahangir's imperial workshops.
