= Miskin (painter) =

Mughal painter (c. 1560–1604)

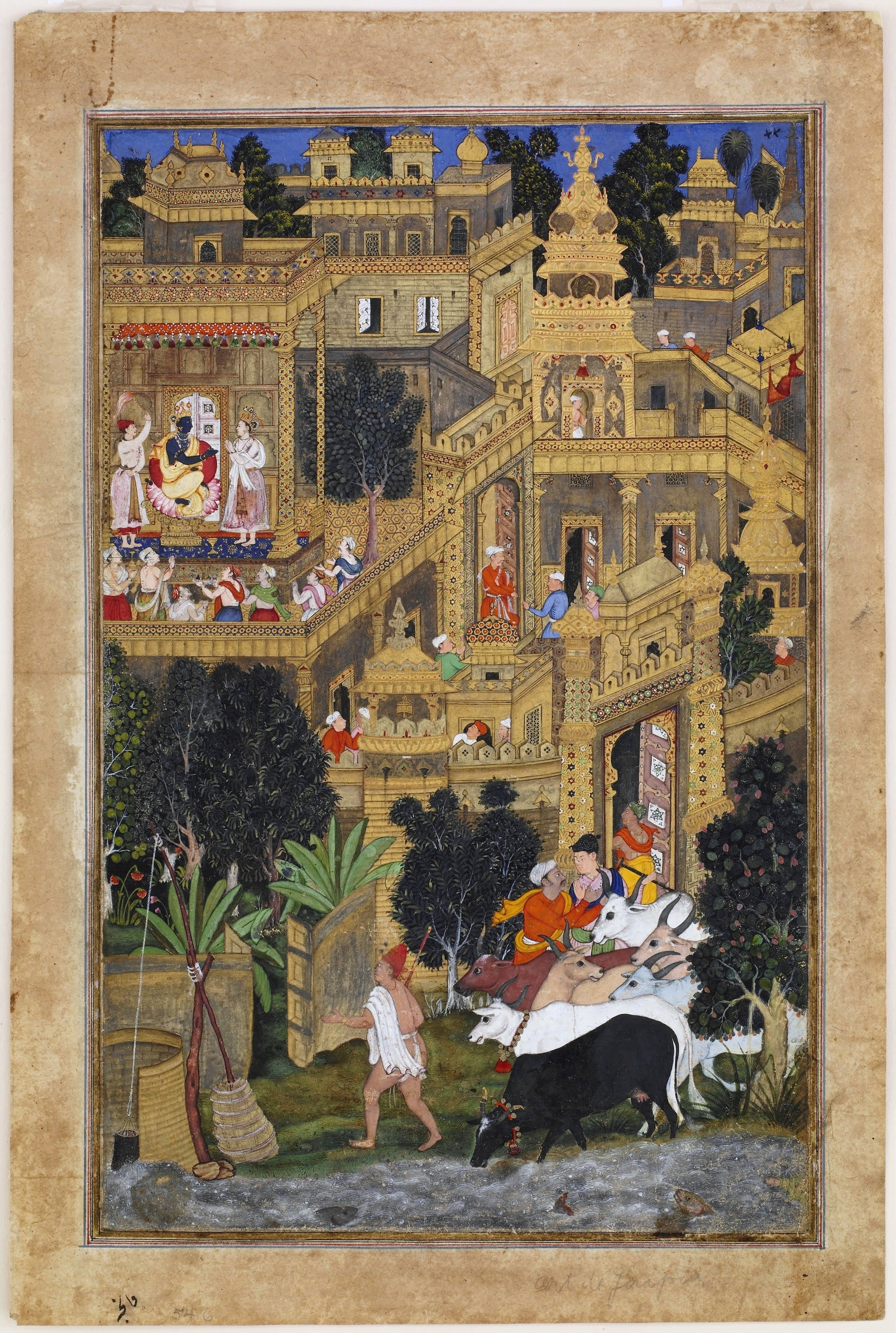
- A watercolor painting of Lord Krishna in the Golden City from the Harivamsha, attributed to Miskin
- Born: c. 1560
- Died: c. 1604
- Known for: Painting, Codices

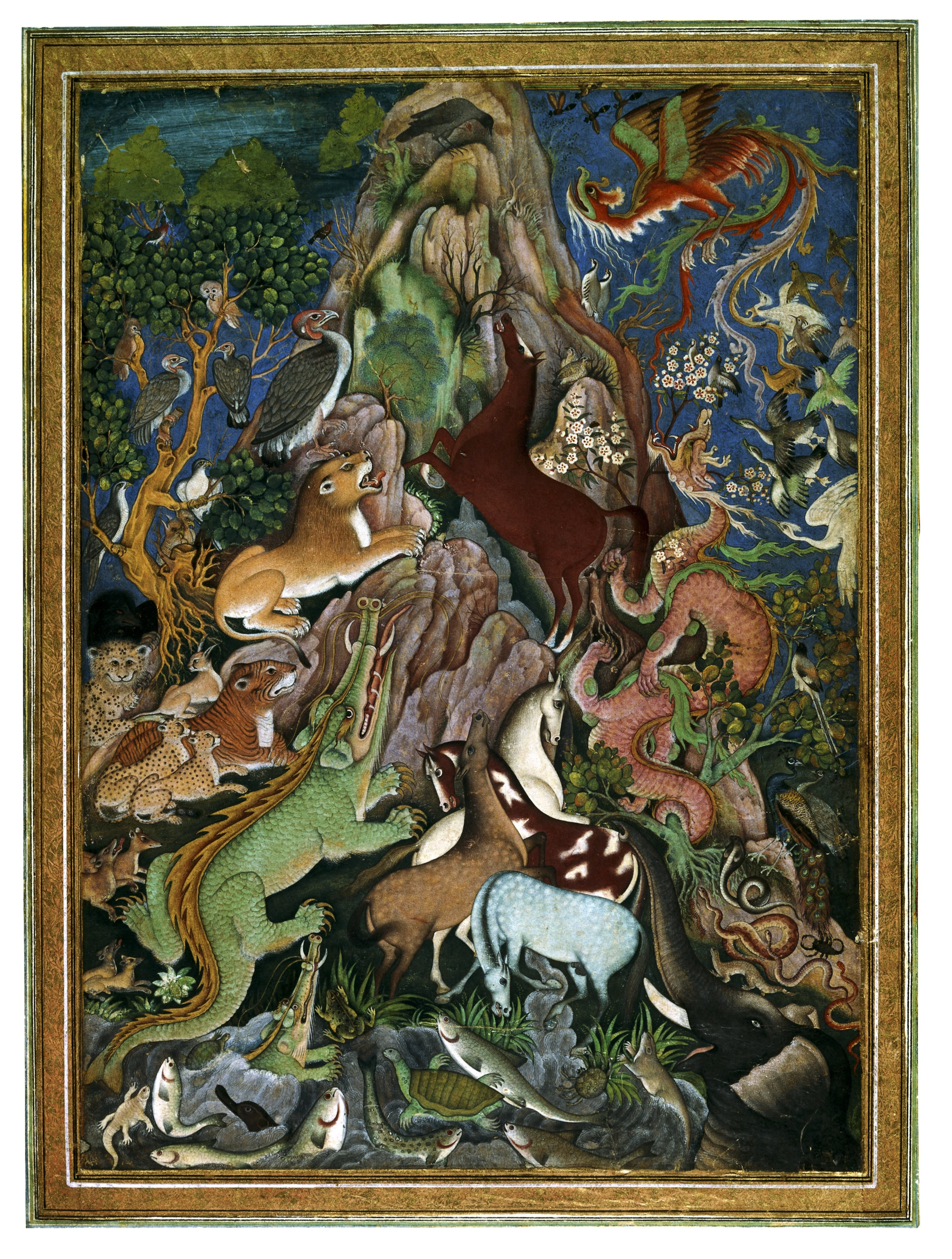
The crow addresses the animals (attribution). Circa 1590. British Museum

Miskin (c. 1560 - c. 1604), also known as Miskina, was a Mughal painter in the court of Akbar I. The name 'Miskin' itself is a pen name. Miskin is recorded by the historian and grand vizier of Akbar, Abu'l-Fazl, in a record containing a list of prominent Mughal painters. Further, he is regarded as an extremely skilled painter of animals.

== Life and work ==
Miskin was likely born around the year 1560, with little additional information being known about his early life save for his father, Mahesh, and brother, 'Asi, also working as artists.
