= Muraqqa-e Gulshan =

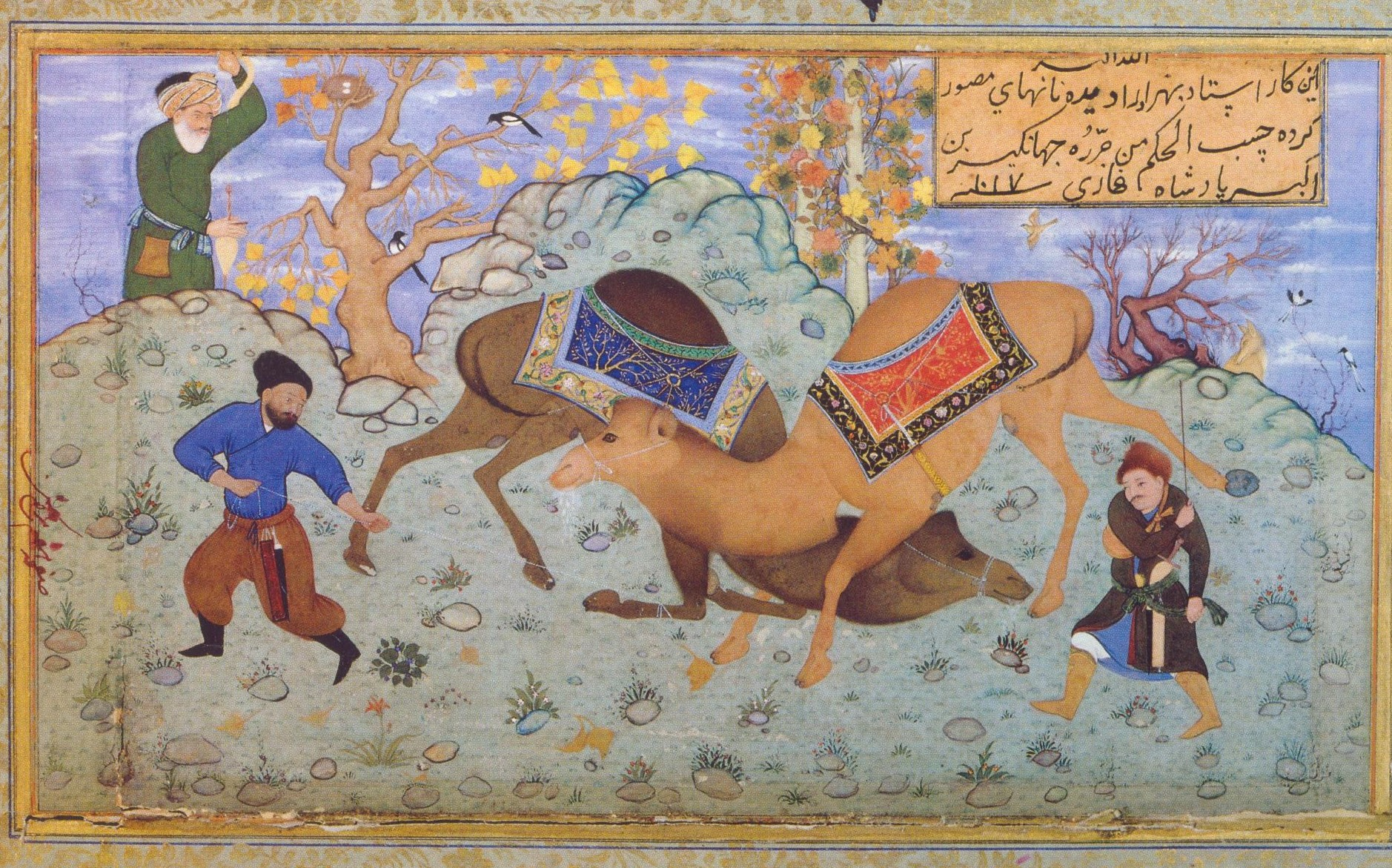
Camel fight, inscribed as a copy by Nanha of a work by the "master" Bihzad, Gulistan Palace Library

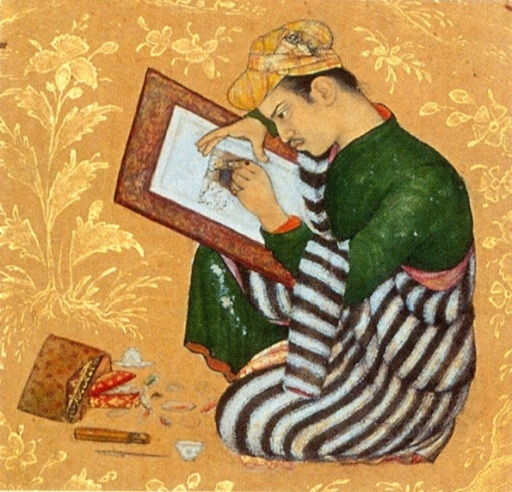
Portrait of Abuʿl-Hasan by Daulat, c. 1605–9, Gulistan Palace Library

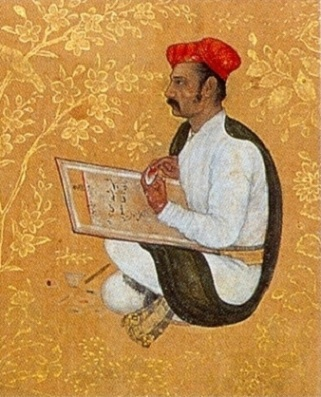
Portrait of Bishan Das by Daulat, c. 1605–9, Gulistan Palace Library

The Muraqqaʿ-e Gulshan or Moraqqaʿ-e Golshan ('Gulshan Album') is an eclectic album (muraqqa) of miniature paintings, drawings, calligraphy and engravings by Indo-Persian, Deccani, Turkish and European artists.

The album was compiled in early 17th century AD (11th century AH) Mughal India by Prince Salim (later Emperor Jahangir) as a source of wisdom and pleasure. Most of its surviving folios are in the library of Golestan Palace, Tehran.

== Provenance ==
It has been suggested, apparently without good evidence, that the Gulshan album was acquired by Nader Shah Afshar during his invasion of India and returned with him to Persia in 1741.

The core of the Gulshan album (92 folios) remains in the library of Gulistan Palace in Tehran (no. 1663), but many folios have been removed and are now scattered across art galleries and private collections worldwide. A group of some 25 folios was acquired in Persia by Heinrich Karl Brugsch in 1860–61 and became known as the Berlin Album; it is now in the Staatsbibliothek Preußischer Kulturbesitz.

The albums in Tehran and Berlin both now contain leaves from another, very similar Mughal album, the Muraqqaʿ-e Gulistan (Gulistan Palace Library, no. 1664). Both the Golshan and Gulistan albums are mentioned as the property of Shah Naser al-Din Shah Qajar while he was still crown prince in Tabriz, before his accession to the Sun Throne in 1848.

== History ==
The Gulshan album was an early project of the cultured Mughal emperor Jahangir (r. 1605–1627). Based on internal inscriptions, the collection was probably begun about 1599, while Jahangir was still Prince Salim, governor of Allahabad and son of the ageing Emperor Akbar, and continued till about 1609. The folios now in Berlin album were compiled later, c. 1608 – c. 1619.

The imperial albums were likely intended to be shown and discussed by the shah and his learned guests at certain intellectual soirées, such as the one held late in Jahangir's reign at Lahore, which is described by the visiting Persian poet known as Mutribi. The images and poems may also have been enjoyed at pleasure parties held within the royal palaces.

== Contents ==
The volume consists of facing pages of Persian calligraphy alternating with pages of illustration. The illustrated pages have decorative margins which typically depict either landscapes with birds and scenes of the chase or different types of abstract scrollwork and vegetal designs, whereas the margins of the calligraphic pages often include human figures (including some miniature portraits) and objects.

Some of the leaves were brought to Mughal India by Persian artists who moved there in the 16th century, and others were produced by the local court painters. There was also some recycling of images from old, unfinished manuscripts of famous works such as the Shahnameh of Ferdowsi, the Khamsa of Nizami and the Zafarnama of Sharaf al-Din ʿAli Yazdi.

=== Persian artists ===
- Kamal al-Din Bihzad
- Mirza ʿAli,
- Aqa Reza,
- Aqa Mirak,
- ʿAbd-al-Samad Shirazi,
- Mir Sayyed ʿAli.

=== Mughal artists ===
- Nanha,
- Daulat,
- Manohar Das,
- Basawan,
- Ustad Mansur,.

== Holdings ==
- Los Angeles County Museum of Art,
- Nelson Gallery-Atkins Museum (Kansas City),
- Edwin Binney III Collection (San Diego Museum of Art),
- Fogg Art Museum (Harvard University),
- Saint Louis Art Museum,
- Museum of Fine Arts (Boston),
- Freer Gallery of Art (Washington D.C.),
- Musée Guimet (Paris),
- Otto Sohn-Rethel Collection (Düsseldorf),
- Náprstek Museum (Prague),
- Art and History Trust (Houston, Texas).

== Bibliography ==
- Atil, Esin (1978). The Brush of the Masters: Drawings from Iran and India. Washington, D.C.: Freer Gallery of Art. pp. 100–1.
- Beach, Milo Cleveland (1965). "The Gulshan Album and Its European Sources". Bulletin of the Museum of Fine Arts. 63 (332): 63–91.
- Beach, Milo Cleveland (1978). The Grand Mogul: Imperial Painting in India, 1600–1660. United States of America: Sterling and Francine Clark Art Institute. pp. 24, 26, 43ff, 51, 74, 86, 92–4, 108, 110, 113, 116, 130, 131, 135, 140, 150, 183, 184, figs. 4, 8–10.
- Beach, Milo C.; Thackston, Wheeler M. (2016). "The Gulshan Album: Reading the Marginal Figures". Artibus Asiae. 76 (1): 5–36.
- Das, Asok Kumar (2012). Wonders of Nature: Ustad Mansur at the Mughal Court. Mumbai: The Marg Foundation. pp. 21, 23, 25, 30, 51, 54, 58, 61, 65, 69, 71, 72, 73–6, 78, 80, 83, 84, 94, 118, 126, 127, 139, 142, 143, 144, 148.
- Eslami, Kambiz (14 February 2012) [15 December 2001]. "Golšan Album". Encyclopædia Iranica. Vol. 11 (online ed.). pp. 104–8.
- Kühnel, Ernst; Goetz, Hermann (1926) [1924]. Indische Buchmalereien aus dem Jahangir-Album der Staatsbibliothek zu Berlin [Indian Book Painting from Jahangir's Album in the State Library in Berlin]. London and Berlin.
- Marshall, D. N. (1967). Mughals in India: A Bibliographical Survey. Bombay: Asia Publishing House. pp. 362–517.
- Welch, Stuart Cary; Schimmel, Annemarie; Swietochowski, Marie L.; Thackston, Wheeler M. (1987). The Emperors' Album: Images of Mughal India. New York: The Metropolitan Museum of Art. pp. 23–4, 26, 45–6, 136, 185, 296, 299.
