= Shah Jahan Album =

Series of Mughal miniatures painted 1620–1820

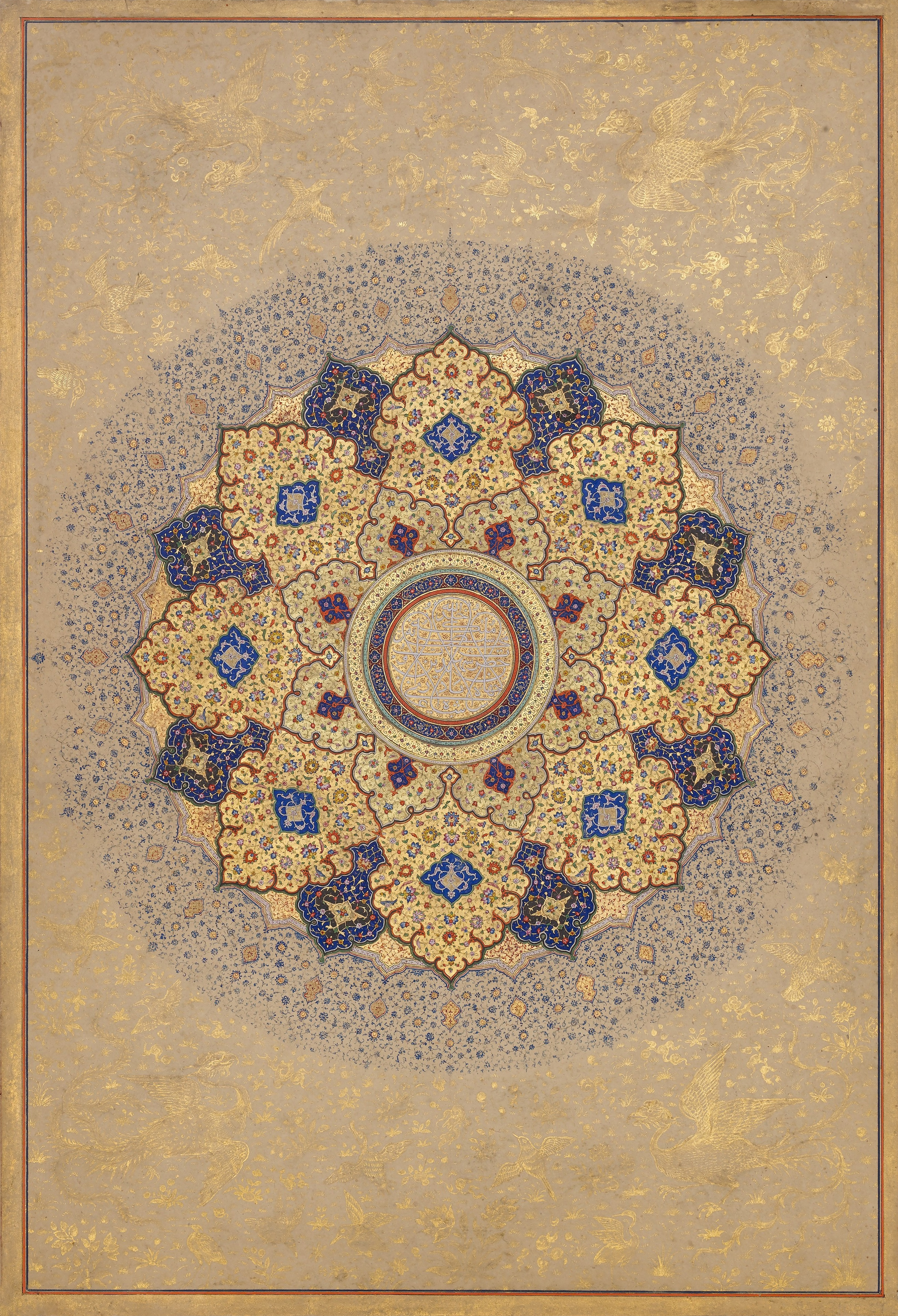
"Rosette bearing the Names and Titles of Shah Jahan", Folio from the Shah Jahan album

The Shah Jahan Album, also known as the Kevorkian Album or the Emperor's Album, is a series of Mughal miniatures dating between 1620–1820 from Mughal India. The album was intended for a private audience, likely consisting of the royal family and close friends. The folios are generally 15 5/16 inches (38.9 cm) by 10 1/4 inches (26 cm), however there are slight variations in height and width across the folios. The paintings for the folios were made by various artists and their workshops such as Nanha and Mansur while the calligraphic text for the folios were made by famous calligraphers such as Mir Ali Heravi. Emperor Jahangir (r. 1605 - 1627) started the tradition of commissioning folios for the album which was continued by his successors Shah Jahan and Aurangzeb.

In 1820, eleven more folios, referred to as the Late Shah Jahan Album, were added and the album was rebound. In total the album contains fifty folios generally focusing on nature based still lives and portraits of royalty and favored members of the royal court. The entirety of the album is now in the United States with nine of the folios being held at the Freer Gallery of Art in Washington D.C., while the remaining forty one held in the Metropolitan Museum of Art in New York City.

== History ==
Emperor Jahangir first started commissioning folios for the Shah Jahan Album around 1620. When he died in 1627 continuing the album fell to his successor and son, Shah Jahan. Shah Jahan added more portraits and illuminations, most of which are differentiated by the inclusion of Nasta'liq script and through a change of style. The original Kevorkian album's last owner was Shah Jahan's son and usurper Aurangzeb who added only an impression of his seal on a pre-existing rosette. The album, along with many other Mughal miniatures, left the royal library sometime in the early nineteenth century. It is assumed that it ended up in the hands of a Delhi art dealer who also commissioned other miniatures imitating the seventeenth century style to accompany his preexisting collection. All of these folios were bound together resulting in the Kevorkian album in museums today. In 1929 the Shah Jahan album was bought by Mr. and Mrs. Jack S. Rofe from an antiques shop in Scotland. After the couple got the album appraised at Sotheby's they sold it for £10,500 to Hagop Kevorkian, a New York collector and art dealer. In 1939 and 1948 Mr. Kevorkian offered nine folios to the Freer Gallery of Art in Washington D.C. and in 1955, the Metropolitan Museum of Art in New York bought the remaining forty one folios from Kevorkian.

== Overall visual style/description ==
Although the album was originally bound together, today it is viewed in separate leaves. In its original bound state the viewer would have first seen a Shamsa or sunburst vignette surrounded by mythical animals and golf leaf foliage. This would have been followed with an illuminated double page frontispiece called an 'unwan after which would have followed the various miniatures and calligraphy pages that make up the album. The general folio layout consists of one side with calligraphic text surrounded by a decorative border and another corresponding side with a miniature painting similarly surrounded by a decorative border. These two sides would face each other so that when the viewer opened to a page there would be a calligraphy page on one side with the corresponding painting facing the calligraphy. The folios were often made in workshops with multiple artists and apprentices contributing to different steps in the process. The images themselves were typically nature based still lives or portraits. The album contains many images in the Akbari or Jahangiri style. In particular, the focus on court life and hunting scenes showcase this style.

The folios generally fall into two groups based on the numbering of the borders. Group A contains pairs where the painting would have been first while Group B folios would have the calligraphic page first.

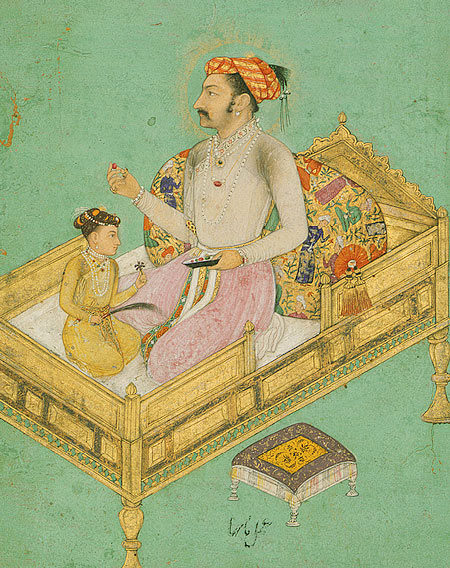
"Shahjahan and Prince Dara-Shikoh Toy with Jewels", Folio from the Shah Jahan Album

Emperor Jahangir utilized portraiture as a means of gaining psychological insight into the sitter rather than simply immortalizing them, resulting in the more realistic and natural style associated with his commissioned portraits such as in 'Shahjahan and Prince Dara-Shikoh Toy with Jewels'. Outside of portraits, Emperor Jahangir's miniatures were characterized by a dynamic and naturalistic style seen even through the borders, showcasing flowers and animals. As the emperor personally enjoyed animals and nature there are many nature based still lives in the album in addition to portraits. Another differentiating facet of miniatures from Jahangir's time is the introduction of a "golden age" theme which was popularized during his and his successor's reigns. The theme is primarily showcased through both the use of actual gold in the miniatures and through various animals and symbols, such as globes, in the borders and images themselves.

Emperor Shah Jahan focused more of his artistic patronage on architecture rather than on illuminated manuscripts, being most well known for the Taj Mahal. However, he did continue to contribute to the Shah Jahan album. Under Shah Jahan the portraits in particular took on a more formal and staged style, reflecting the increasingly formal court atmosphere. Frequent touch ups and polishing may also have contributed to the staged nature of the leaves commissioned by Shah Jahan. His portraits are nearly always in profile and reflect un-aging features, in stark contrast to the realistic wrinkles in Jahangir's portraits. The borders in the leaves commissioned by Shah Jahan also reflect this change to a more static and less naturalistic tendency, emphasizing pattern over individuality.

Unlike his two predecessors, Aurangzeb did not actively patronize the arts, contributing only his seal to a preexisting shamsa in the main Kevorkian album.

Folios from the late Shah Jahan album are considered to be less expressive and flatter than the older folios. In the Late Shah Jahan Album the contents of the borders were more closely related to the images they were framing, often alluding to the sitter's achievements or personality quirks. In addition, the main Kevorkian album seems to have portraits that feature sitters who aren't contemporary to when the image was made while the Late Shah Jahan album featured more contemporary sitters.

== Artists ==
- Manohar
- Govardhan
- Nanha
- Payag
- Balachand
- Mansur
- Daulat
- La'lchand
- Chitarman
- Murad

== Calligraphers ==
- Mir Ali Heravi
- Sultan 'Ali al-Mashhadi
