= Hagop Kevorkian =

Armenian-American archeologist, connoisseur of art and collector

- Յակոբ Գէորգեան
- Born: 1872; Kayseri, Ottoman Empire
- Died: February 10, 1962; Paris, France

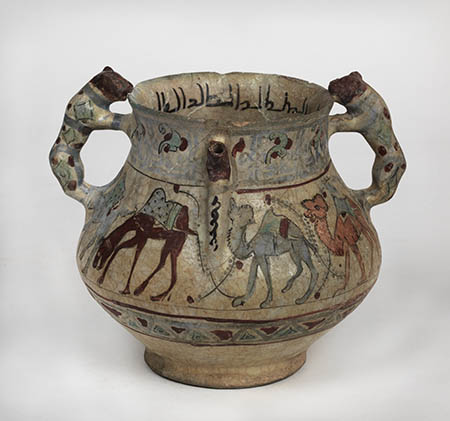
Polychrome painted vessel with marching camels and lion handles; a Kufic inscription surrounds the rim; found at Rhages, the ancient Median city of Rhei; probably 11th century AD; purchased from H. Kevorkian, 1915; courtesy of the Penn Museum, image no. 296835, object no. NEP90

Hagop Kevorkian (Armenian: Յակոբ Գէորգեան; 1872 – 1962) was an Armenian-American art dealer and collector. Originally from Kayseri, and a graduate of the American Robert College in Istanbul, he settled in New York City in the late 19th century, and was responsible for drawing greater attention to Near Eastern and Islamic artifacts in the United States.

== Career ==
Kevorkian carried out commercial excavations in Persia, in Sultanabad from 1903 and at the medieval city of Rey from around 1907 and assembled an outstanding collection of Oriental art, especially Islamic and Persian. He organized several exhibitions of Islamic ceramics in Paris and London in 1911 which were criticized by contemporary archeologists and art historians as part of a general trend in the looting and excavation of Iranian archeological sites by foreigners for the sale of antiquities in the European art market. Along with excavated pieces the exhibitions featured ceramics and objects taken from extant sites such as ceramic pieces and fragments from Qom. The works excavated under his supervision were later shown again in New York in 1914. Major sales of Islamic pieces from his collection, including lacquer doors and tile panels from Isfahan, books and paintings, carpets and ceramics, were held in the 1920s at the Anderson Galleries, New York.

In 1929 he acquired at auction the Mughal album of calligraphy and painting that became known as the Kevorkian Album, now renamed the Shah Jahan Album by the Metropolitan Museum of Art (rather confusingly, as there is at least one other album called this). The Metropolitan Museum of Art in New York and the Freer Gallery in Washington, D.C. now hold elements of the Kevorkian Album in their collections. An auction of some of his collection occurred in 1970 at the Parke-Bernet Galleries.

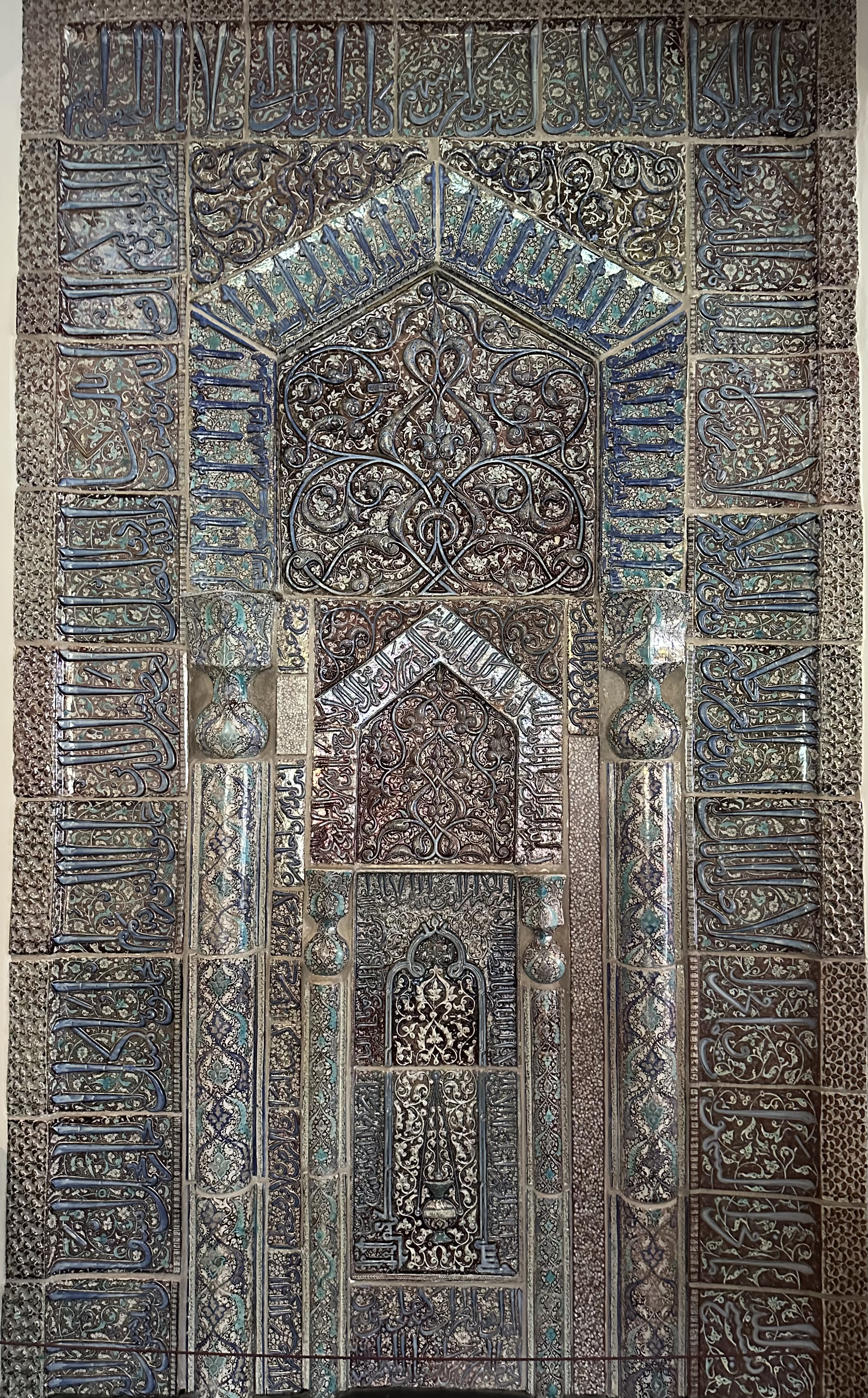
The luster mihrab of the Imamzadeh Yahya in Varamin. Purchased by Kevorkian from Mostowfi ol-Mamalek and sold to Doris Duke.

In a study of the commodification of Islamic antiques and their entry into museum collections, Mercedes Volait identified Hagop Kevorkian as one of a set of "renowned Armenian art dealers in Paris" which also included Dikran Khan Kelekian (1868-1951), and Antoine Brimo of Aleppo. She argued that Kevorkian and others shifted the trade in Islamic antiquities from Damascus and Cairo to Paris, London and New York, while enabling the entry of objects into collections at the Metropolitan Museum of Art, the Louvre, the Victoria and Albert Museum, and more.

=== Philanthropy ===
The Brooklyn Museum's Kevorkian Gallery displays the Assyrian reliefs he donated to the institution.

After Kevorkian's death, his foundation established the Kevorkian Chair of Iranian Studies at Columbia University. New York University has a center named after him that houses its Middle Eastern studies department and library. The Hagop Kevorkian Center for Near Eastern Studies at New York University was created in 1966 to foster the interdisciplinary study of the modern and contemporary Middle East and to enhance public understanding of the region.

He was a major benefactor of the University of Pennsylvania Museum of Archaeology and Anthropology. Ninety-nine objects in the Penn Museum collections came from Kevorkian, either through purchase or, later, donation. He established a fund, the Kevorkian Fund, in the 1950s, which funded the expeditions of the University of Pennsylvania to Hasanlu, a site in northwest Iran inhabited from the 6th millennium BC, which Dr. Robert J. Dyson Jr., excavated. After his death the Kevorkian Fund also supported a visiting lectureship in Iranian art and archaeology and an international speaker series at the Penn Museum.
