= Khamsa of Nizami (British Library, Or. 12208) =

Mughal illuminated manuscript

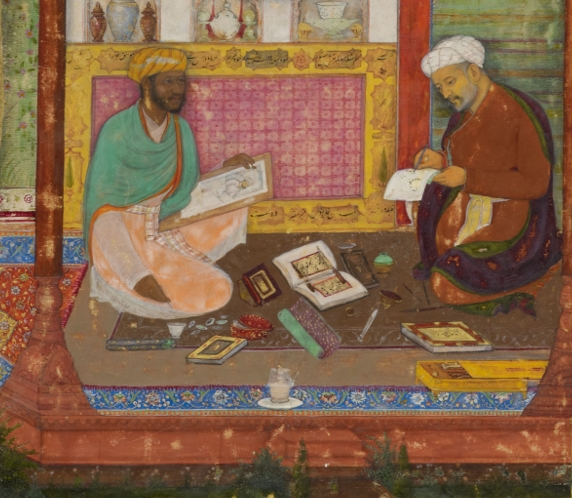
Detail of the added miniature by Daulat showing him (left) painting the calligrapher of the manuscript, Abd al-Rahim

The illuminated manuscript Khamsa of Nizami British Library, Or. 12208 is a lavishly illustrated manuscript of the Khamsa or "five poems" of Nizami Ganjavi, a 12th-century Persian poet, which was created for the Mughal Emperor Akbar in the early 1590s by a number of artists and a single scribe working at the Mughal court, very probably in Akbar's new capital of Lahore in North India, now in Pakistan. Apart from the fine calligraphy of the Persian text, the manuscript is celebrated for over forty Mughal miniatures of the highest quality throughout the text; five of these are detached from the main manuscript and are in the Walters Art Museum, Baltimore as Walters Art Museum MS W.613. The manuscript has been described as "one of the finest examples of the Indo-Muslim arts of the book", and "one of the most perfect of the de luxe type of manuscripts made for Akbar".

== Text ==
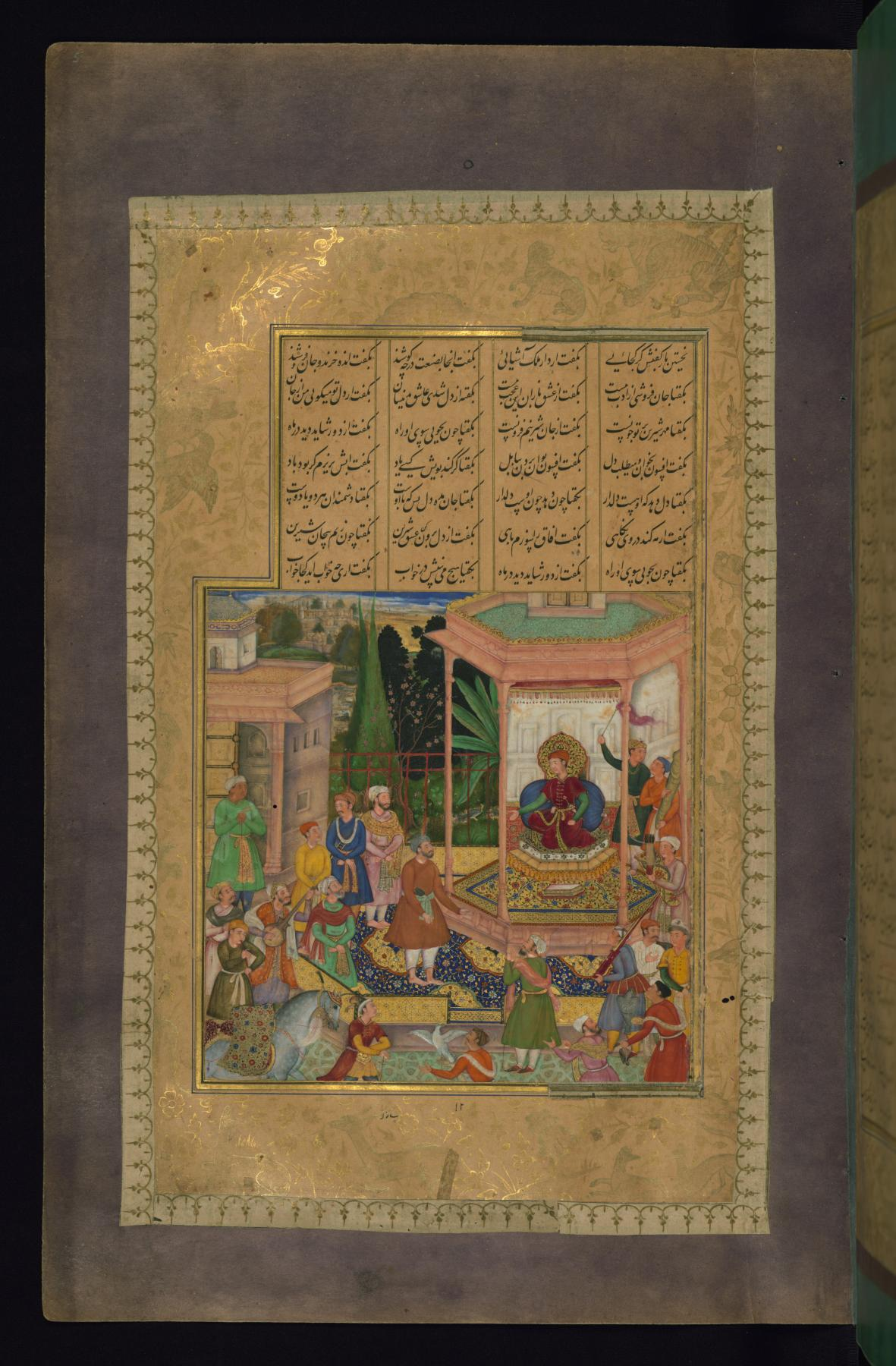
Farhad Before Khusraw, one of the Walters' pages

The collection of five works by Nizami or Nizami is a classic of Persian poetry of which many luxury illuminated manuscript versions have been made; in particular this manuscript should not be confused with British Library, Or. 2265, a Persian manuscript of 1539–43 which is even better known. The poems are in masnavi rhyming couplets. The first poem is a collection of moral discourses illustrated by stories or parables drawn mostly from the lives of historical figures, while the remaining four poems are romances, including many stories found in Persian tradition and earlier works such as the Shahnameh of Ferdowsi. Akbar had already commissioned a smaller manuscript of the Khamsa, which was made in 1585–90.

The text was written by ʻAbd al-Rahīm ʻAnbarīn-qalām, not to be confused with Abdul Rahim Khan-I-Khana, Akbar's minister and translator from Persian, between 12 October 1593 and 14 December 1595, as inscriptions record.

Nizami’s Khamsa contains five poems:

- Makhzan al-Asrar – The Treasury of Mysteries (moral and philosophical poetry)
- Khosrow and Shirin – a romantic epic
- Layla and Majnun – the famous tragic love story
- Haft Paykar – The Seven Beauties
- Eskandar-nameh – about Alexander the Great

== Miniatures ==
The miniatures are attributed by inscriptions to at least twenty artists, most of them apparently Hindus, though the main artist, Khvaja Abd-al Samad, is Muslim. One miniature, of Khusraw hunting, is the latest known work of Abd al-Samad, former head of the imperial workshop and one of the artists Humayun had brought from Persia some forty-five years earlier, at the start of the Mughal tradition. The single scribe was Abd al-Rahim ('Abd al-Rahim 'Ambarin Qalam), a leading calligrapher of the day. Unusually, when the manuscript was inherited by Akbar's son Jahangir, an extra miniature was added by order of the new emperor with a double portrait showing the scribe at work facing Dawlat, the artist of the new miniature, making a drawing of him. This is dated, with an illegible last digit, between 1611 and 1620. Some miniatures are the work of more than one artist, typically dividing the work between drawing the overall composition, colouring and faces. This had been a common method in the imperial workshop, but was giving way to having miniatures all painted by a single artist, as the Mughal style became increasingly concerned with fine detail and realistic depiction.

Apart from their main origin in the tradition of Persian miniature painting, the style of the miniatures reflects Indian art and the Western art that was known in Akbar's court from contacts which included material brought by Jesuit missionaries. While the landscapes often show European influence, and indeed north European characteristics, the many animals depicted mostly ignore the mythical beasts often seen in Persian painting, and emphasize species native to India, depicted with considerable naturalism.

The choice and emphasis of the miniatures has certain distinctive features; the selection of subjects was probably made by the royal librarian and approved by the emperor, or possibly the emperor himself, possibly also in consultation with some of the artists. One of the colophons, unusually, mentions that the book was "commissioned for the treasury of books and august library, servants of his majesty...". The emphasis on the duties, difficulties and splendour of kingship is to be expected in a royal commission, but another recurring theme, of the difficulties of relationships between fathers and sons, is much more individual to this book (miniatures 5, 14, 16, 18, 20). There is a particular interest in visual art; apart from the unusual added portrait of the scribe and a painter, both Western-style art works and Hindu sculptures are depicted (miniatures, 25, 36, 44). Events in the stories are probably also intended to refer to victories of Akbar, and his generosity to the conquered.

== Description ==
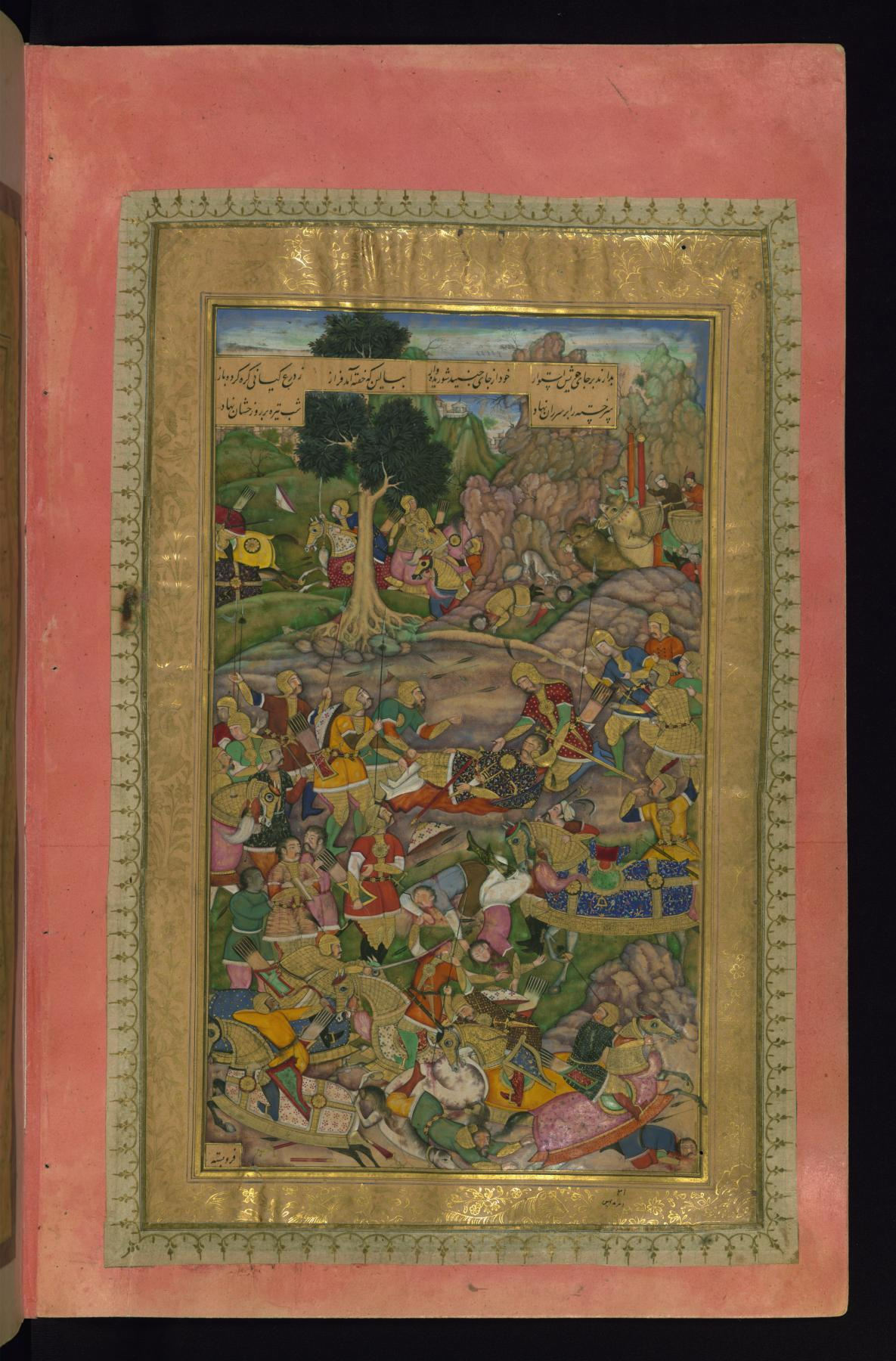
The Death of Darius, by Dharm Das, another Walters page

The manuscript in London has 325 folios of "light-brown polished paper" with a page size of 302 x 198 mm. On text pages the nastaliq script is in four columns of 21 lines. There is also some text on most of the miniature pages, inside the rectangular frame in compartments of varying size, shape and placing. The miniatures have somewhat variable rectangular frames of plain lines and bands of colour, outside which there are generous borders filled with very high quality gold grisaille decoration of plants, birds and animals, with some rocks and other landscape elements. Outside this are further plain frames, with a final zone of simple pen decoration which is probably recent as the form is different between the pages in London and those in Baltimore.

The main London portion of the manuscript has 36 full-page figurative miniatures, one a double page spread. Baltimore has four miniatures, also including one double page subject (so five pages). Two further miniatures (or one double one) are missing, as shown by a small and apparently early system of numbering the miniatures. The manuscript therefore originally had 42 pages of miniatures, counting double pages as two. Some miniatures are out of their natural sequence, but the numbering suggests the manuscript was made in this way. Apart from the figurative miniatures, there are a number of pages with decorative panels of abstract motifs, plants and animals, especially at the beginning and end of sections of the work. The original painted and lacquered book covers each (front and back) have one side with a gold and brown scene of animals attacking other animals in a landscape and on the other side a scene with muted colour, one of a hunt and the other of an enthroned ruler, no doubt Akbar, being presented with the catch of game. All four scenes are enclosed in a frame with two borders of elaborate decoration, which like much of the abstract decorative work is similar in style to Persian, or Mughal, carpet decoration.

== History ==
The history of the manuscript is unknown after its ownership by Jahangir; the Mughal library amounted to some 24,000 manuscripts at its height, though many were taken by the Iranian Nadir Shah when he overran much of the Mughal empire in the 18th century. The known history resumes in 1909, when the London portion was bought by the collector C. W. Dyson Perrins (of the Worcestershire sauce family), who bequeathed it to the British Museum at his death in 1958. It came to the British Library when it inherited the British Museum libraries on its foundation in 1973. The Baltimore leaves had already been separated before 1909. In 2013 pages from the manuscript were exhibited in the British Library's exhibition Mughal India: Art, Culture and Empire.

== Gallery (Walters Art Museum) ==
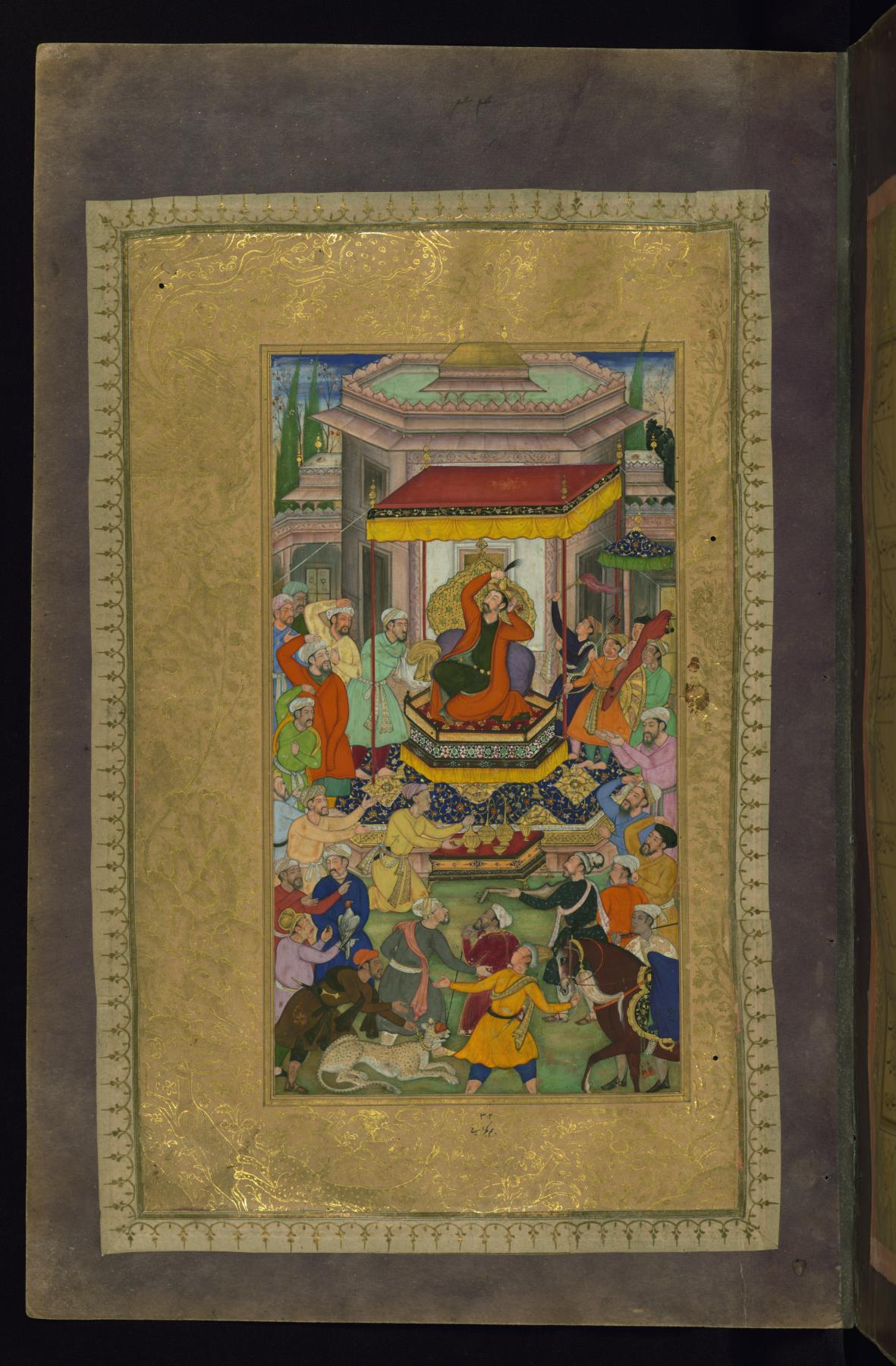
Bim Gujarati, Alexander the Great Enthroned at Persepolis

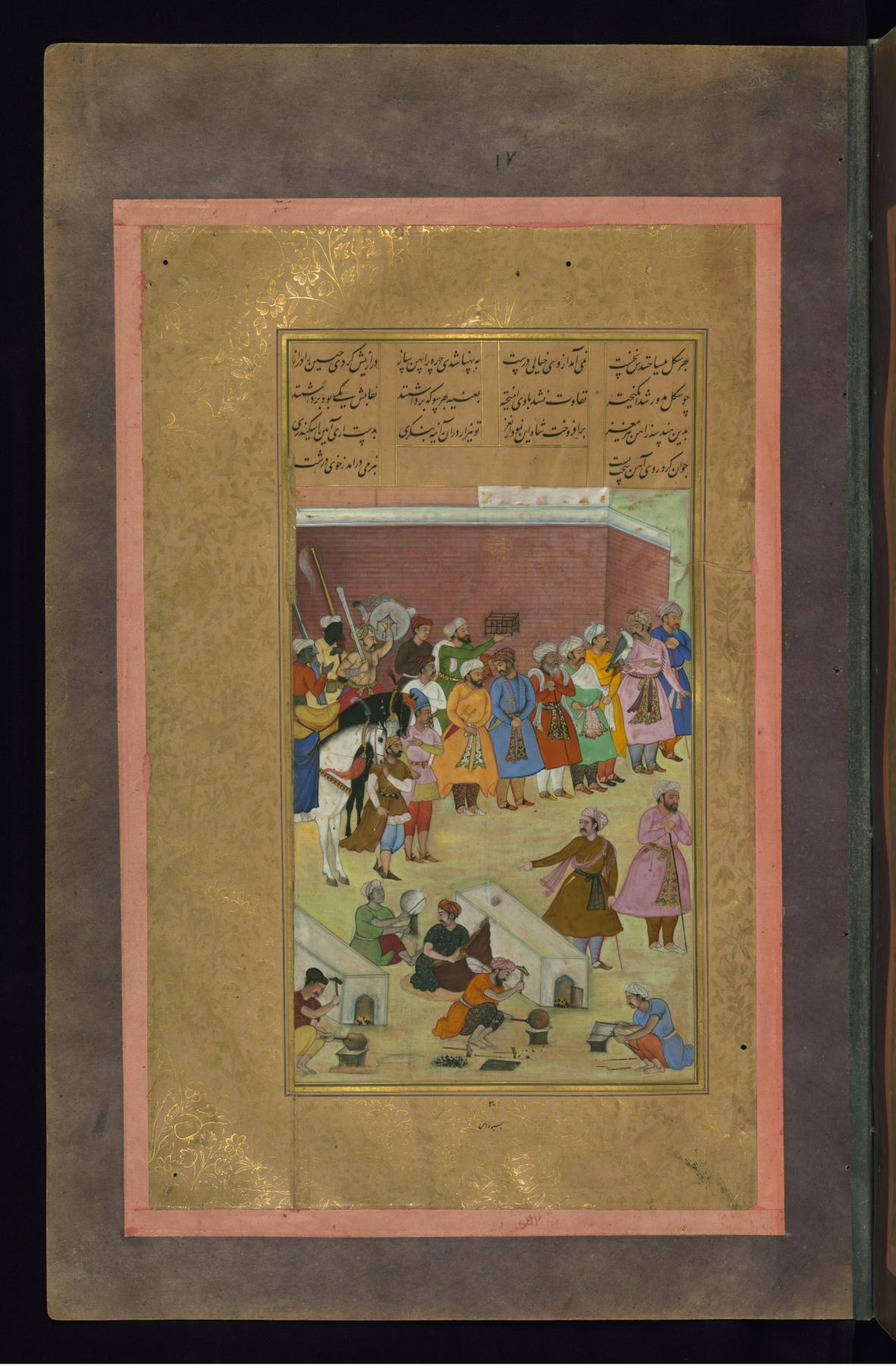
'Abd al-Rahim 'Ambarin Qalam, Invention of the Mirror in the Presence of Alexander the Great, left side of a double spread

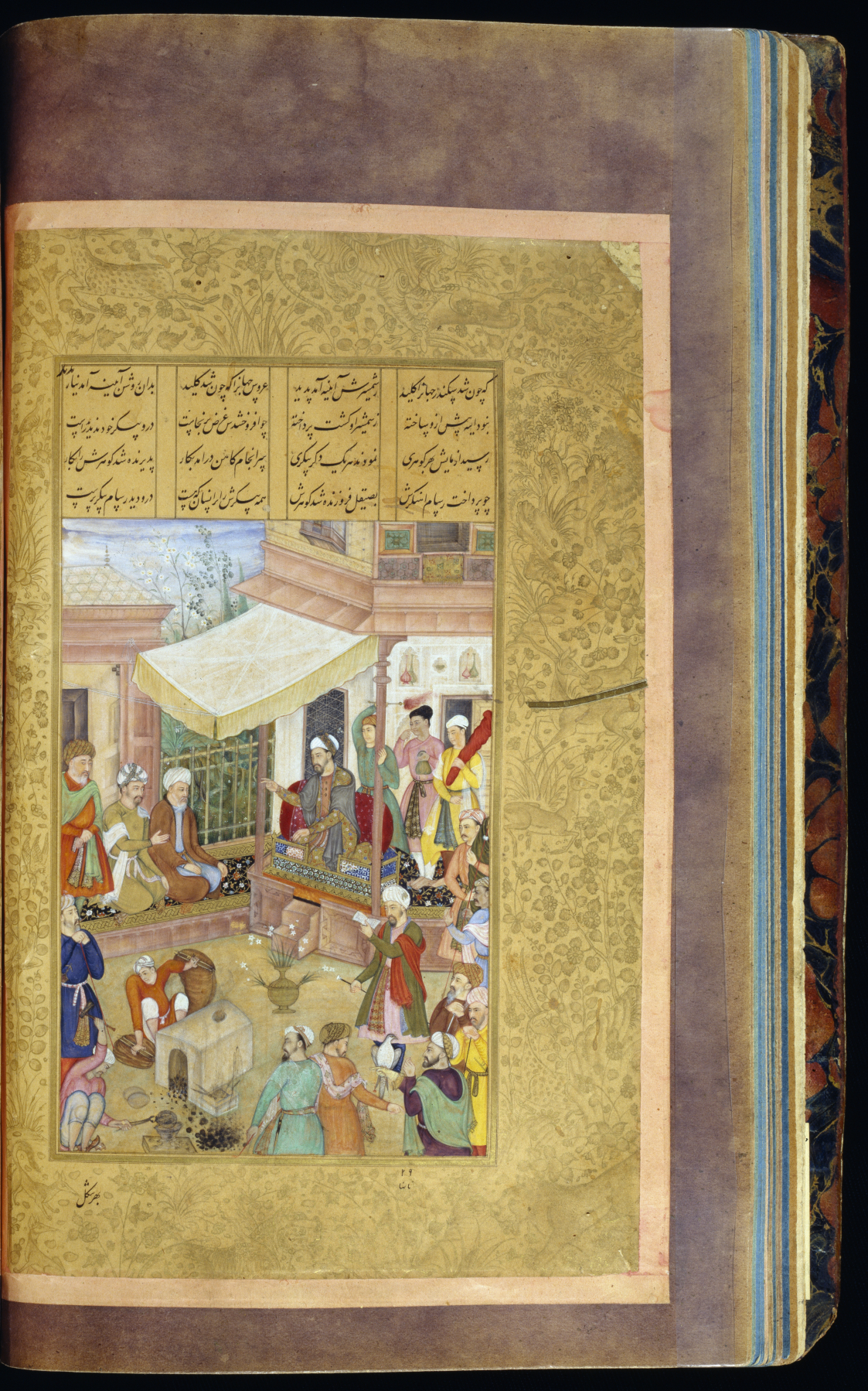
'Abd al-Rahim 'Ambarin Qalam, Invention of the Mirror in the Presence of Alexander the Great, right side of a double spread

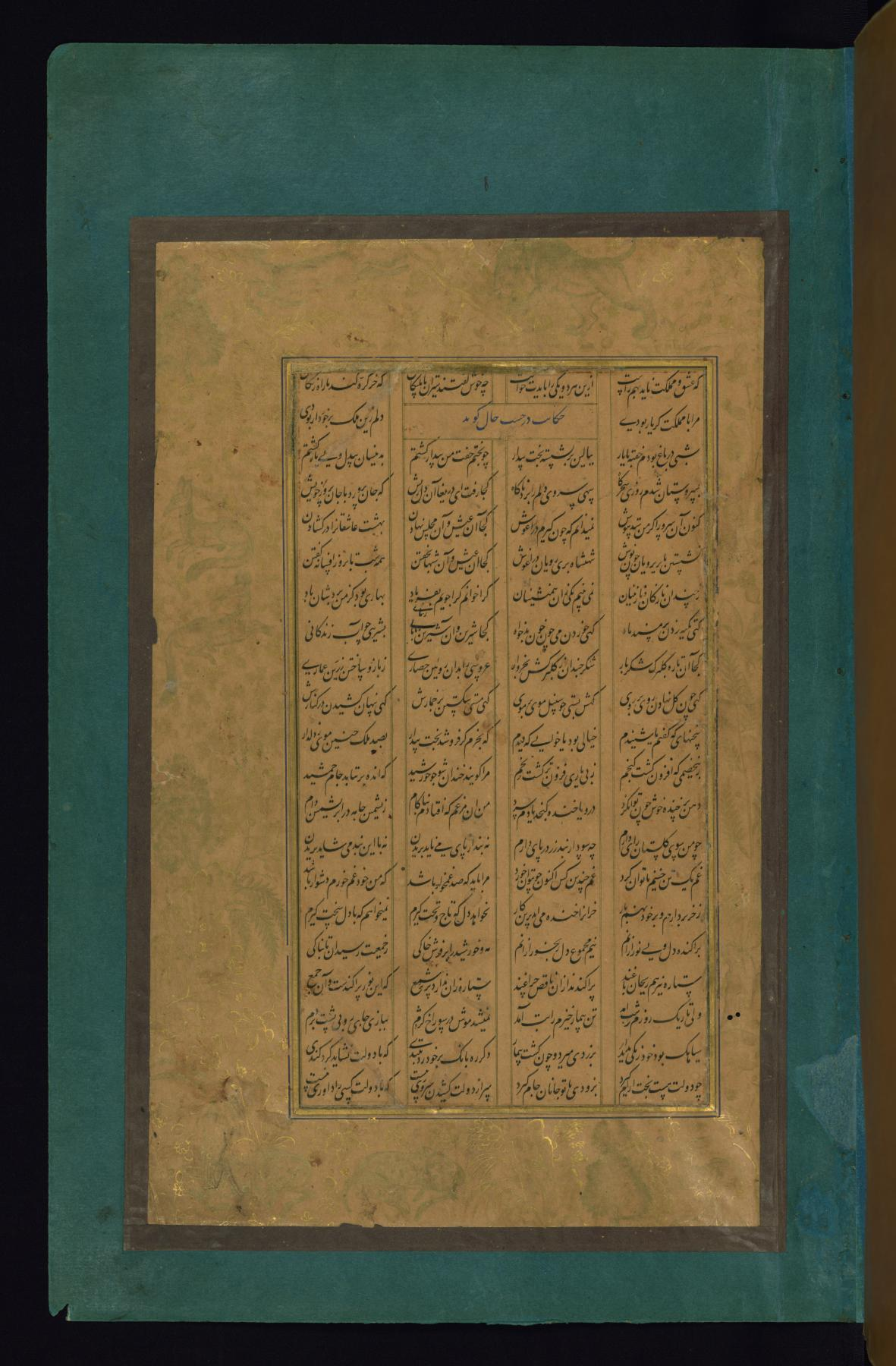
'Abd al-Rahim 'Ambarin Qalam, Text page, Walters W613 1A
