= Manohar Das =

Master painter in the Mughal emperor's court

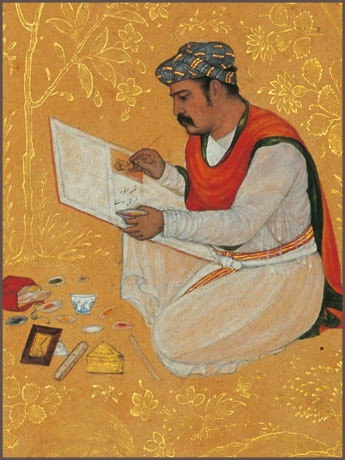
- Portrait of Manohar found on the border of a folio of the Gulshan Album, by Daulat, ca.1610
- Style: Mughal
- Patrons: Akbar and Jahangir

Manohar Das, also Manohar or Manuhar, (fl. 1582–1624) was an Indian Hindu painter in the Mughal style.

Manohar's father Basawan was a master painter in the Mughal emperor's court, where Manohar grew up. His father most likely instructed him, and later Manohar became a court painter as well. His earliest works were painted for Akbar, and then later he was in the service of Akbar's son and successor Jahangir. Manohar's works frequently depicted the royal families and life at court. Some of his works can be found at the British Museum and the Victoria and Albert Museum.

== Gallery ==
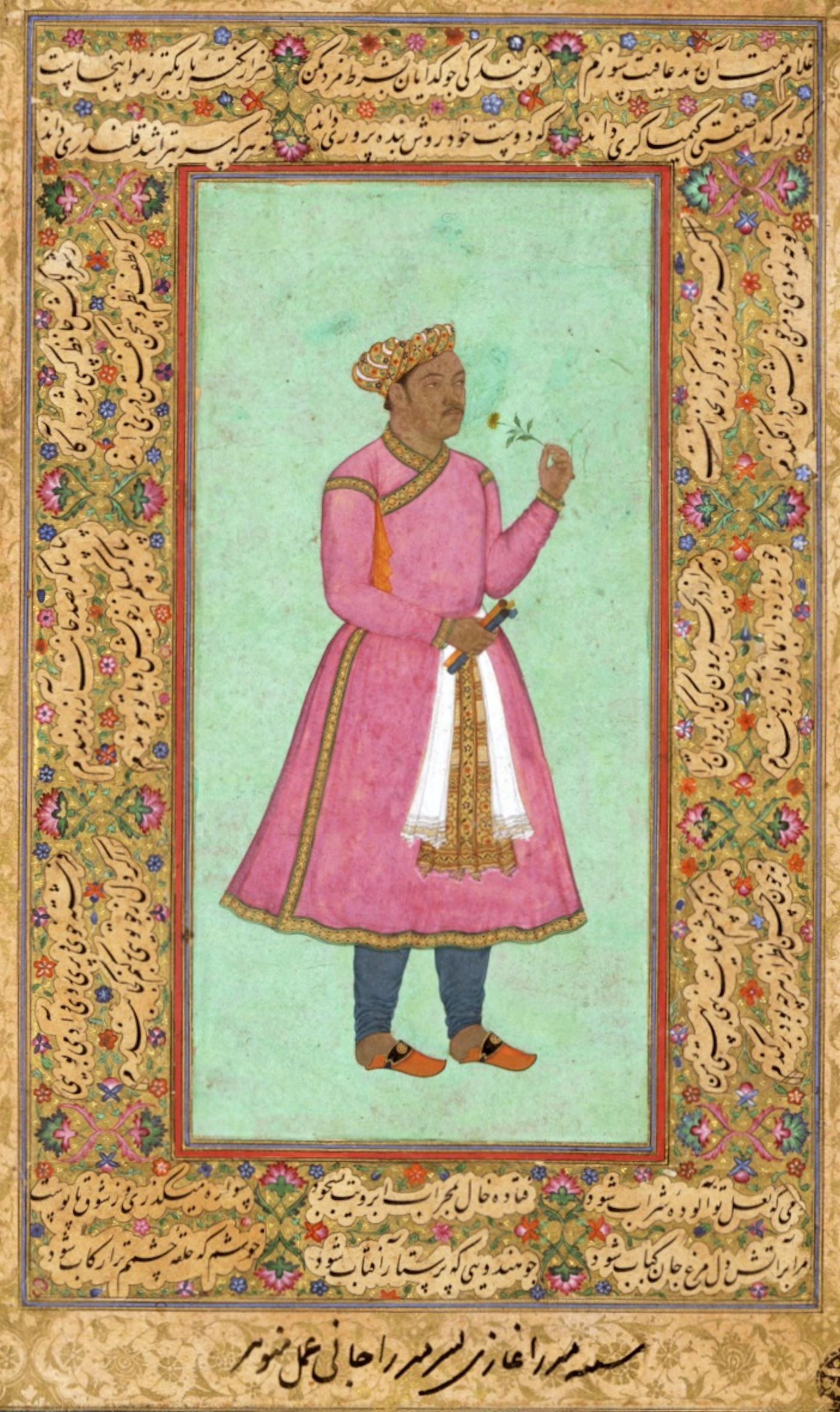
"Likeness of Mirza Ghazi, son of Mirza Jani". Made by Manohar, a Mughal painter at the Tarkhan Court in the province of Thatta, circa 1610.

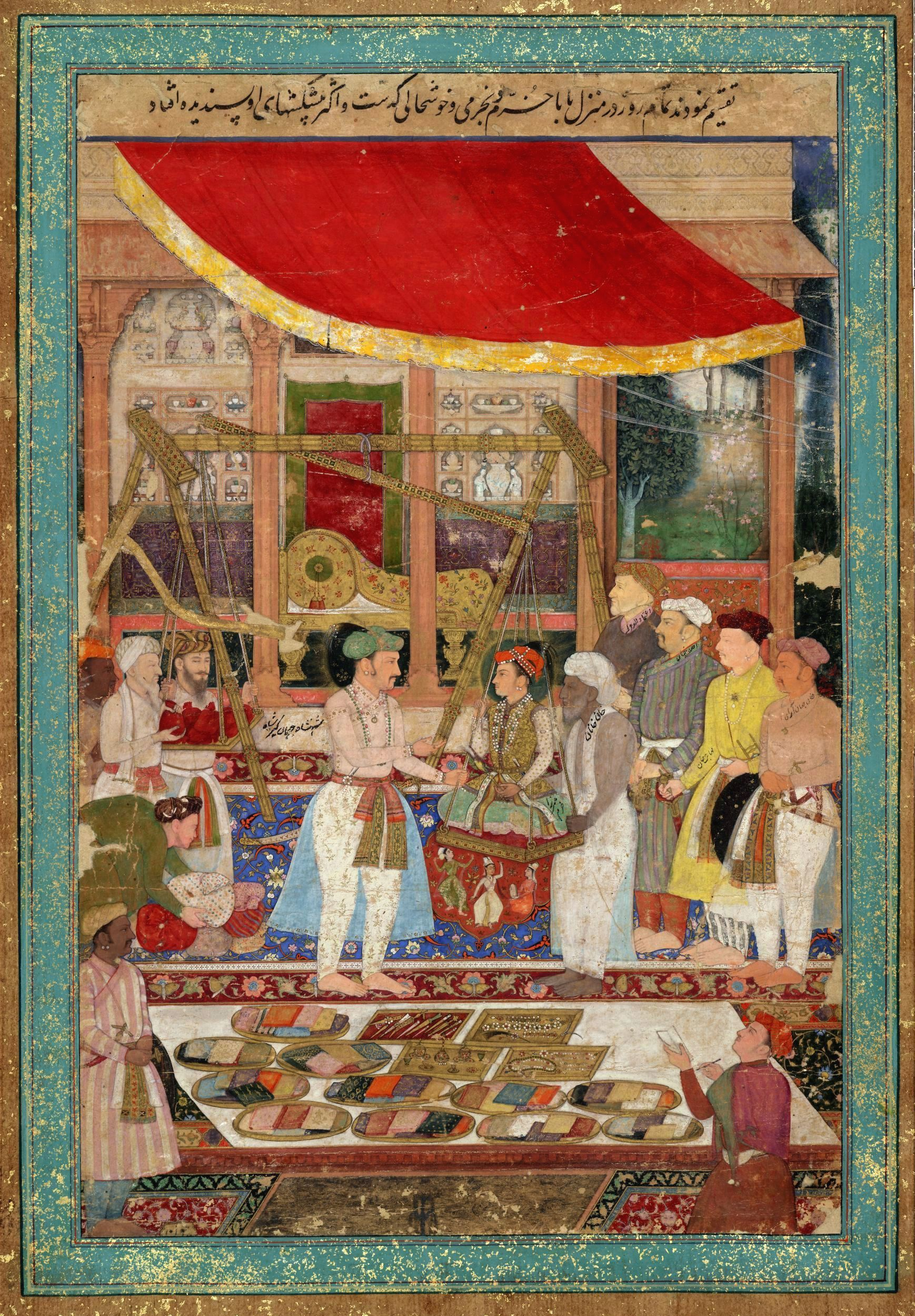
Emperor Jahangir weighs Prince Khurram by Manohar Das, British Museum, 1610–1615. There seems to be a self-portrait at bottom right.
