= Nanha (painter) =

Indian painter, active 1582–1635

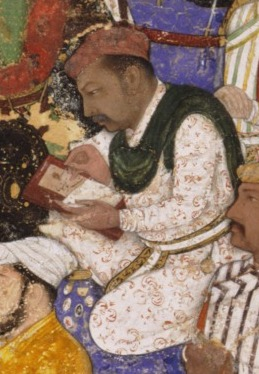
Self-portrait (detail; see below)

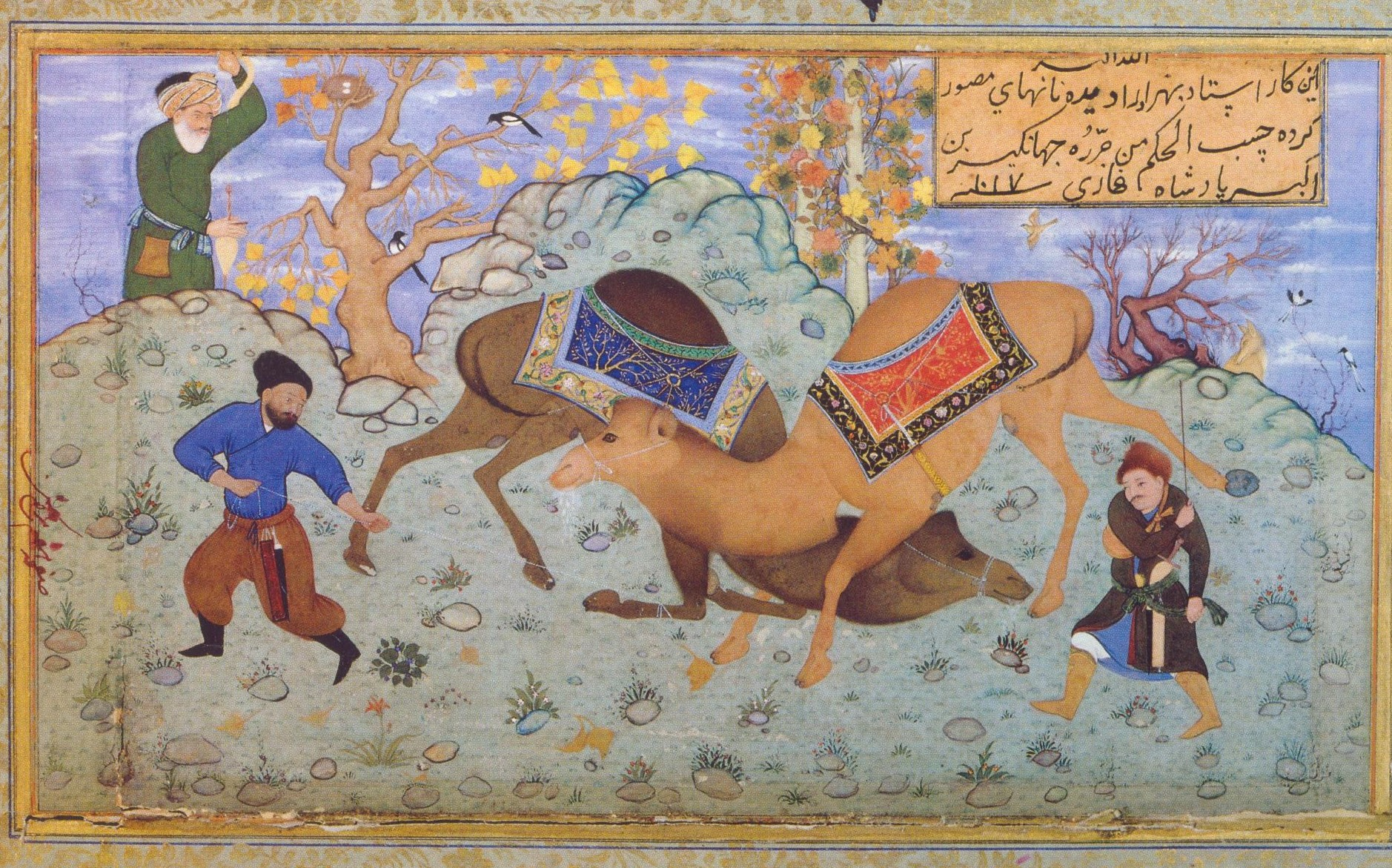
Camel fight, a copy by Nanha of a work by Bihzad. Muraqqa-e Gulshan (Gulistan Palace Library, Tehran).

Nanha (Persian: نانها, Nānhā; fl. c. 1582–1635), also called Nanah or Nana, was an Indian painter and illuminator of the Mughal era, active during the reigns of emperors Akbar the Great, Jahangir and Shah Jahan.

== Selected works ==
- Illustrations in a MS. of the Dārābz-nāma ('Story of Darab'), c. 1580 (London, BL, Or. MS. 4615);
- Illustrations in a MS. of the Razm-nāma ('Books of war'), 1582–6 (Jaipur, Maharaja Sawai Man Singh II Museum, MS. AG. 1683–1850);
- Illustrations for a translation of the Mahābhārata commissioned by Akbar;
- Illustrations in a MS. of the Tārīkh-i Khāndān-i Tīmūriyya ('History of the house of Timur'), c. 1584 (Bankipur, Patna, Khuda Bakhsh Oriental Library);
- Illustrations, including portraits, in the Victoria and Albert Akbarnama ('History of Akbar'), c. 1590 (London, Victoria & Albert Museum, MS. IS. 2–1896);
- One painting (attributed) in Akbar's copy of the Dīvān ('collected poems') of Anvari, 1588 (Cambridge, MA, Sackler Museum, MS. 1960.117.15)
- Four illustrations in a MS. of the Khamsa ('Five poems') of Nizami, 1595 (London, BL, Or. MS. 12208, fols 63v, 159r, and 305v)
- Signed work (Baltimore, MD, Walters Art Museum, MS. W.613, fol. 16v);
- Painting in a MS. of the Jahāngīr-nāma ('History of Jahangir'), c. 1618 (London, Victoria & Albert Museum, MS. IS. 185–1984), includes a self-portrait (shown above right);
- Portrait of Zulfiqar Khan in the Minto Album, c. 1635 (London, Victoria & Albert Museum);
- Portrait of Sayf Khan Barha (New York, Metropolitan Museum of Art, 55.121.10.4v);
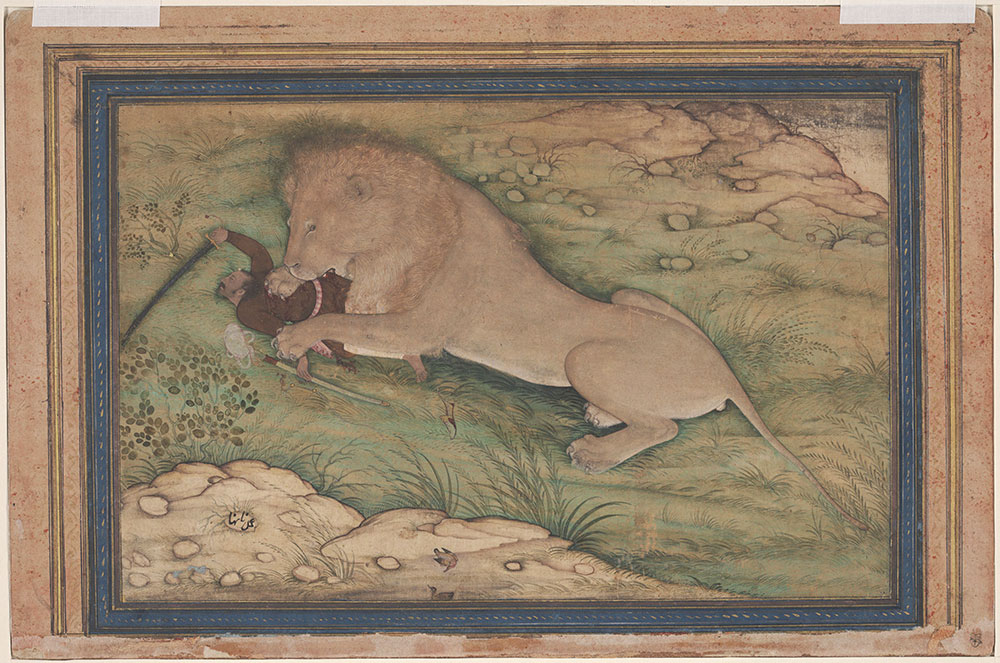
- "Lion Attacking a Hunter", by Nanha. Free Library of Philadelphia
  Perils of the Hunt (Free Library of Philadelphia), painted atypically on silk, exemplifies Nanha's penchant for ravening lions.

== See also ==
- Mughal painting
- Muraqqa

== Sources ==
- Beach, Milo Cleveland (1978). The Grand Mogul: Imperial Painting in India, 1600–1660. United States of America: Sterling and Francine Clark Art Institute. pp. 34, 64, 74, 76, 93, 108, 109, 140, 147ff, 150–51.
- Bloom, J.; Blair, S., eds. (2009). "Nanha [Nānhā]". The Grove Encyclopedia of Islamic Art and Architecture (online ed.). Oxford University Press.
- Kember, P., ed. (2012). "Nanha". Benezit Dictionary of Asian Artists (online ed.). Oxford University Press.
- Seyller, J. (2003). "Nanha [Nānhā]". Grove Art Online (online ed.). Oxford Art Online. doi:10.1093/gao/9781884446054.article.T060862. ISBN 978-1-884446-05-4.
- "Nanha or Nanah or Nana". Benezit Dictionary of Artists. Oxford Art Online. 31 October 2011. doi:10.1093/benz/9780199773787.article.B00128620. ISBN 978-0-19-977378-7.
