= Daulat (artist) =

Mughal painter

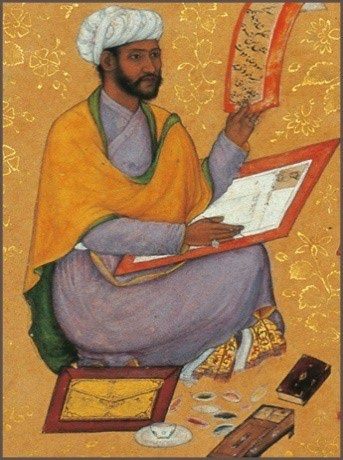
- Self-portrait of Daulat found on the border of a folio of the Gulshan Album, ca.1610
- Style: Mughal
- Patrons: Akbar, Jahangir, and Shah Jahan

Muhammad Daulat (or Dawlat) was a leading artist in Mughal painting, active on imperial commissions between about 1595 and 1635–1640, during the reigns of Akbar, Jahangir, and Shah Jahan. He began his career painting large narrative scenes, then specialized in portraits, but later in his career seems to have specialized in highly ornate borders to miniatures.

== Life and career ==
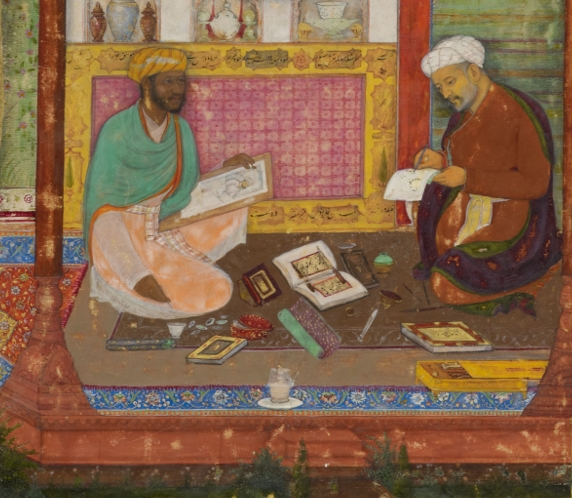
Detail of the colophon miniature added to the Khamsa of Nizami (British Library, Or. 12208) by Daulat, showing him (left) painting the calligrapher of the manuscript, Abd al-Rahim.

His father, L'al, served in the imperial court, very likely as one of the many artists in the imperial workshop. Daulat trained there and was active as a painter by the mid-1590s, remaining for the whole of his career. His brother Daud (Da'ud) was also an artist, who is usually referred to in inscriptions and art history as "Daud, brother of Daulat". Like Govardhan, the other main portrait specialist of the period, and ultimately a finer artist than Daulat, he was influenced by Basawan.

Important manuscript projects he contributed to in the 1590s include the British Library Akbarnama (MS Or. 12988, 3 miniatures), Akbar's dispersed Razmnama, and the Baburnama in New Delhi (4 miniatures). In the next century, he contributed to the Windsor Padshahnama and the Kevorkian Album.

Daulat shows an "unusual self-consciousness" even in his early works. There are two identifiable self-portraits, both made at the emperor's request, as well as portraits of other artist colleagues, and some of his most significant miniatures contain tiny signatures hidden among the detail of the painting, for example on the girdle of a soldier in one Baburnama miniature. One signature reads "Muhammad Daulat, son of L'al", and in another he describes himself as "the least of the houseborn", indicating his father worked in the court. There are other "formulaic expressions of humility" of the type expected in the Mughal court, though Daulat takes these further than most; his inscription on the Gulshan Album page with his self-portrait ends "Written by the lowly, needy, insignificant, Daulat". Sometimes he puns on his name, which means "empire".

== Style ==
Daulat's style has been described as "distinguished by clusters of narrow-shouldered, voluminous figures and a bright palette intensified by pronounced contour shading. His facial types are quite individualized, but share dark features, full cheeks and large, staring eyes, the latter frequently directed at the viewer."

His double portrait in the Khamsa of Nizami (British Library, Or. 12208) was added to the book many years later, at the specific request of Jahangir, a signal honour. The text is dated AH 1004 (1595–1596 AD) and the main narrative miniatures come from the same period, while the added colophon miniature probably dates to 1609–1610. Daulat does not seem to have contributed to the original miniatures, although some are now missing. The portrait of the calligrapher is probably posthumous, although Daulat would have known him when alive. This page followed some other Mughal manuscripts in giving a pictorial colophon which showed a pair of men in the imperial book workshop working at their specialisms, calligraphy, drawing or painting, and in one case preparing a sheet of paper by polishing it (the usual Mughal practice for luxury manuscript pages).

A page by Daulat in the Gulshan Album, a lavish muraqqa made for Jahangir and now in the Golestan Palace Library, Tehran, has wide gold borders which include seven portraits of court employees, five shown drawing, painting or reading. One is Daulat's self-portrait. Daulat's inscription records that this was also done at the emperor's specific request.

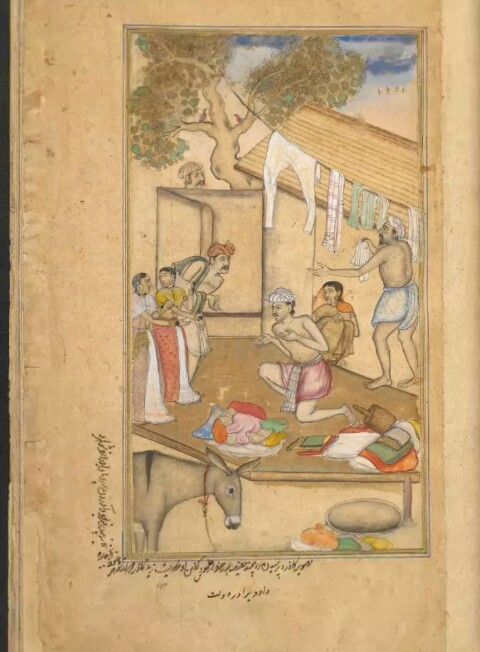
A page inscribed "Daud, brother of Daulat", in the Razmnamah (British Library, Or. 12076), c. 1599

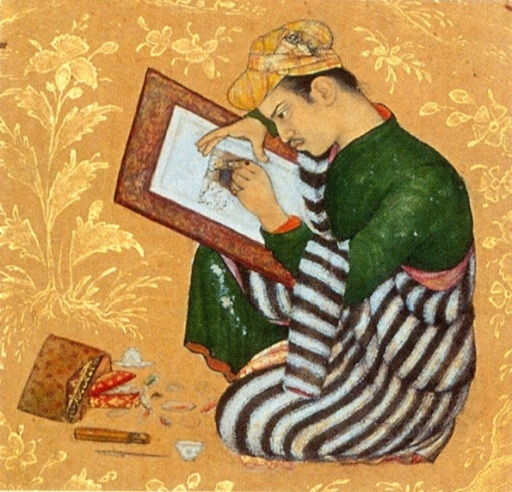
Portrait of Abu'l Hasan, from the Gulshan Album, c. 1610, Golestan Palace Library, Tehran

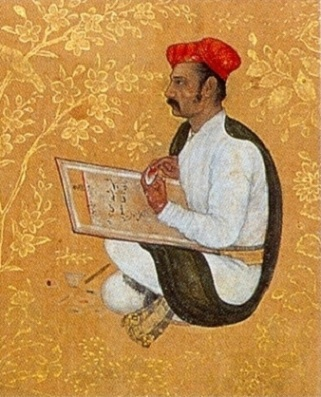
Portrait of Bishandas, c. 1610, from the same page

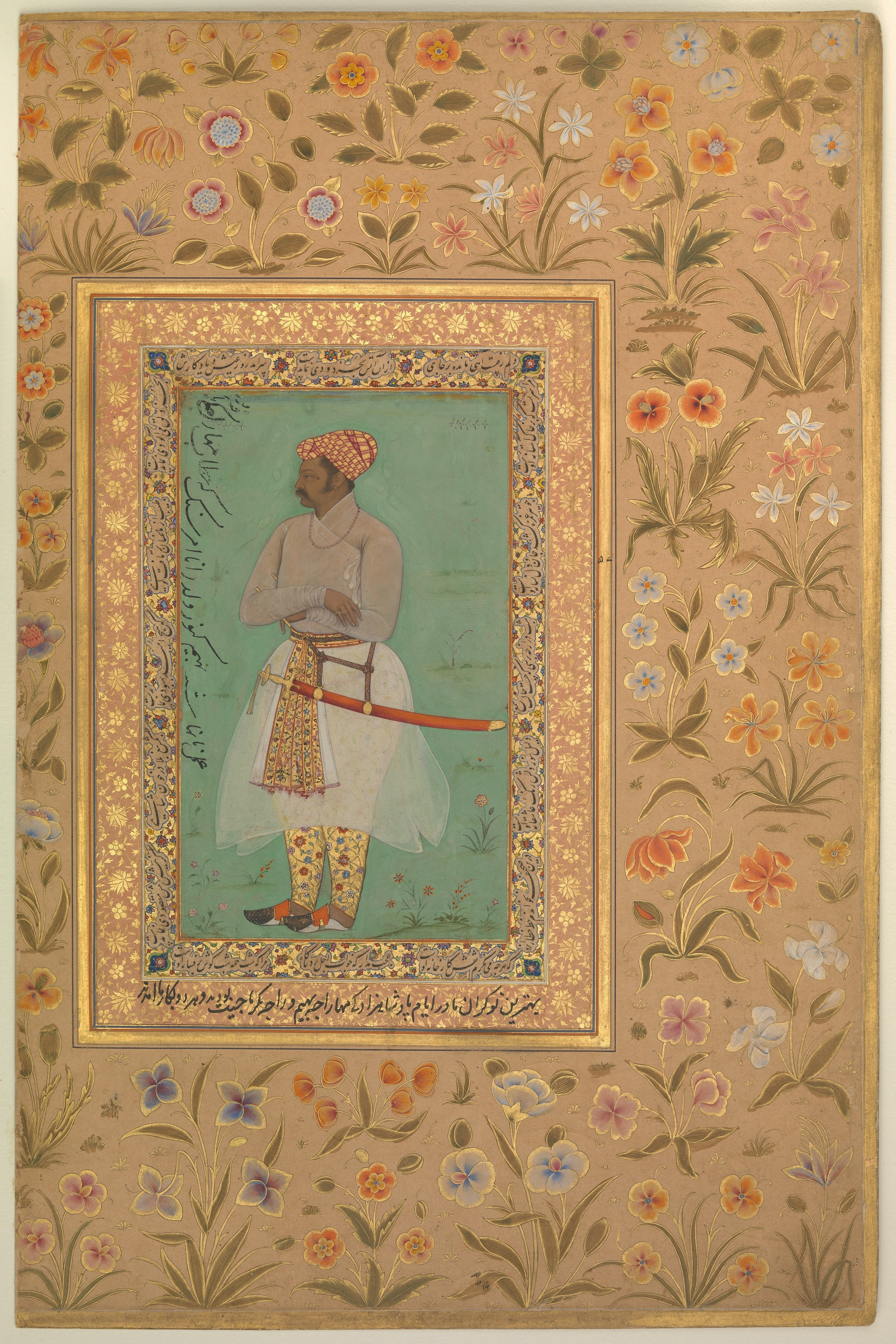
Border by Daulat to a portrait by Nanha of Maharaja Bhim Kanwar, son of Amar Singh I of Mewar, from the Kevorkian Album, a muraqqa (album), c. 1615–1629. Border signed "the work of the slave of the threshold Daulat"
