= Govardhan (artist) =

17th century Indian painter

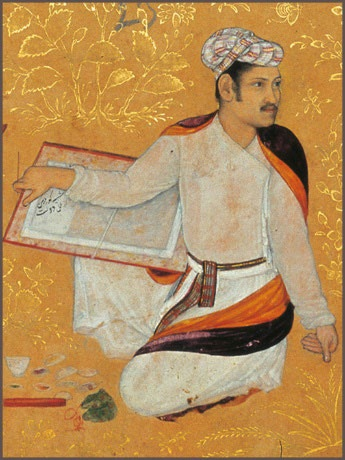
- Portrait of Govardhan found on the border of a folio of the Gulshan Album, by Daulat, c. 1610
- Style: Mughal
- Patron(s): Akbar and Shah Jahan

Govardhan (fl. 1595–1640) was a Mughal era Indian painter of the Mughal school of painting. His father Bhavani Das, had been a minor painter in the imperial workshop. Like many other Mughal painters, they were Hindus. He joined the imperial service during the reign of Akbar and he continued his work till the reign of Shah Jahan. The examples of his work that are still extant show that he was fond of rich, sensuous colour and softly modelled forms.

Govardhan was one of the illustrators of the Baburnama currently located in the British Museum, London. The Jahangir celebrating the festival of Ab-Pashi (1615), presently kept in the Raza Library in Rampur, India is one of his significant creations. His portraits contained in the Jahangir albums are presently in the collections of various American and European museums. He depicted the different human physiques of the Indians with much accuracy. An excellent portrait of him was prepared by one of his contemporary painters, Daulat.

== Gallery ==
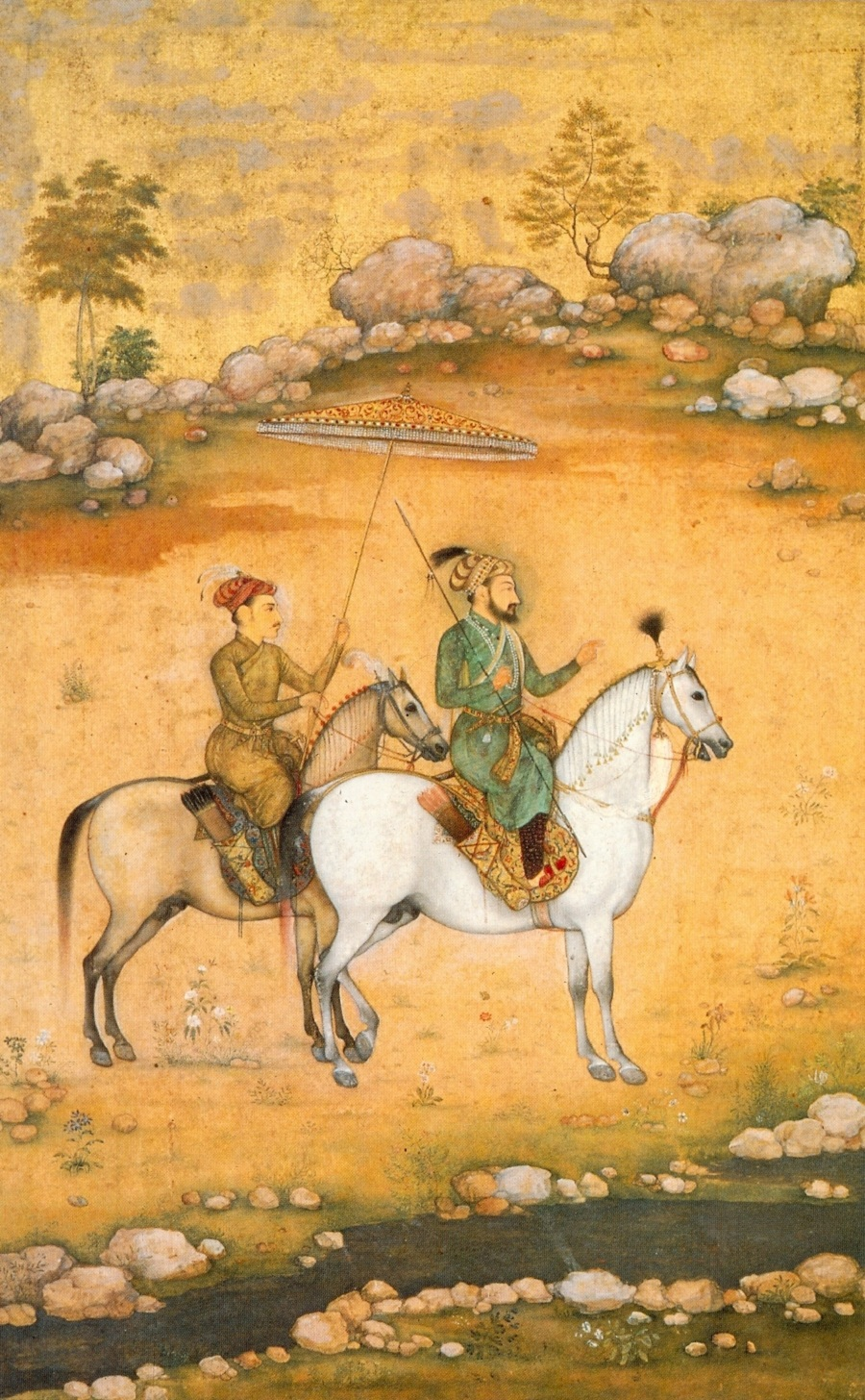
Govardhan. Shah Jahan and Dara Shikoh c. 1638. Victoria and Albert Museum.

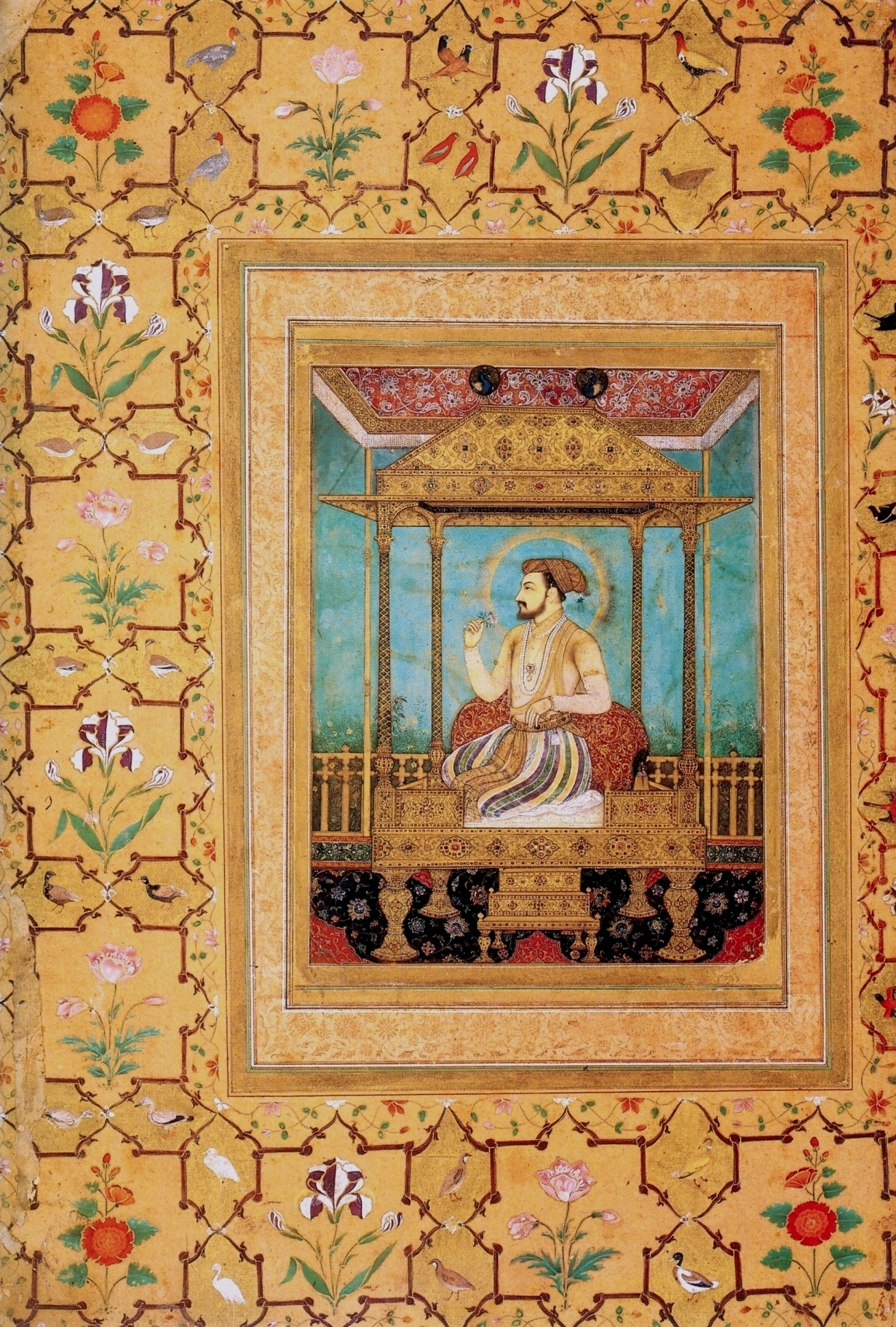
Shah Jahan on The Peacock Throne, c. 1635. Museum of Islamic Art, Doha

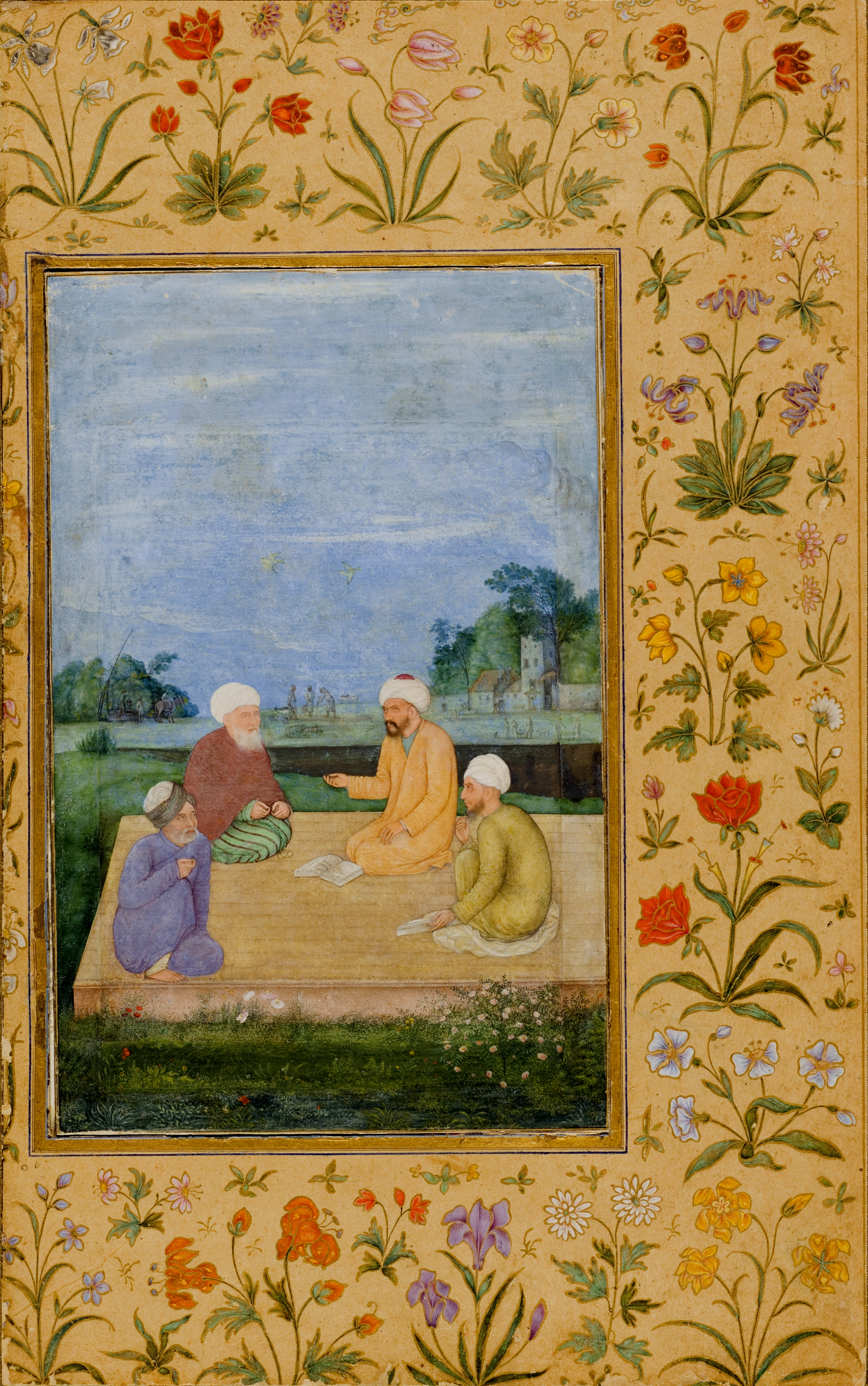
Govardhan. A Discourse between Muslim Sages c. 1630 Los Angeles County Museum of Art.

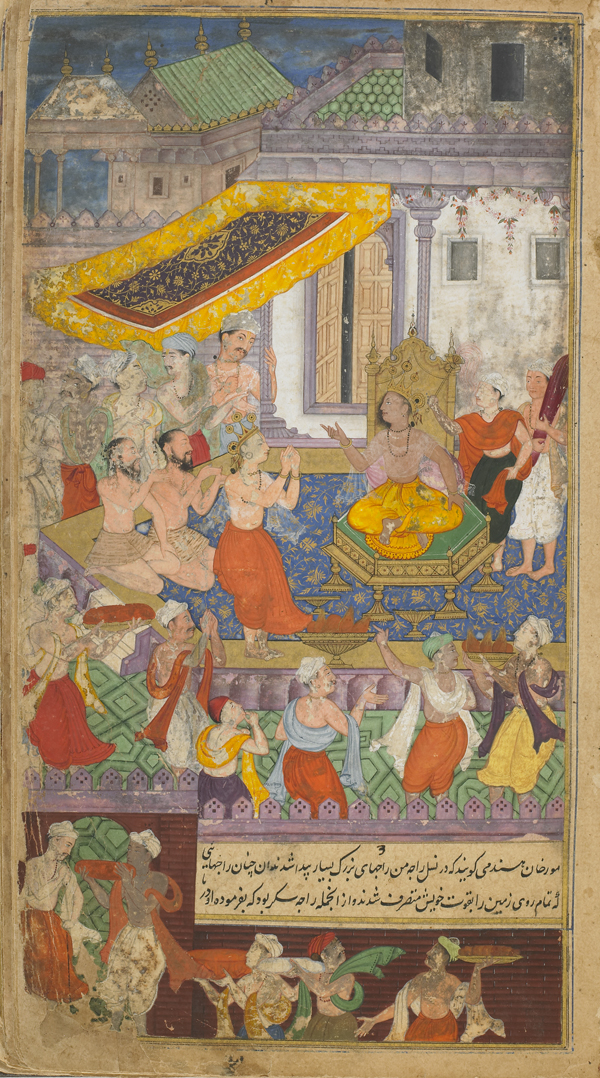
Folio from the Ramayana of Valmiki (The Freer Ramayana), 1597–1605

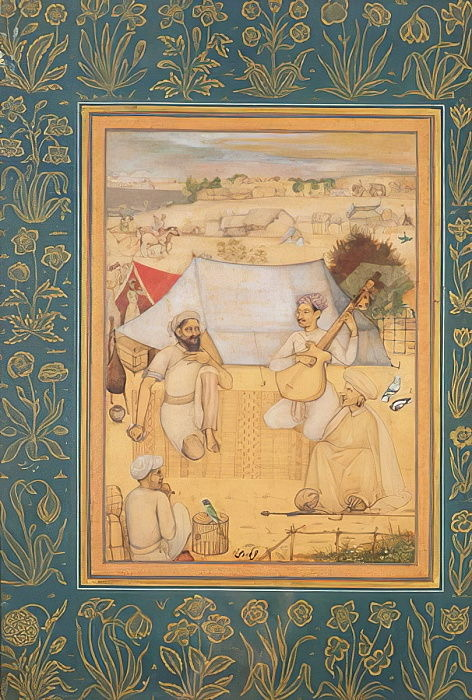
1630. A musician and singer kneel on the edge of a Mughal camp. A yogi and a servant listen to them. From the Minto Album. The instrument in a Seni rebab.

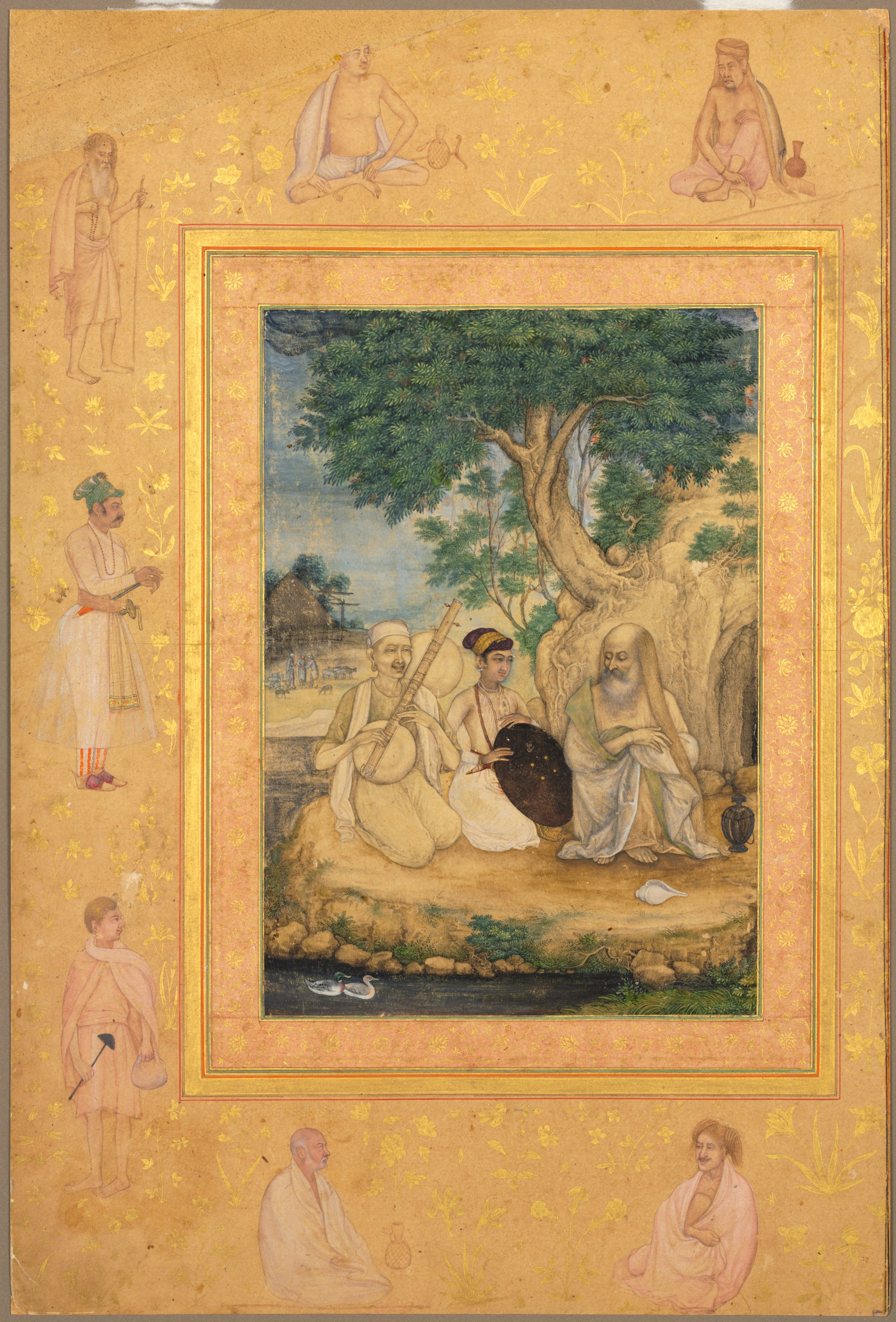
Page from the Late Shah Jahan Album -- Prince and Ascetics c 1630. Instruments are the veena and (possibly) the daf.

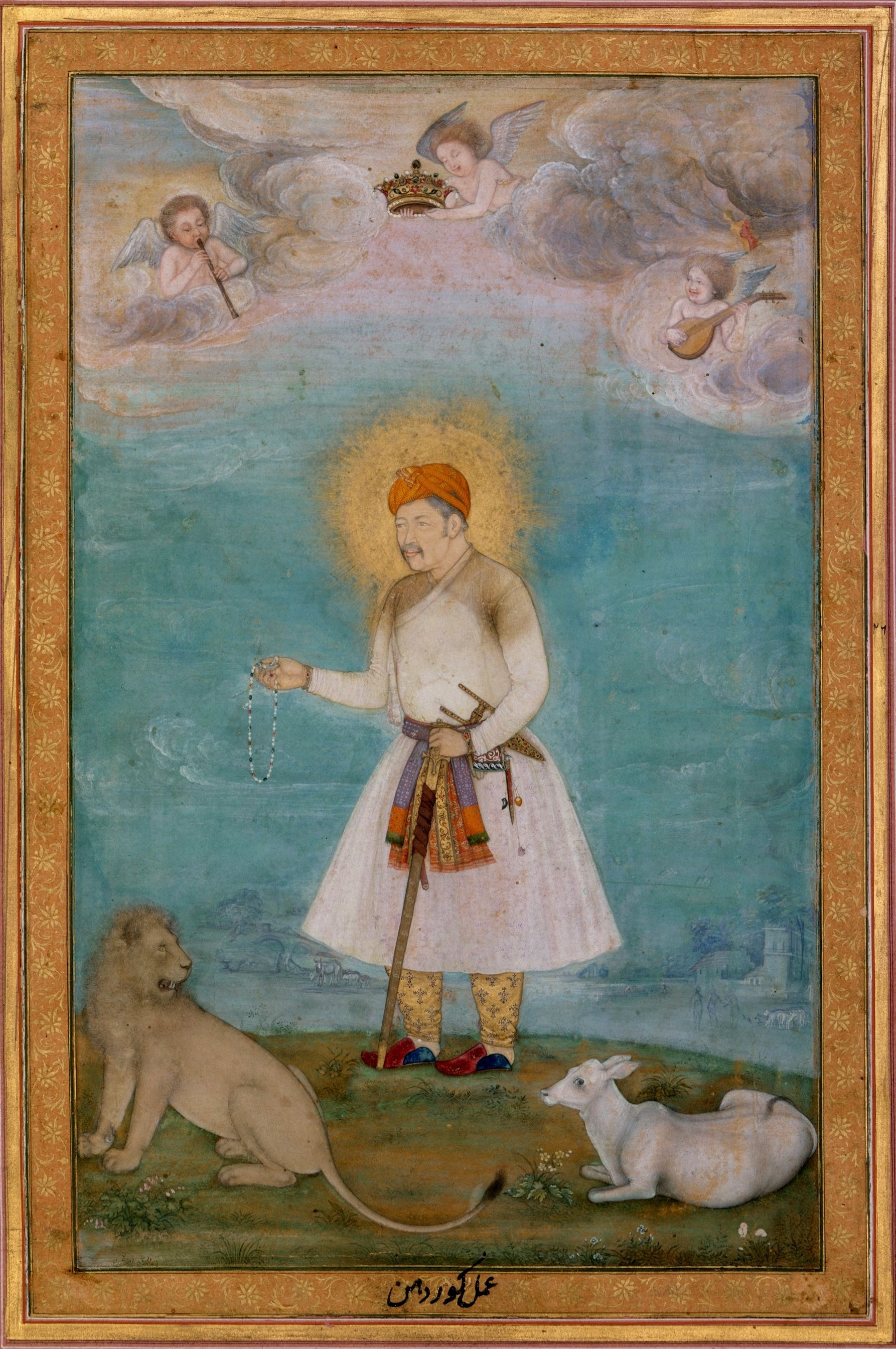
Akbar With Lion and Calf – by Govardhan (c. 1630), at the Metropolitan Museum of Art.

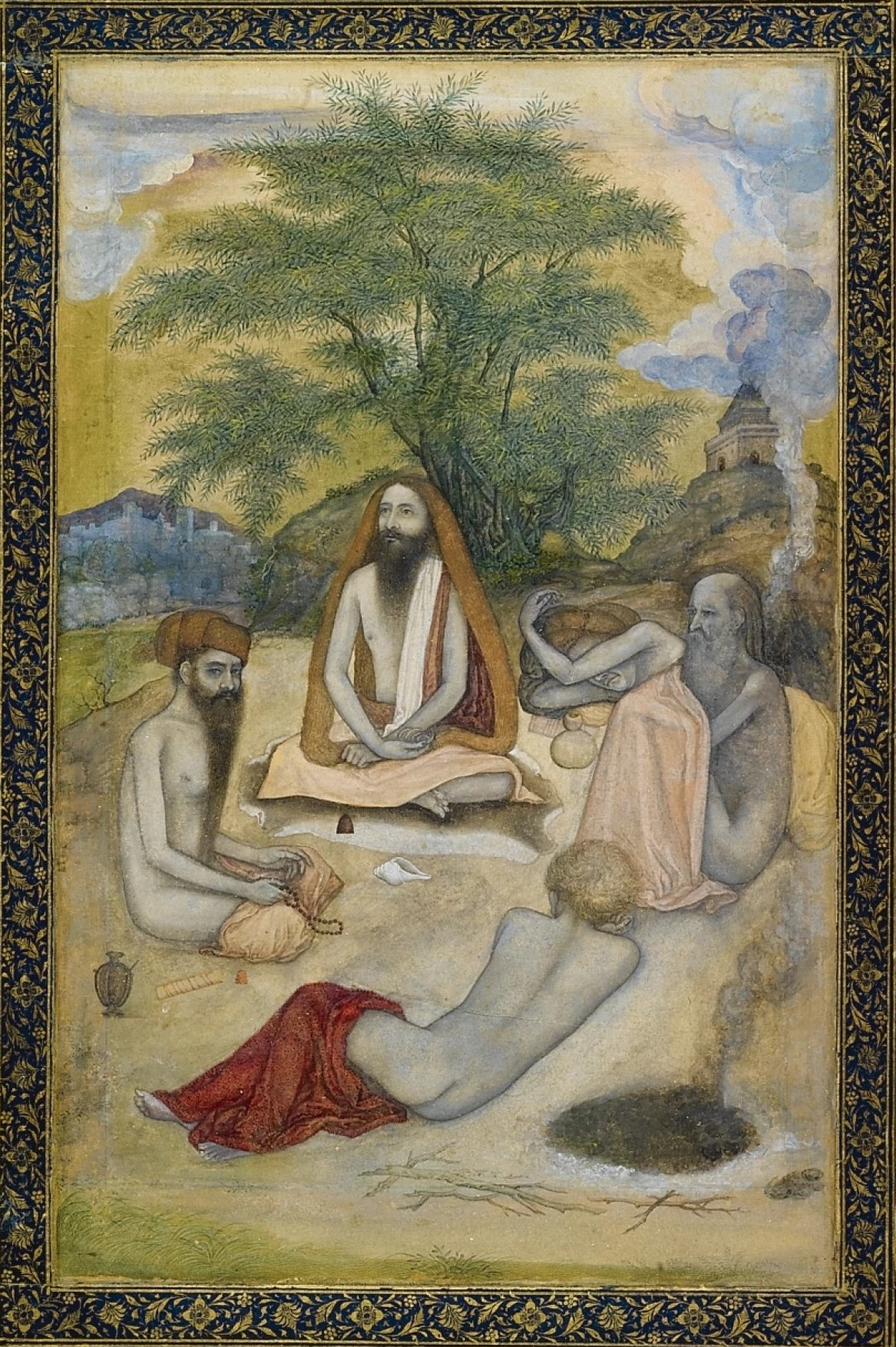
Five Holy Men, A Leaf from the St. Petersburg Album. c. 1625–1630. Private collection.

== Sources ==
- Beach, Milo C. (2020). "Govardhan". In Fleet, Kate; Krämer, Gudrun; Matringe, Denis; Nawas, John; Rowson, Everett (eds.). Encyclopaedia of Islam (3rd ed.). Brill Online. ISSN 1873-9830.
