= Abd al-Samad =

16th-century Persian painter

- Born: Khwaja 'Abd-us-Samad; Shiraz, Iran
- Notable work: Illustration of the Hamzanama; Khamseh of Nizami
- Awards: Master of the Mint (1576); Dewan of Multan (1584)
- Patrons: Humayun; Akbar

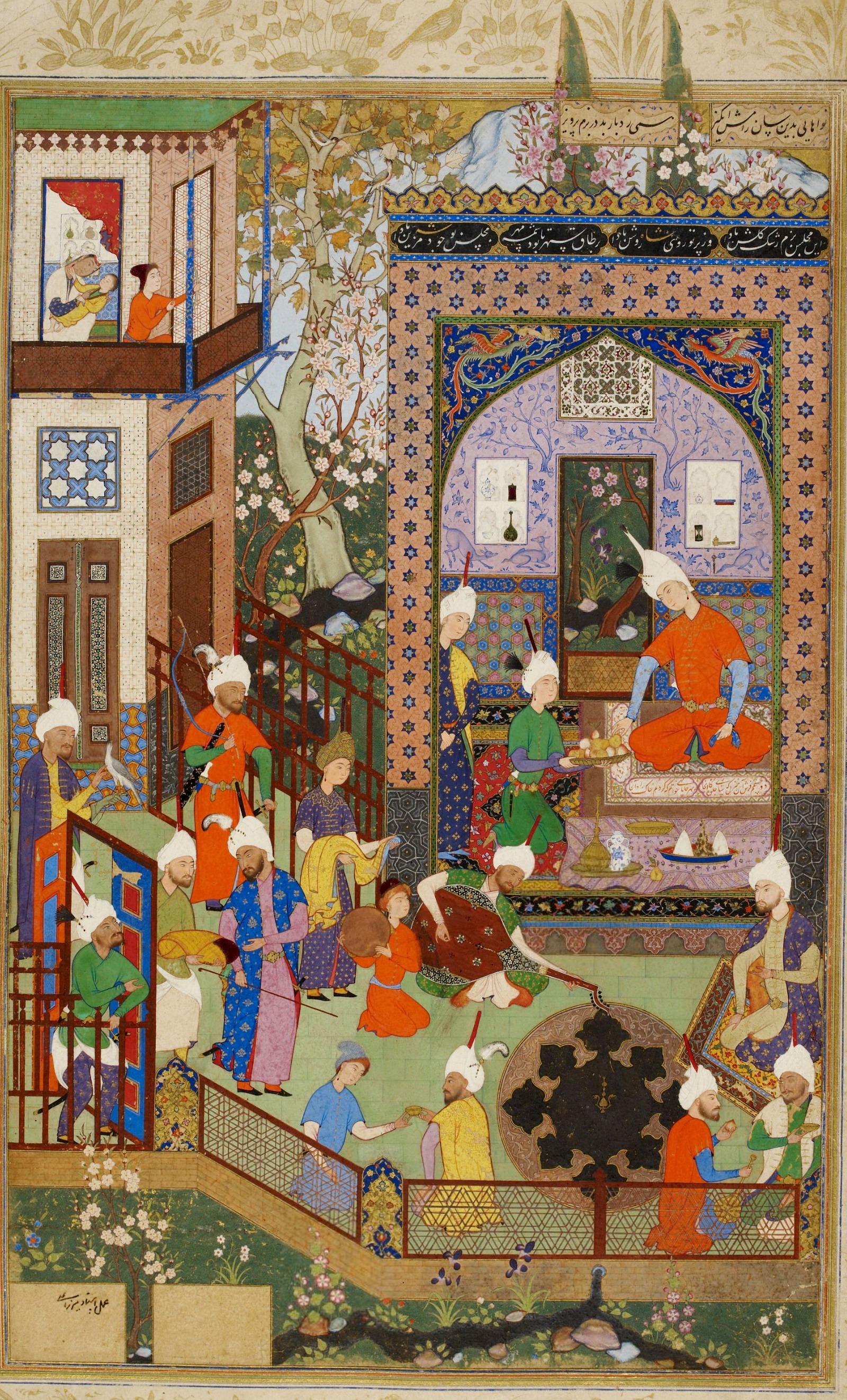
Barbad Plays for Khusraw, Khamsa of Nizami, British Library, Oriental 2265, 1539–43, inscribed Mirza Ali at bottom left.

'Abd al-Ṣamad or Khwaja 'Abd-us-Ṣamad Shirazi (Persian: خواجه عبدالصمد شیرازی), was a 16th century painter of Persian miniatures who moved to India and became one of the founding masters of the Mughal miniature tradition, and later the holder of a number of senior administrative roles. 'Abd's career under the Mughals, from about 1550 to 1595, is relatively well documented, and a number of paintings are authorised to him from this period. From about 1572 he headed the imperial workshop of the Emperor Akbar and "it was under his guidance that Mughal style came to maturity". It has recently been contended by a leading specialist, Barbara Brend, that Samad is the same person as Mirza Ali, a Persian artist whose documented career seems to end at the same time as Abd al-Samad appears working for the Mughals.

== Mirza Ali ==
Mirza Ali's name first appears in a famous manuscript of the Khamsa of Nizami, now British Library Oriental 2265, which is dated March 1543. According to Stuart Cary Welch, there are only three other mentions of him in contemporary records. These say that he was the son of another leading artist of the court workshop, Sultan Muhammed, and so grew up in the milieu of the court atelier, and was a distinguished painter. Kamal of Tabriz is recorded as a pupil of his. The inscriptions in BL Or. 2265 are among the main sources for attributing Persian miniatures of the period. Six painters are named, and although the inscriptions are additions rather than signatures, they have been generally accepted as correct. Mirza Ali's name is inscribed on two miniatures, both courtyard scenes, and his father's on one, to which Welch adds two more un-inscribed miniatures.

Welch further attributes several earlier miniatures to Mirza Ali, including six from the Shahnameh of Shah Tahmasp of the 1520s; Brend is sympathetic to at least two of these attributions, but finds two unlikely, in terms of agreement with the style of the later works. After considering some other isolated works, with mixed verdicts on his attributions, she firmly parts company with Welch over his attributions to Mirza Ali of six miniatures in another famous manuscript, the Haft Aurang made for Prince Ibrahim Mirza in 1555–56 (now Freer Gallery of Art), after he should, if he were indeed also Samad, have left for Afghanistan and then India. Welch admits that the style of these paintings is different, but attributes this to a change in the spirit of the times, an explanation Brend finds hard to accept, although the attributions are repeated by other scholars writing after Brend's paper; Sheila S. Blair finds they display "the artist's increasing spirituality and mannerism". After discussing other aspects of the question, and comparing the styles of Mirza Ali and Samad, Brend suggests that they are indeed the same artist, who adopted a sobriquet on moving to a new country. Stylistic similarities include the layout of courtyard compositions and the arrangements of colour, details like a fondness for the virtuosic depiction of grilles and open-work screens, and similar treatment of figures.

== Samad ==
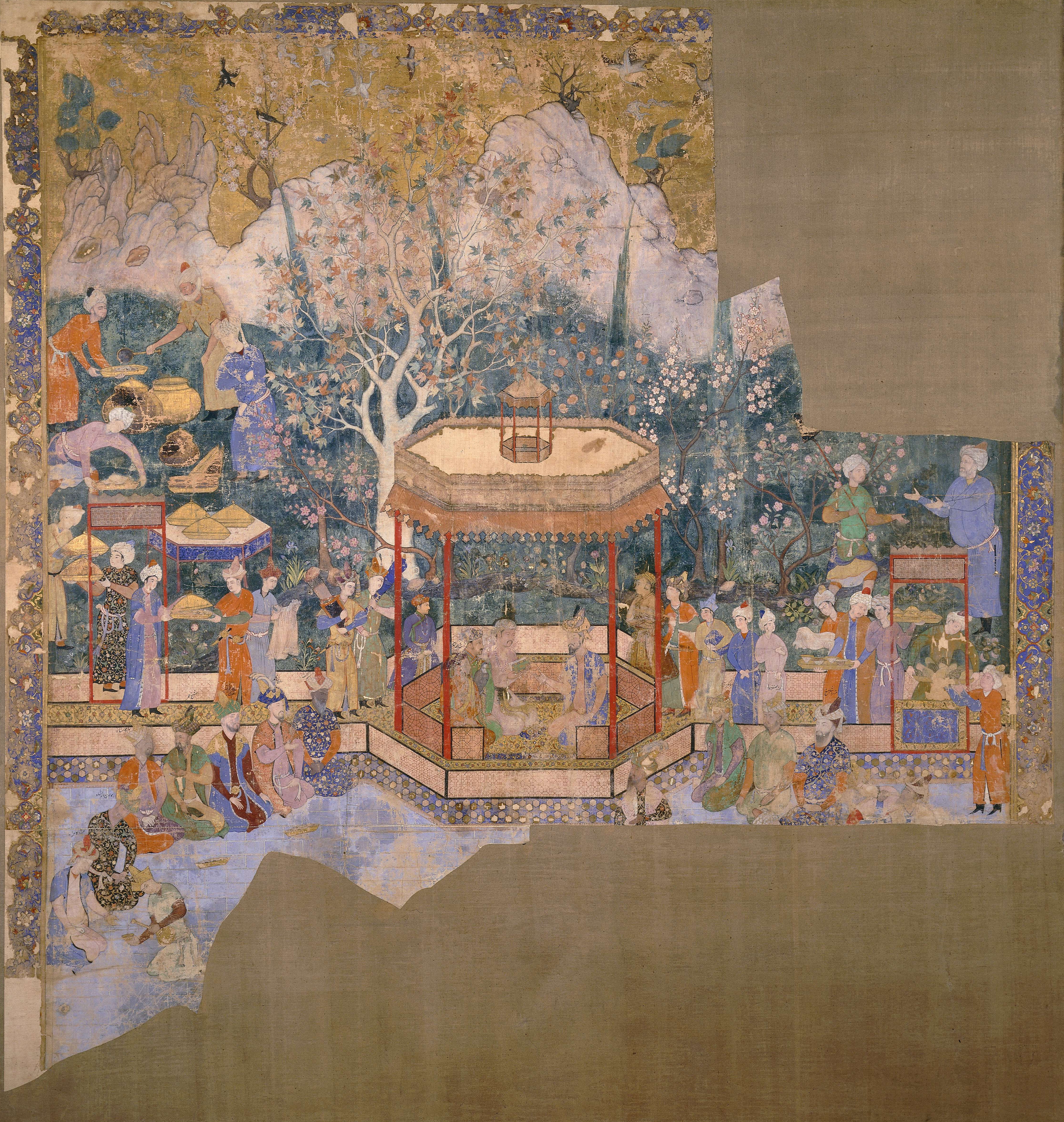
The earliest known example of a Mughal painting, Princes of the House of, Timur (c. 1550–55), is attributed to Abd al-Samad. It was probably executed for Humayun, and added to under later emperors to update the family tree. Painted with gouache and gold on fine cotton fabric. British Museum

One source says that Samad's father was the vizier of Shah Shoja Mozaffari, a difficulty with her theory that Brend explains by speculating that this was instead his grandfather, in whose house he was brought up while Sultan Muhammed established his career at court. According to Mughal records, Samad became a master in the court workshop of the Safavid Shah, Tahmasp I. He was also a calligrapher, something not mentioned in connection with Mirza Ali. No works are generally attributed to him before about 1544–45, although Welch attributes a miniature in the much earlier Shah Tahmasp Shahnameh to him. Brend finds this painting "unsatisfactory" and the work of an inexperienced painter.

Samad first met the exiled Mughal emperor Humayun in Tabriz in 1544. In 1546, Humayun asked Tahmasp to release Samad and his fellow Persian Mir Sayyid Ali from his service so that he could engage them, and in about 1549, they arrived at Humayun's temporary capital in Kabul, where Samad was engaged by Humayun to teach his son Akbar, and possibly the emperor himself, how to draw. With Mir Sayyid Ali and Dust Muhammad, another Persian, Samad "introduced a fully imperial Persian style into the Mughal ateliers", which seem previously to have been small and consisting of artists trained in various centres including Bukhara. Samad probably worked on the unusually large painting of the Princes of the House of Timur (British Museum), which Humayun commissioned about 1550–55, in particular on the landscape background. In 1552, a group of single miniatures including work by the two Persians was included in a diplomatic gift to the ruler of Kashgar, as Humayun worked to assemble support to regain his throne. Some of his works from this period are in a muraqqa or album in the library of the Golestan Palace in Tehran (MSS 1663–4), still showing a thoroughly Safavid style. One of these miniatures depicts Akbar giving a miniature painting to his father Humayun, and includes Samad's name on a portfolio; the figure next to it is probably his portrait. The image both uses a fully Persian style, and includes thematic elements, including the self-portrait, that are "dazzling new departures in Islamic painting"

Samad and Mir Sayyid Ali followed the emperor on his return to India, only seven months before he died in 1556. They were retained by the fourteen-year-old Akbar who within a few years set about greatly expanding his court workshop. A drawing with muted colour, inscribed with Samad's name, in the Bodleian Library in Oxford depicts the arrest, three days after Akbar's accession, of Humayun's troublesome favourite, Abdu'l Ma'ali, who is seized from behind by a burly courtier. Both artists probably worked on the Tutinama, the first major commission completed in the new reign, where the disparate styles of the several artists used remain clear. But Mir Sayyid Ali was initially given the supervision of Akbar's huge commission of the 1400 large illustrations for the Akbar Hamzanama, which was to be fourteen years in the making.

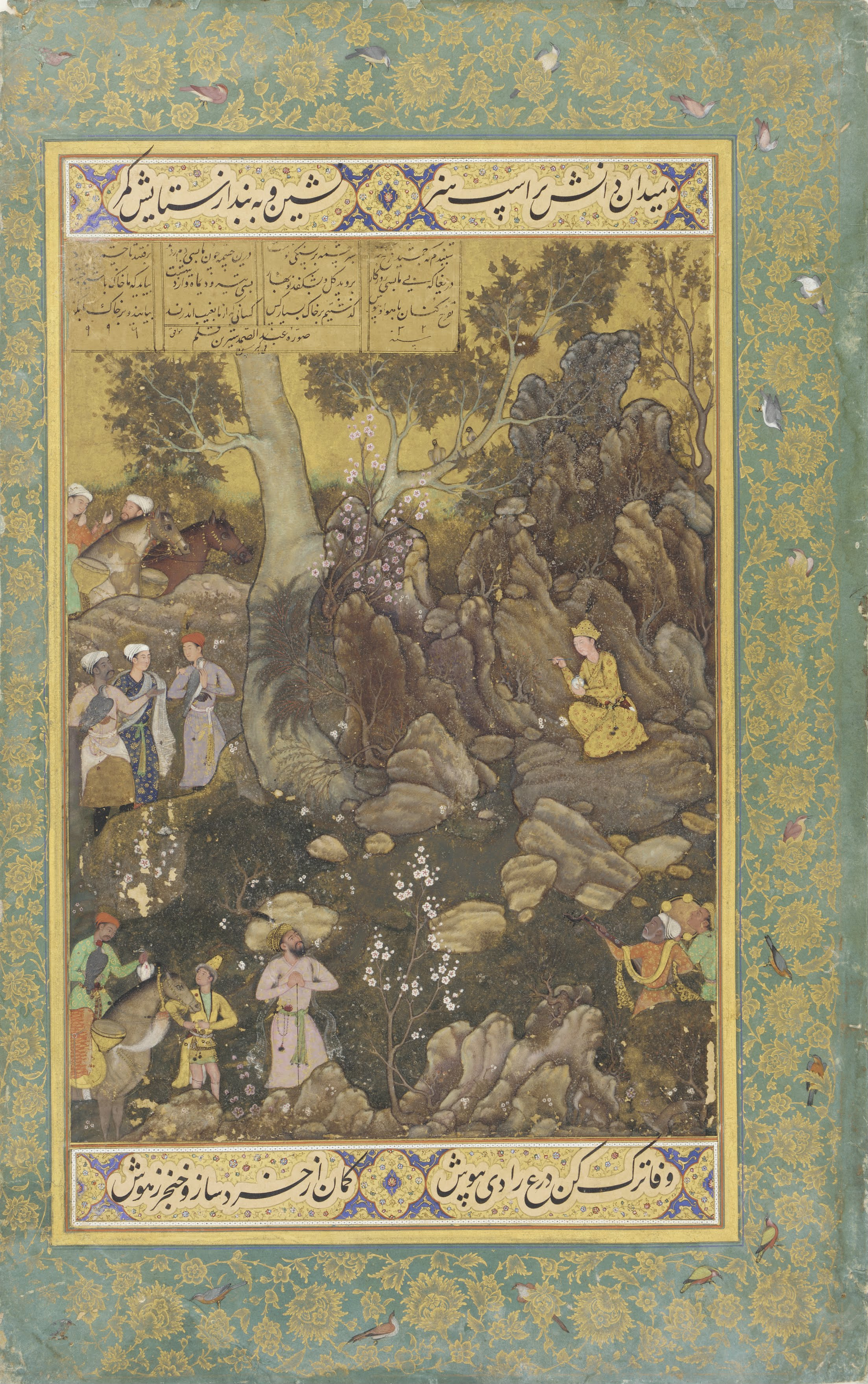
Jamshid writing on a rock, by Abd al-Samad in 1588

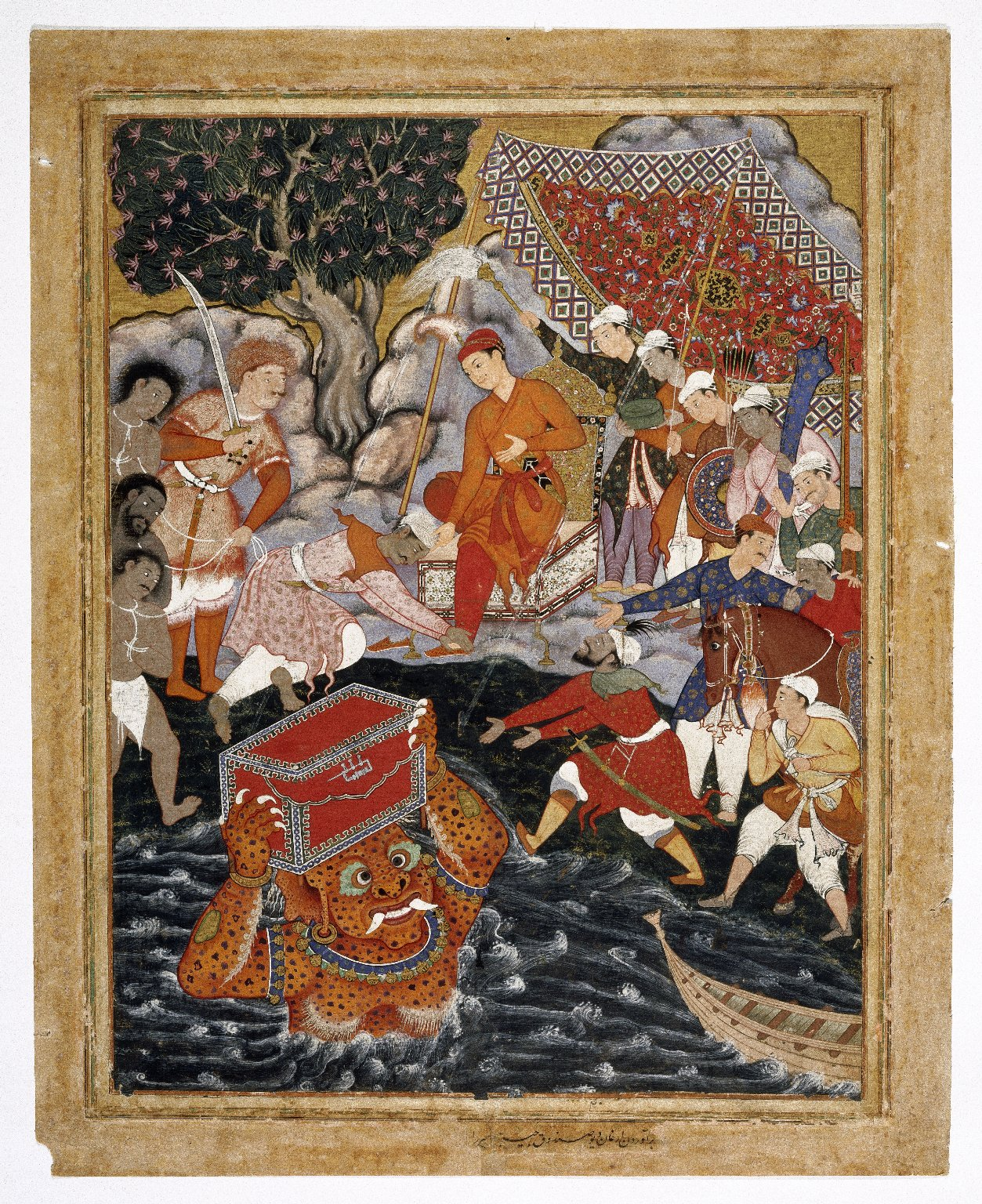
Arghan Div Brings the Chest of Armour to Hamza, from Volume 7 of the Hamzanama, supervised by Samad.

In about 1572, Samad replaced Mir Sayyid Ali (who returned to Persia) as head of the imperial workshop, probably because under Sayyid the progress of the illustrations for the Hamzanama was too slow. At this point the commission was seven years old and only four of the volumes were complete. Under Samad's direction the remaining ten volumes were completed in another seven years. It is uncertain whether Samad painted any of them himself, but "the direction of Mughal painting increasingly came to follow the aims pursued by ‛Abd al-Samad. It is likely that the increased central control that became evident by the Lahore period [1580s on] can be attributed to this artist". Among the mostly Hindu artists trained by Samad were Daswanth and Basawan, who went on to become famous Mughal painters.

Despite his role in forging the new Mughal synthesis of Persian and Indian styles, Samad's own works remain conservative, with a great interest in detail, and rather less in the new style of dramatic narrative and realism favoured by the young Akbar. But by the 1590s elements of his style, including a taste for detail, were in favour, though after his death Mughal painting turned in the direction of simpler compositions emphasising human interactions. He did not have the gift for realistic portraiture which Mughal painting introduced to the Islamic miniature, and unlike many Mughal artists, shows few borrowings from the European prints and other art available in Akbar's court.

In 1576, Akbar put Samad in charge of the Fatehpur Sikri mint, in 1582 he was made "overseer of commerce" and the next year put in charge of the royal household. In 1584, Akbar made him dewan (official in charge of finances) of Multan. He was given a mansab of 400 and honoured with the title of Shirin Qalam (sweet pen). The moves may have been in recognition of his talent for administration, but it has been suggested that "Akbar preferred a more robust approach than that of his romanticised Persian style of painting". But he continued to paint and his last known work is a miniature, of Khosrow II hunting, in the illustrations of the 1595 manuscript of the Khamsa of Nizami. Works with his name inscribed include a drawing of Akbar with a Dervish (Aga Khan Museum, c. 1586–87). Another late work is a version of a famous Persian composition of two camels fighting by Behzād, which an inscription says was done at the request of his son Sharif when he was infirm. He "must have died in the last years of the century".

He had two painter sons, Muhammad Sharif, and one called Bizhad, for the famous Persian artist Behzād (c. 1450 – c. 1535). Muhammad Sharif was a friend of the next emperor Jahangir, and like his father was given important administrative roles, a pattern unique among the many Mughal painter families. Not all scholars are convinced these sons were not just one, as while Muhammad Sharif is relatively well documented, Bizhad is apparently only known from inscriptions on miniatures.
