= Basawan =

Mughal Indian artist (active 1580–1600)

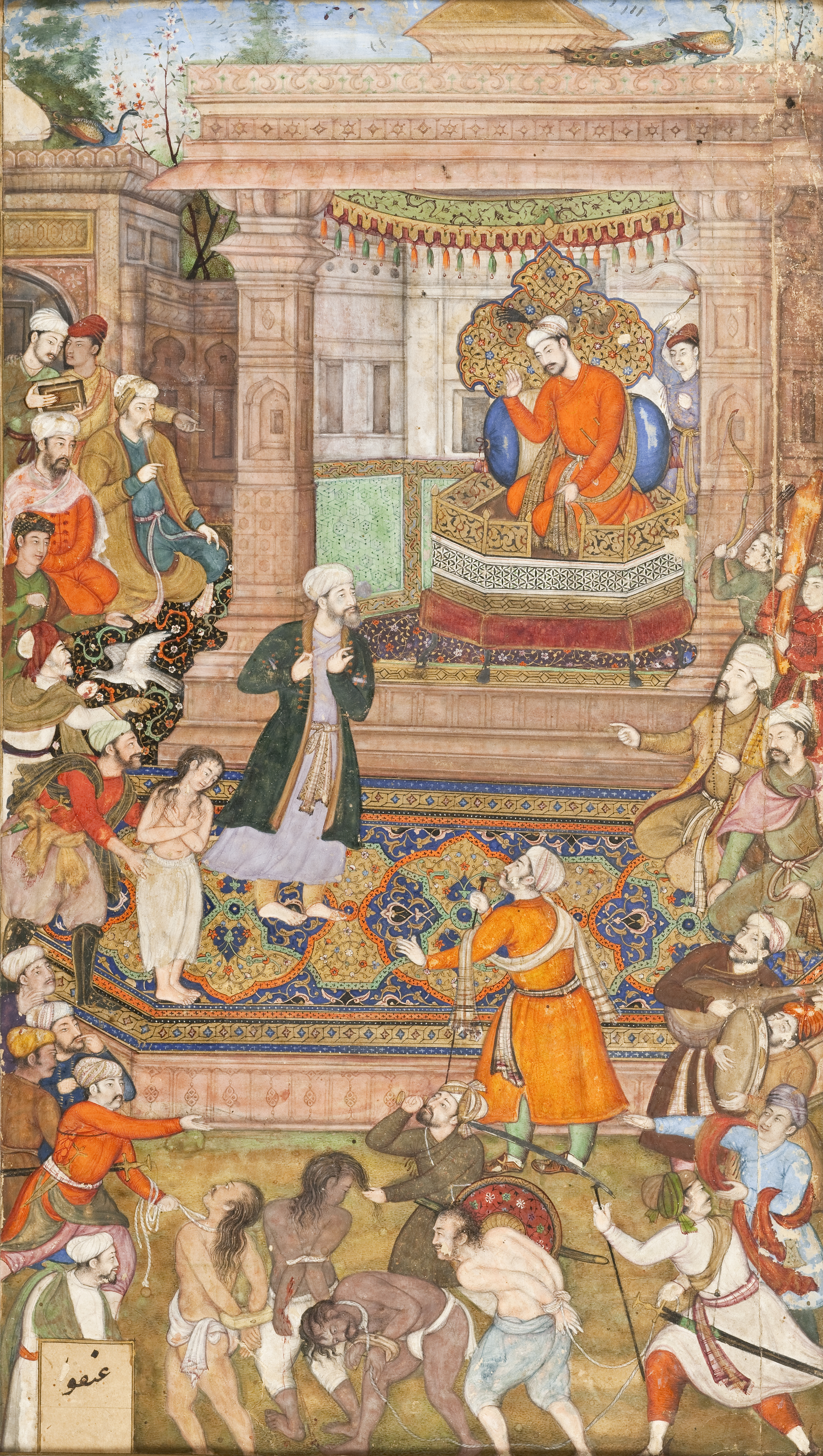
A Court Scene from Sadi's Gulistan (Rose Garden), 1596

Basāwan Yadav, or Basāvan Yadav (flourished 1580–1600), was an Indian miniature painter in the Mughal style. He was known by his contemporaries as a skilled colorist and keen observer of human nature, and for his use of portraiture in the illustrations of Akbarnama, Mughal Emperor, Akbar's official Biography, which is seen as an innovation in Indian art.

== Biography ==
Little is known of the life of Basawan. He was a Yadav from Uttar Pradesh who became a court painter for Akbar, where he came under the influence of Abd al-Samad. Only four artists have been commented on in the Ain-i-Akbari. It includes Sayyid Ali, Abd al-Samad, Daswanth and Basawan. Basawan's son Manohar Das succeeded him as a court painter. His family still lives in their heritage home in Kala Mahal, Agra. Currently, the family is holding a manufacturing and export business of handmade carpets (Diamond Carpets).

== Work ==
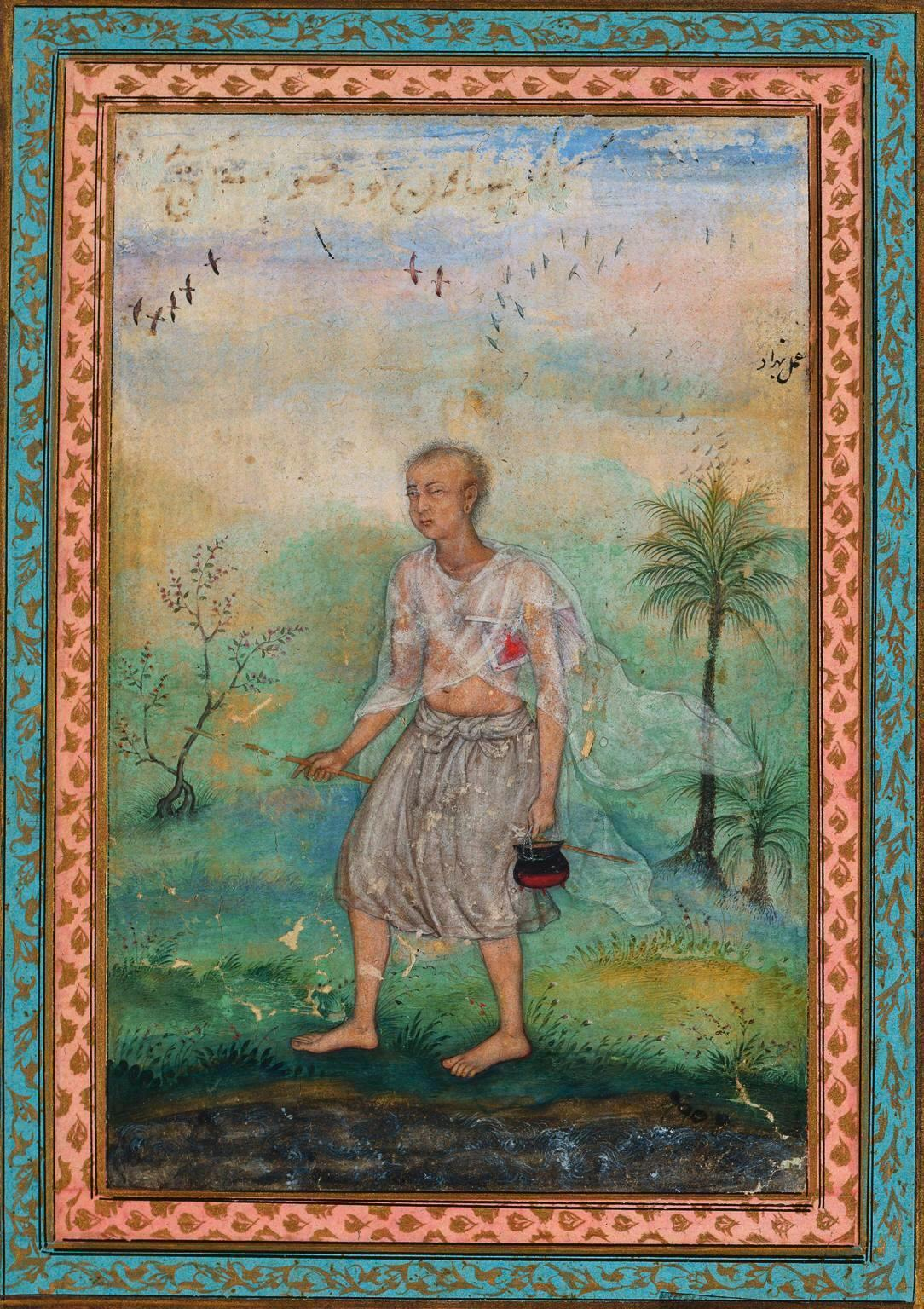
A Jain ascetic walking along a riverbank, c .1600.

Over 100 paintings are attributed to Basawan. His earliest mention is found in an illustrated version of Tutinama c. 1556–61. Most of them are illustrations for manuscripts. In many of them, Basawan was the designer, in collaboration with a second artist who supplied the color. Among the works that can definitely be attributed to Basawan are illustrations for the Razmnama, the Akbar-nama, the Darab-nama, the Baharistan of Jami and the Timur-name.

Basawan was one of the first Indian artists to be interested in western techniques, inspired by the European paintings brought to Akbar's court by Jesuit missionaries. It can be seen in his use of strong contrasts of light and shade, although Western influence is never predominant in his work. Basawan was also noted for his exploration of space, the delineation of his backgrounds, the strength of his colors, and the strong, moving characterizations of his subjects. Abu al-Fadl 'Allami, historiographer for Akbar, wrote about Basawan: "In designing and portrait painting and colouring and painting illusionistically... he became unrivalled in the world". Despite these significant contributions to Mughal Art, he is not recognized on a wide scale outside of academia regarding art in the Western Hemisphere.
