= Jahangir Entertains Shah Abbas =

Miniature painting by Abu'l Hasan

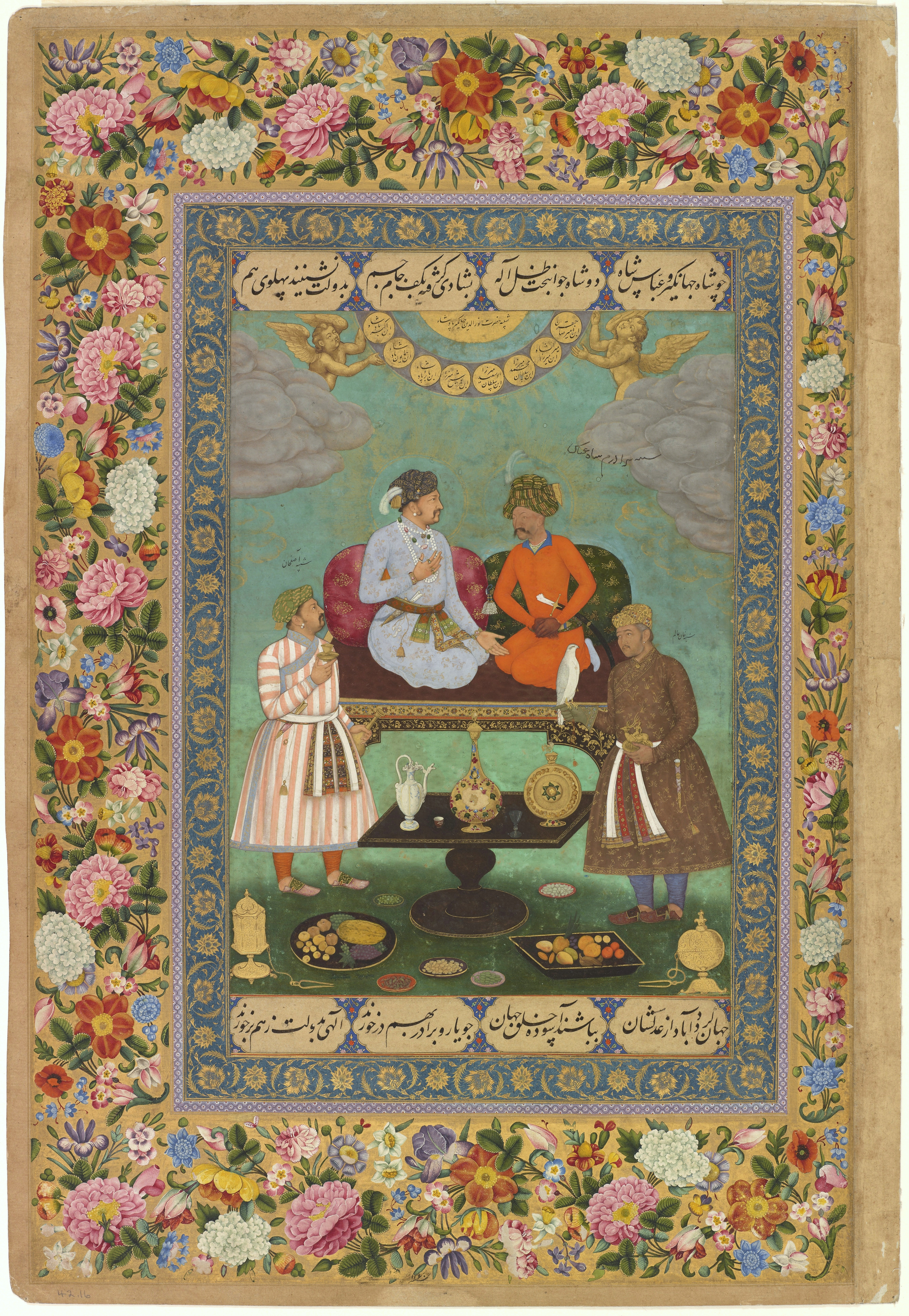
- Artist: Bishandas
- Year: c.1620; borders c. 1746-47
- Medium: Opaque water color, gold and ink on paper
- Subject: Jahangir and Shah Abbas I
- Location: Freer Gallery of Art, Washington, D.C.

Jahangir Entertains Shah Abbas is a Mughal miniature painting by the artist Bishandas. It is located in the Freer Gallery of Art in Washington, D.C.

== Background ==
The work dates to 1620. A possible explanation for the commissioning of this work, and other imaginary scenes, such as Jahangir Shooting the head of Malik Ambar, would be that they were attempts to influence the real world through depicting them in the imaginary realm. Malik Ambar and Shah Abbas I were two of Jahangir's fiercest adversaries, and while the former was depicted dead with Jahangir shooting arrows at his head, Shah Abbas is depicted in a deferential position to the emperor. This deference is also apparent in another such painting, Jahangir Embracing Shah Abbas.

During Nader Shah's invasion of India, this painting was among the ones looted and mounted on the "St. Petersburg album".

== Description ==
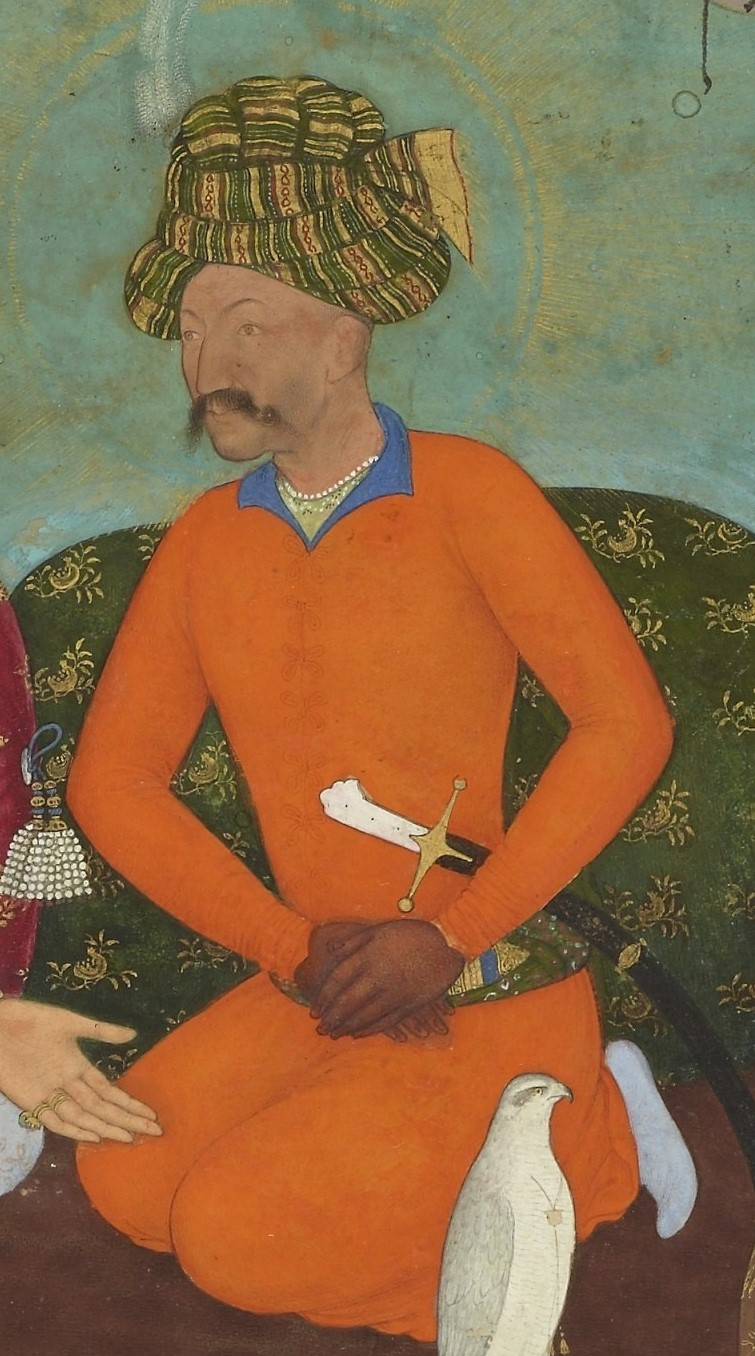
Shah Abbas appears to be listening to his host deferentially.

At the top of the painting are two angels, who are holding up a genealogy of Jahangir, tracing his descent from Timur.

The painting depicts an imaginary meeting between Jahangir and Shah Abbas. They are seated on a floating throne, seemingly hovering against the green background. They are flanked by two attendants—to the left of Jahangir is Asaf Khan, who served as grand vizier of the empire, and was the older brother of empress Nur Jahan. To the right of Shah Abbas is Khan Alam, the representative of the Mughal empire in the Safavid court.

Jahangir is portrayed as slightly larger, and more self-assured than his guest. Shah Abbas appears to be listening to him deferentially. Both the rulers have a halo around them.

In front of the two kings are various luxurious objects. These include an Italian table and a Chinese porcelain cup. Asaf Khan holds up a wine bottle and cup. Khan Alam is holding an automaton of Diana on a Stag.
