= Squirrels in a Plane Tree =

17th-century painting by Abu'l Hasan and Mansur

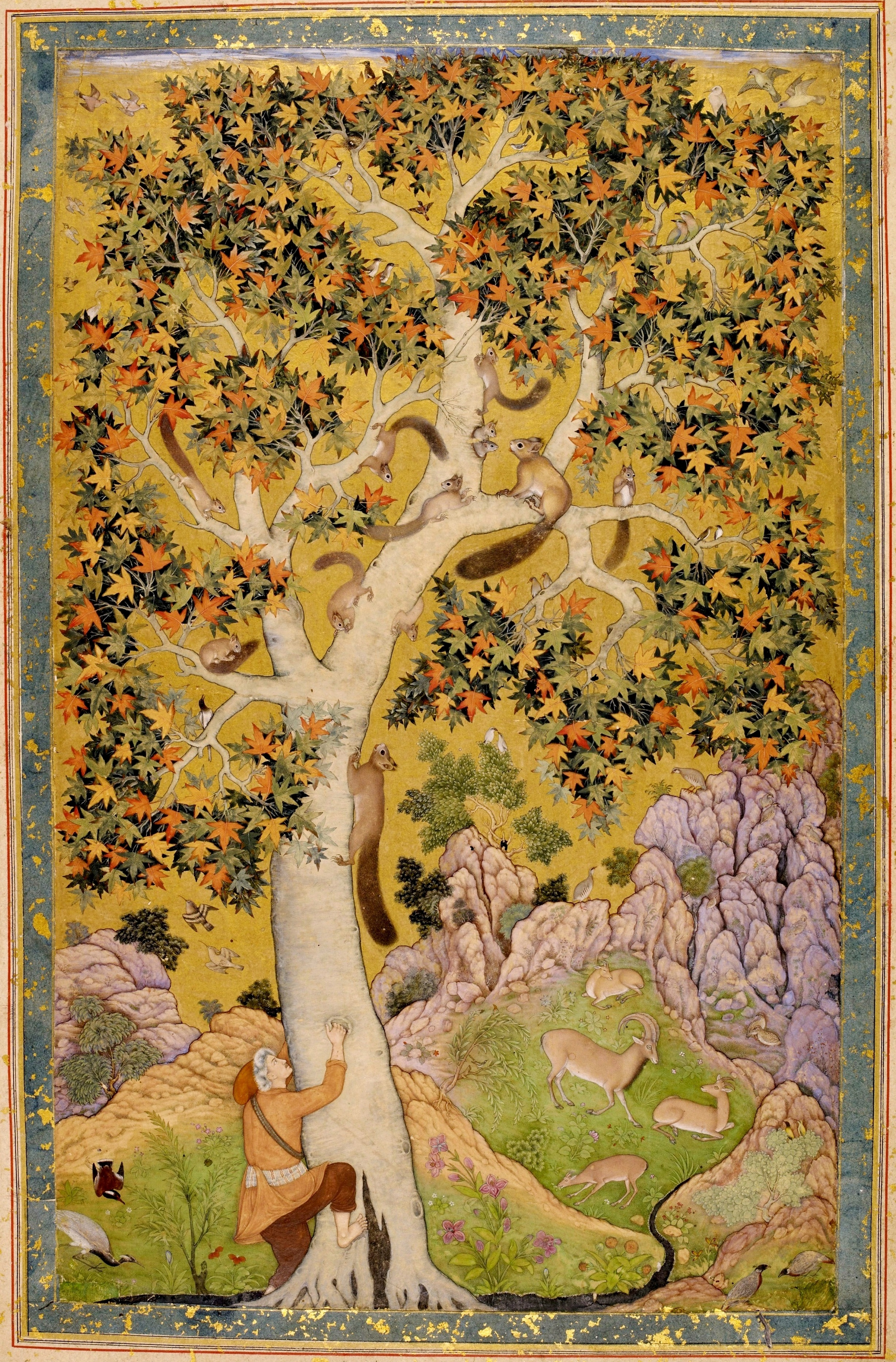
- Year: c. 1610
- Medium: Gouache with gold on paper
- Dimensions: 362 by 225 mm
- Location: British Library, London

Squirrels in a Plane Tree is a 17th-century Mughal painting located in the British Library. It was painted around 1610 by the artists Abu'l Hasan and Mansur, who were leading court artists during the reign of the Mughal emperor Jahangir.

== Description ==
The painting depicts an Oriental plane tree, set against a golden sky. Empty spaces that are not occupied by the tree are filled with several flying birds. Several squirrels, as well as various kinds of birds, are present amidst the branches of the tree. At the base of the tree is a barefooted man attempting to climb it. The man is dressed in a woollen tunic and wears a fur hat. The surrounding landscape contains a stream winding down from rock formations and various birds and animals.

On the back is an inscription that credits the artists Nasir al-Zaman ("Wonder of the Times") and Nasir al-Asr ("Wonder of the Age"). The former was a title of Abu'l Hasan and the latter of Mansur, thus indicating the collaboration.

== Analysis ==
The Mughal emperor Jahangir is known for his interest in flora and fauna. During his reign, the depiction of flora and fauna reached a high degree of naturalism. This work is one of the most famous of natural history paintings of Jahangir's reign.

Stuart Cary Welch describes the painting as a "masterpiece of natural history picture" and speculates that the man climbing the tree may represent mankind and its destruction of nature. He also offers the alternative speculation, that the man might be an artist, wanting to collect squirrel-hair to make paintbrushes. Toby Falk and Mildred Archer argue in Indian Miniatures in the India Office Library that a prima facie interpretation of the image is not appropriate owing to its large size and the deliberate care taken in its composition. It is also noted that squirrels were not generally hunted in India, and that the painting's interpretation as only a squirrel-hunt is unlikely.

Murad Khan Mumtaz interprets the tree to represent the tree of life, with the climber being a dervish.
