= Mir Hashim (artist) =

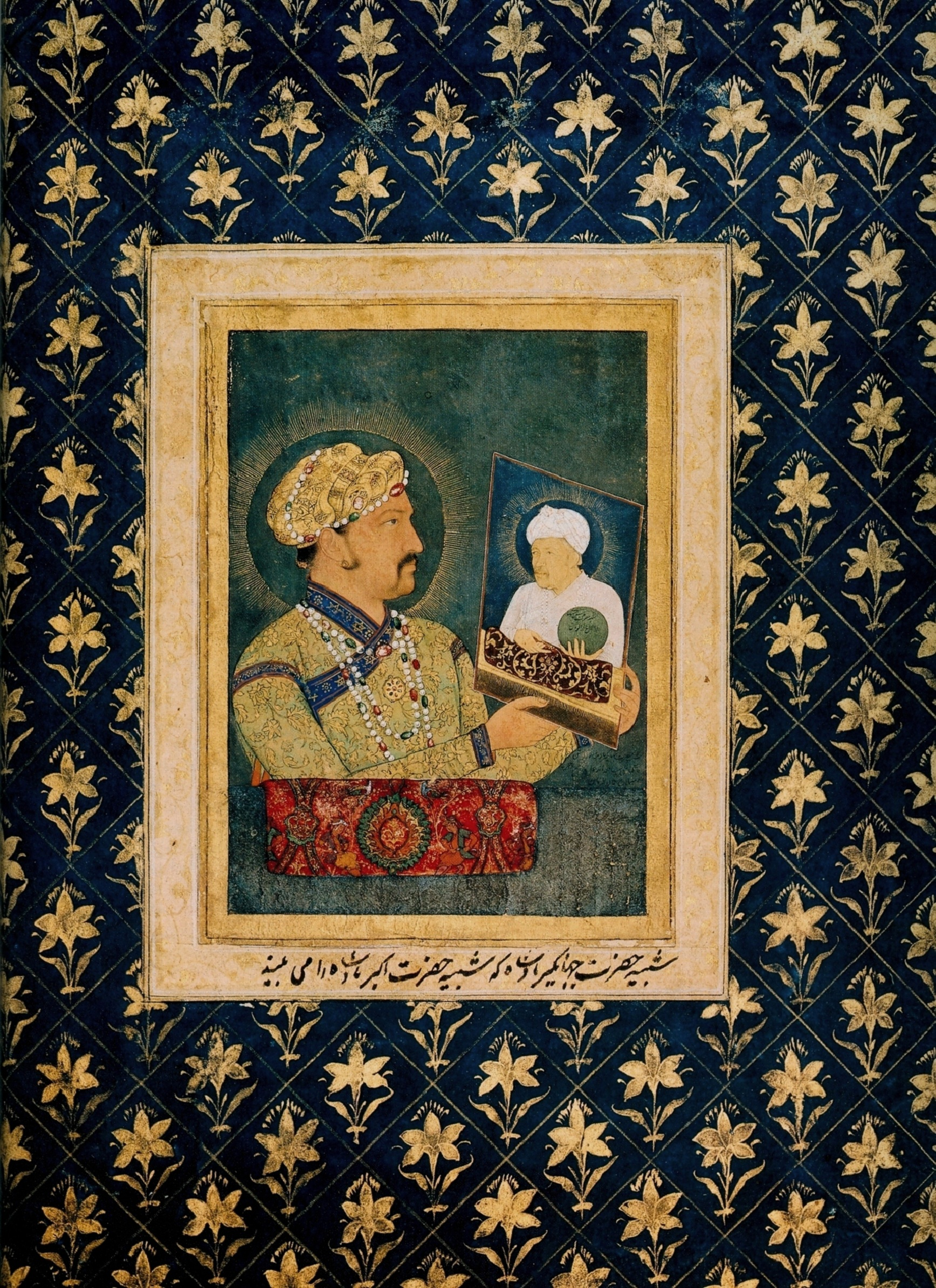
Jahangir with a Potrait of Akbar

Mir Hashim was a seventeenth-century Mughal miniature portrait painter. He painted during the reigns of Jahangir and Shah Jahan for approximately forty years. Hashim's career spanned from Bijapur or Ahmednagar to Burhanpur, spanning Mughal India and the Deccan.

== Style ==
His portraiture is characterized by precise technical skill, rather than attention to human emotion or warmth, as is characteristic of courtly portrait painters. He is known to have subjects cross their hands in front of their waists. His attention to textiles and jewelry is also noted by art historians, as well as formal details, such as style of painting hands and eyes. Though he mostly painted individual portraits, he occasionally ventured into painting multiple subjects.

== Subjects and major works ==
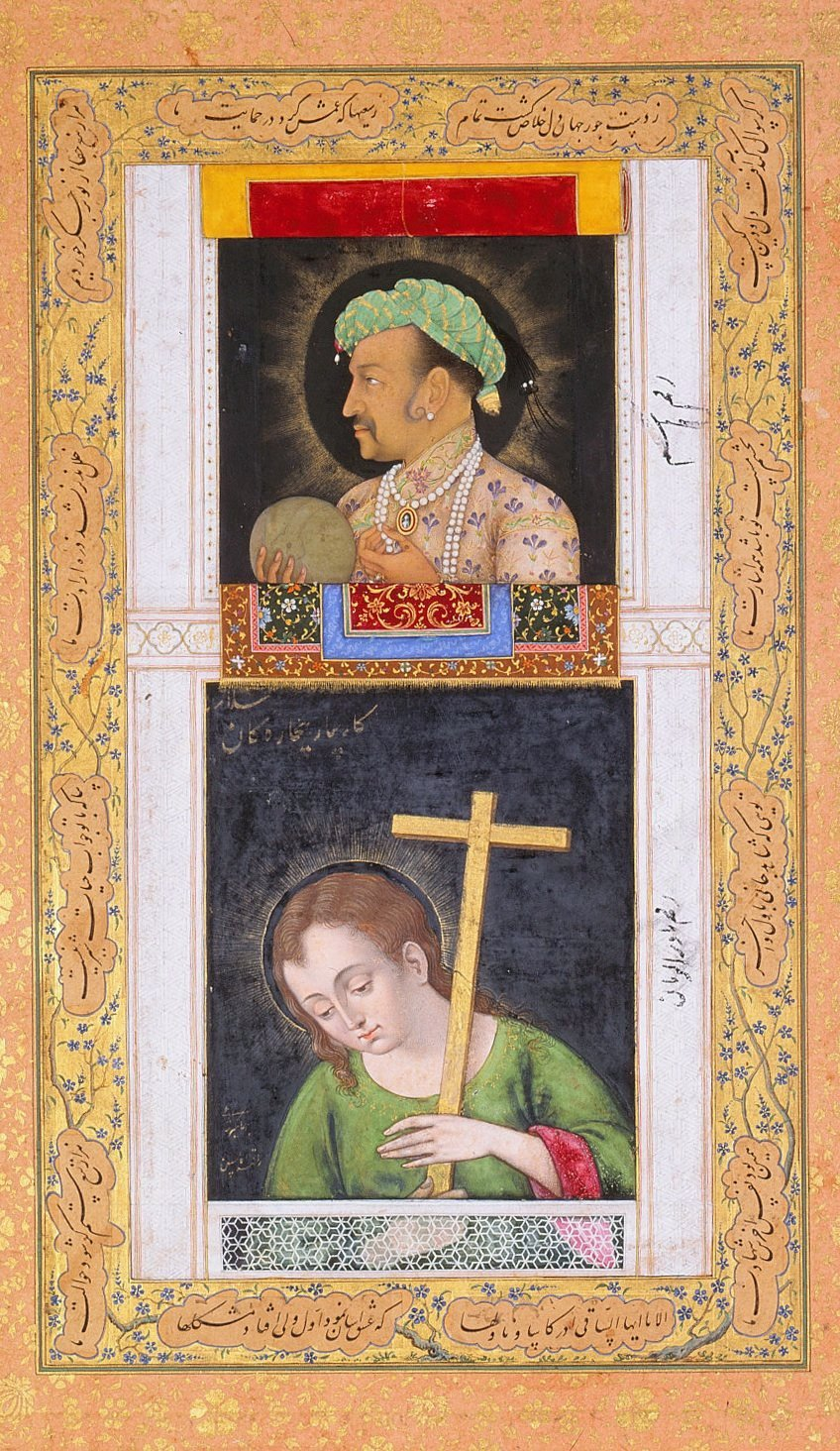
Jahangir and Christ (1615–1620), hosted in the Chester Beatty Library in Dublin

His subjects include courtly figures, including the rulers Jahangir and Shah Jahan, as well as other local leaders. Some of his works include Portrait of Jadun Ray Deccani, Portrait of Ibraham Adil Shah II, Muhammed Qutb Shah of Golconda, The Emperor Shah Jahan Standing on a Globe, along several more. One of his most famous paintings is Jahangir with a Portrait of Akbar, which was created in collaboration with Abu'l Hasan. Another collaborative portrait with the same artist is Jahangir and Christ.

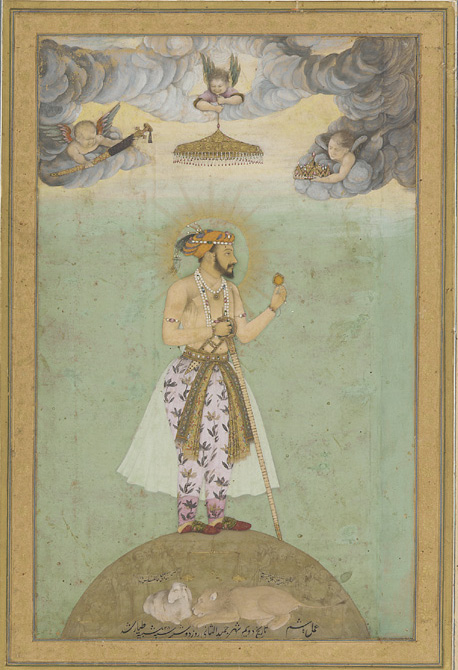
The Emperor Shah Jahan Standing on a Globe
