= Jahangir Visiting the Ascetic Jadrup =

Painting by Govardhan

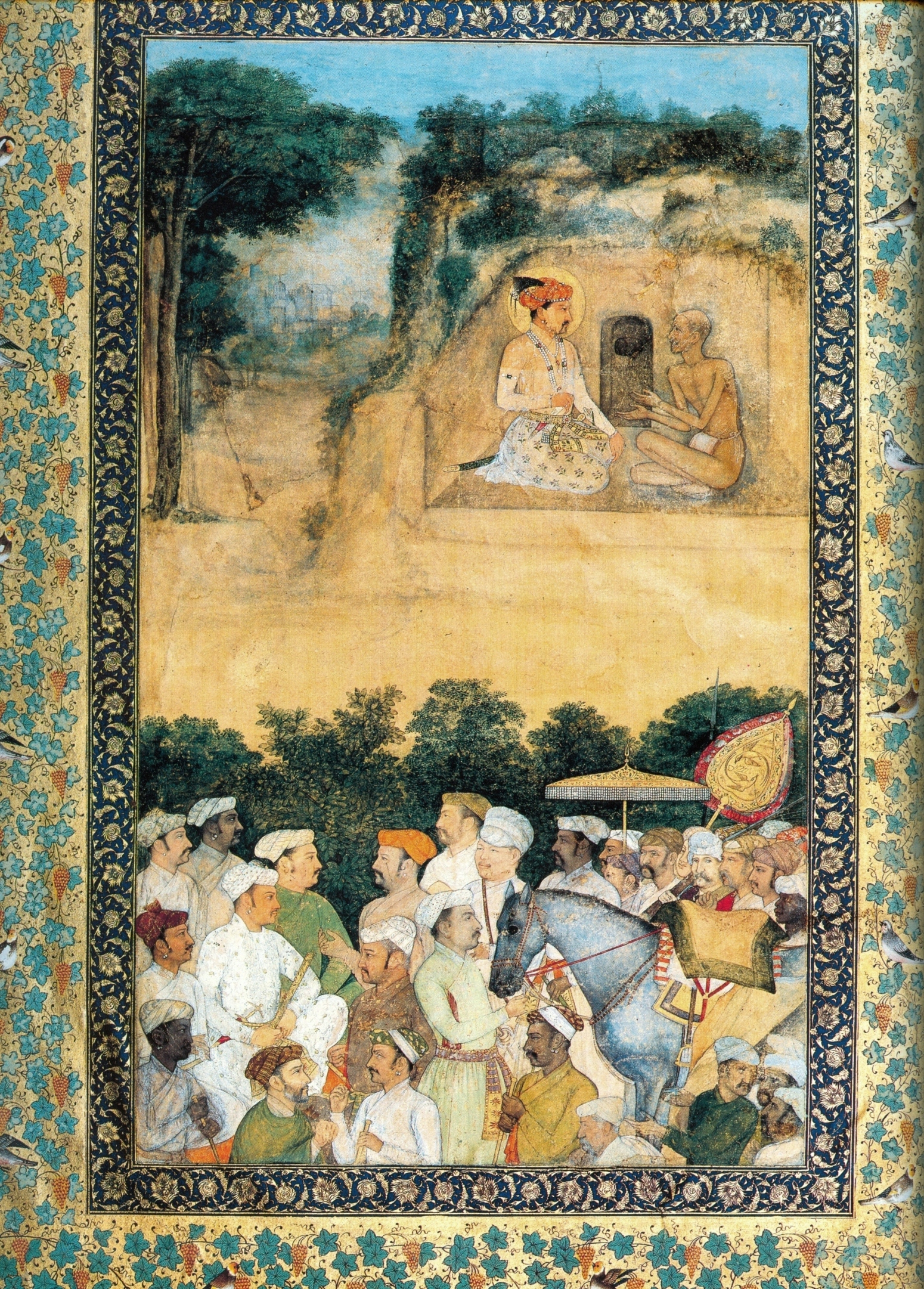
- Artist: Govardhan
- Year: c. 1620
- Medium: Opaque watercolor on paper
- Movement: Mughal
- Dimensions: 32.5 cm × 19.3 cm (12.8 in × 7.6 in)
- Location: Louvre, Paris

Jahangir Visiting the Ascetic Jadrup is a Mughal painting by the artist Govardhan, dated to about 1620. It depicts the lavishly dressed Mughal emperor Jahangir visiting the ascetic Jadrup, inside the latter's cave dwelling. It is now in the Louvre, Paris.

== Background ==
Govardhan was an artist in the court of the Mughal emperor Jahangir. The work was painted in order to illustrate a scene from Jahangir's autobiography, the Jahangirnama, wherein he recounts his visit to the ascetic Jadrup. Jadrup is described as a follower of the Vedanta tradition.

Several scholars, including Kavita Singh, have noted that in depicting the visit of a Muslim emperor to a Hindu ascetic, the painting proves to be an example of religious syncretism that developed at the Mughal court. Murad Khan Mumtaz, however, argues against this interpretation, noting that the Mughal would have seen Jadrup and his beliefs with an Islamizing lens. In his autobiography, Jahangir writes, "the science of Vedanta is the science of Sufism".

The structure of the painting is heavily inspired by a scene often illustrated in manuscripts of the Iskandarnameh of Nizami. The scene would consist of Alexander on the left and Plato on the right, with a city in the background, and Alexander's horse, groom, and attendants nearby.

== Description ==
The painting is divided into two registers. The upper register, occupying the upper one-third of the painting is occupied by the emperor Jahangir and his host, the ascetic Jadrup. In a traditional Mughal painting of a durbar scene, this top-most register would contain the throne. Jahangir and Jadrup are both seated, facing each other, outside the latter's cave. While the emperor is dressed in brocade and pearls, Jadrup is wearing only a loincloth. Furthermore, Jahangir is depicted to be larger than Jadrup and unlike Jadrup, has a halo around him. Jahangir has his feet tucked beneath him, as if he is performing the Islamic prayer. Jadrup has his hands raised, as if making a point, while the emperor listens to him. The entire upper register is painted in a similar gradient of ochre, yellow, and brown. This family of colors is used to depict both the skin of Jahangir and Jadrup as well as the soil, thus indicating their connection to the soil.

There is an intermediate tier between the two registers. This portion, which in a traditional scene would be occupied by high-ranking nobles, is left empty, as if to indicate that Jahangir and Jadrup have attained a spiritual status that no one else in the painting could even come close to. There is a dark green hedge that separates this tier from the lower register.

The lower register occupies the lower one-third of the painting. It is occupied by Jahangir's entourage and includes various courtiers and officials. This register contains symbols of worldly life, such as a horse, an umbrella, and a fan.

== Reception ==
B. N. Goswamy, in an article, writes that through the work, the artist asks the question of who, between Jahangir and Jadrup, is the real king. Murad Khan Mumtaz posits that the painting portrays a convention wherein "a worldly king submits, almost ritually, to a king of the spiritual realm". Kavita Singh praises the painting, writing, "It is with paintings like this that Mughal art is said to have reached its apogee under Jahangir".
