= Emperor Jahangir Triumphing over Poverty =

Mughal miniature painting (c. 1616–1618)

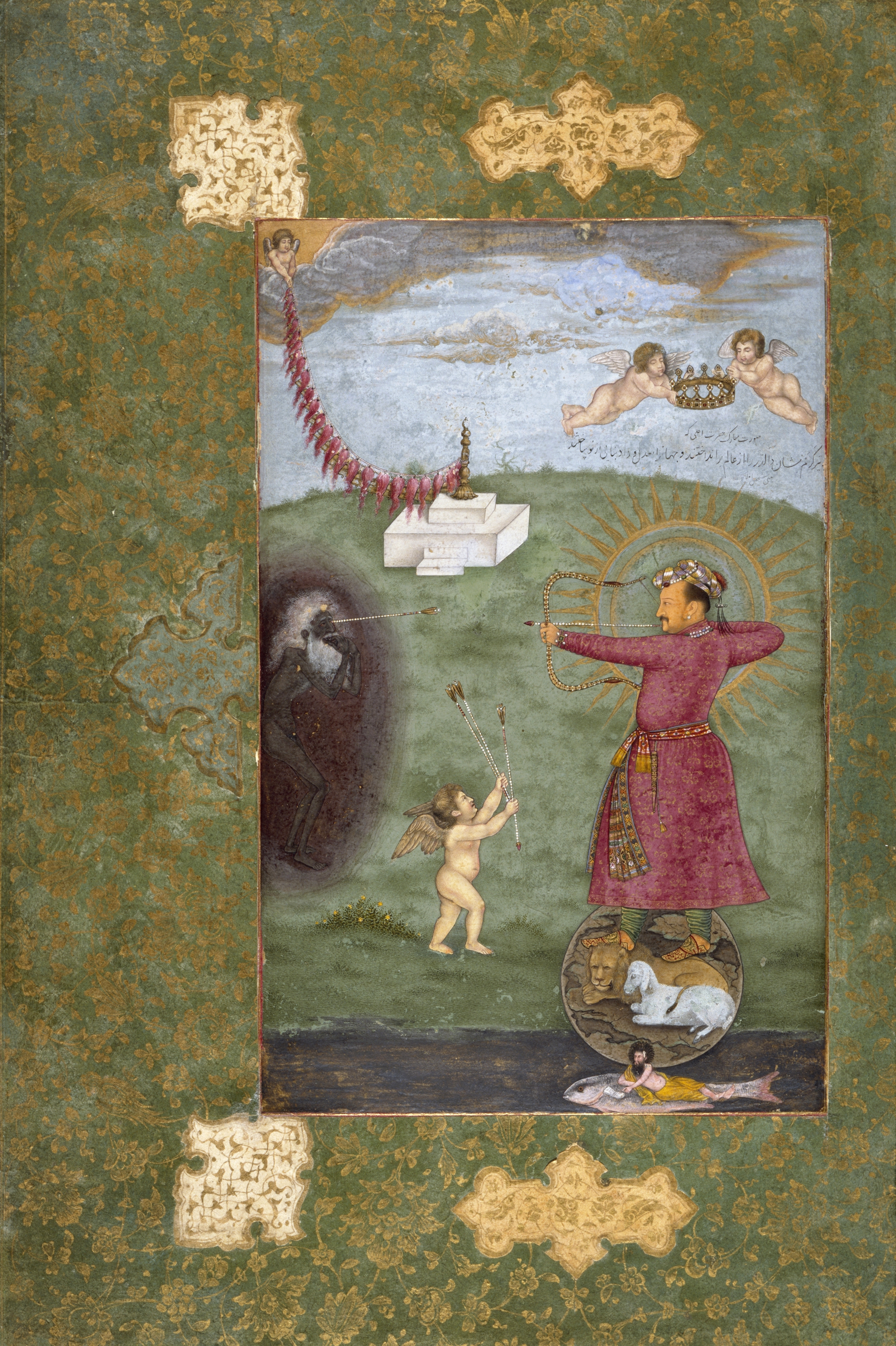
- Artist: Abu'l-Hasan
- Year: c. 1616–1618
- Medium: Opaque watercolor, gold, and ink on paper
- Subject: Jahangir
- Dimensions: 9 3/8 x 6 in. (23.81 x 15.24 cm)
- Location: Los Angeles County Museum of Art, Los Angeles

Emperor Jahangir Triumphing over Poverty, also known as Jahangir Takes Aim at Poverty and Jahangir Shooting Poverty, is a Mughal miniature painting located in the Los Angeles County Museum of Art.

It is part of a series of allegorical paintings commissioned by the Mughal emperor Jahangir in 1616–1618. It depicts Jahangir, standing upon a globe, shooting arrows at a personification of poverty. Various Islamic, Hindu, and Christian iconographical references are present on the painting.

== Background ==
This work is part of a series of allegorical paintings commissioned by the Mughal emperor Jahangir in 1616–1618. These would have been meant for a private audience—to be viewed at first by the emperor, and later by the noblemen of the court. However, the artists would subsequently produce copies of the works, intended for sale in the bazaars.

Although it does not have a signature or any other attribution, most scholars consider it to be a work of Abu'l-Hasan, the emperor's favorite artist. It is probable that this painting draws from Jahangir Shooting the Head of Malik Ambar, painted by the same artist. The painting is a folio, and was likely part of an album, although it now exists as a standalone work.

A famine, which swept across Mughal India prior to Jahangir's accession might explain the subject matter.

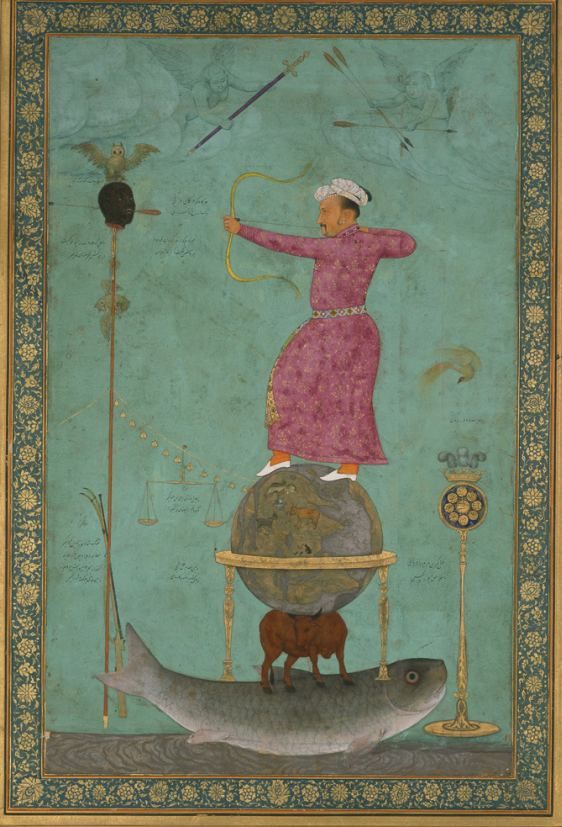
It is probable that this painting draws from Jahangir Shooting the Head of Malik Ambar (pictured), painted by the same artist.

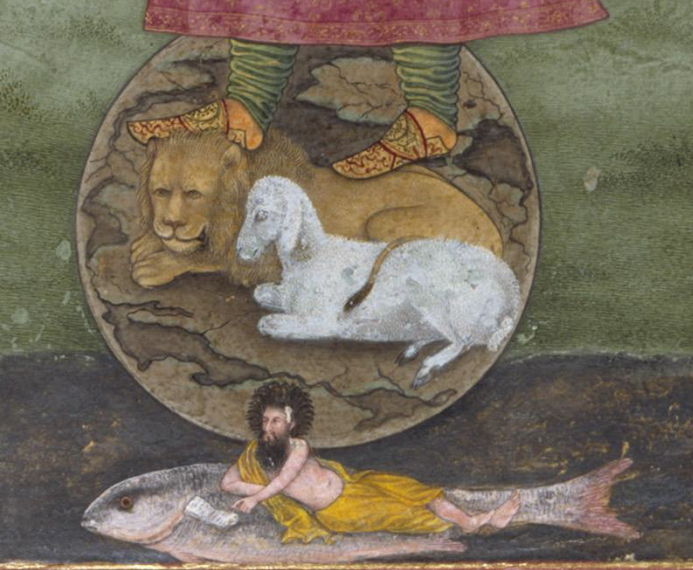
The emperor stands on a globe, where a lion and a lamb are placed together by his feet. The globe rests upon a bearded man, likely Manu, who in turn lies upon a fish, likely Matsya.

== Description ==
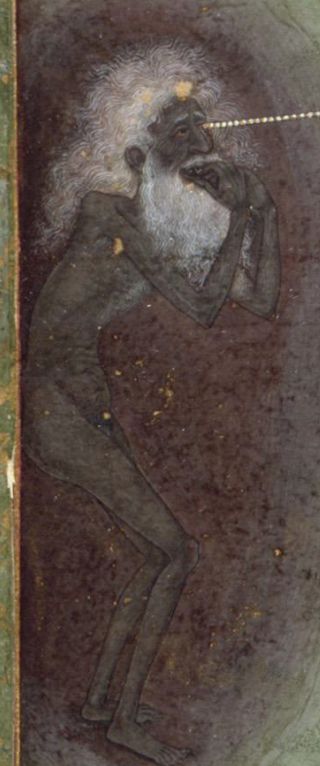
Daliddar, the personification of poverty, is depicted as a dark-skinned man with white hair. This deliberately contrasts with the depiction of Hindu ascetics, who are shown with light skin and dark hair.

The principal figure is the Mughal emperor Jahangir, shooting arrows at a dark figure in front of him. One arrow has already struck him, and is embedded in his eye, while a second arrow is about to be released. An inscription identifies this figure as daliddar, the personification of poverty. He is depicted as an emaciated old man, with dark skin and white hair. This deliberately contrasts with the traditional depiction of Hindu ascetics, who are usually shown with white skin and black hair.

Jahangir is shown wearing a mauve jama, with a katzeb tied around his waist, and a sun-like halo encircling his head. His hand is outstretched, as he takes aim at daliddar. By his side, a naked putto is shown holding three more arrows for the emperor to shoot.

Jahangir is standing upon a globe, and placed at his feet are a lion and a lamb. This representation of the two creatures side-by-side, known in Persian as "dad u dam" (transl. "beast and prey") is commonly seen in Mughal art. It is part of the iconography of various figures including Solomon, commonly portrayed seated upon a throne surrounded by the animals over which he had been granted dominion. The hunter and prey peacefully lying together, represent the golden age of peace brought about by a just ruler. The lion might also be a representation of the Mughal empire, with its accompanying sheep personifying Safavid Iran.

The globe rests upon a bearded man, who in turn, reclines upon a fish. The man is dark-haired, and is wearing a dhoti. He reads from a book, which might be one of the Vedas. It is likely that the man represents Manu, the progenitor of humanity in Hinduism, and correspondingly, the fish is a reference to the Matsya incarnation of Vishnu.

Two winged putti hover above the emperor, holding a crown meant for him. A white platform stands in the background, with a chain emerging from it, the other end of which is held by a putto in the upper left corner, emerging from the clouds above. This might allude to the zanjir-i adal, or "chain of justice", placed in the Mughal capital, where any subject might ring it seeking the emperor's justice. The chain rising up to the heavens is a reference to heavenly justice. Beyond this is a curved horizon.

== Analysis ==
Art critic B. N. Goswamy describes the painting as "brilliantly conceived" and "most skillfully executed". He goes on to state that although a political statement, the painting cannot be dismissed as such, and is of great quality.

The act of shooting at a personification of poverty is reminiscent of a Hindu practice, wherein people get rid of the signs of poverty from their homes before the festival of Diwali. This is done to ensure a prosperous beginning of the next year, following the festival. The emperor might be performing a similar ritual here, and an inscription on the painting notes that he is recreating the world anew. The Matsya fish carrying the progenitor Manu is also a symbol of cosmic rebirth, since Hindu mythology states that it carried Manu after a great flood, thus beginning a new cycle in time. It has also been posited that the painting was presented to its patron on the occasion of Diwali.

Shooting arrows is also reminiscent of the Hindu epic Ramayana. Although a Hindu text, it was much venerated by the Mughals, and manuscripts of the epic were commissioned for the Mughal court. One of the manuscripts has illustrations of the Hindu god Rama, who along with his brother Lakshmana, is shown shooting arrows at various monsters. The composition of this painting draws from such illustrations. This is seen especially in its placement of Jahangir and daliddar on the extreme ends of the frame opposite each other, and in the rendition of Jahangir's upper body.
