= Jahangir with a Portrait of Akbar =

Painting by Hashim and Abu'l-Hasan

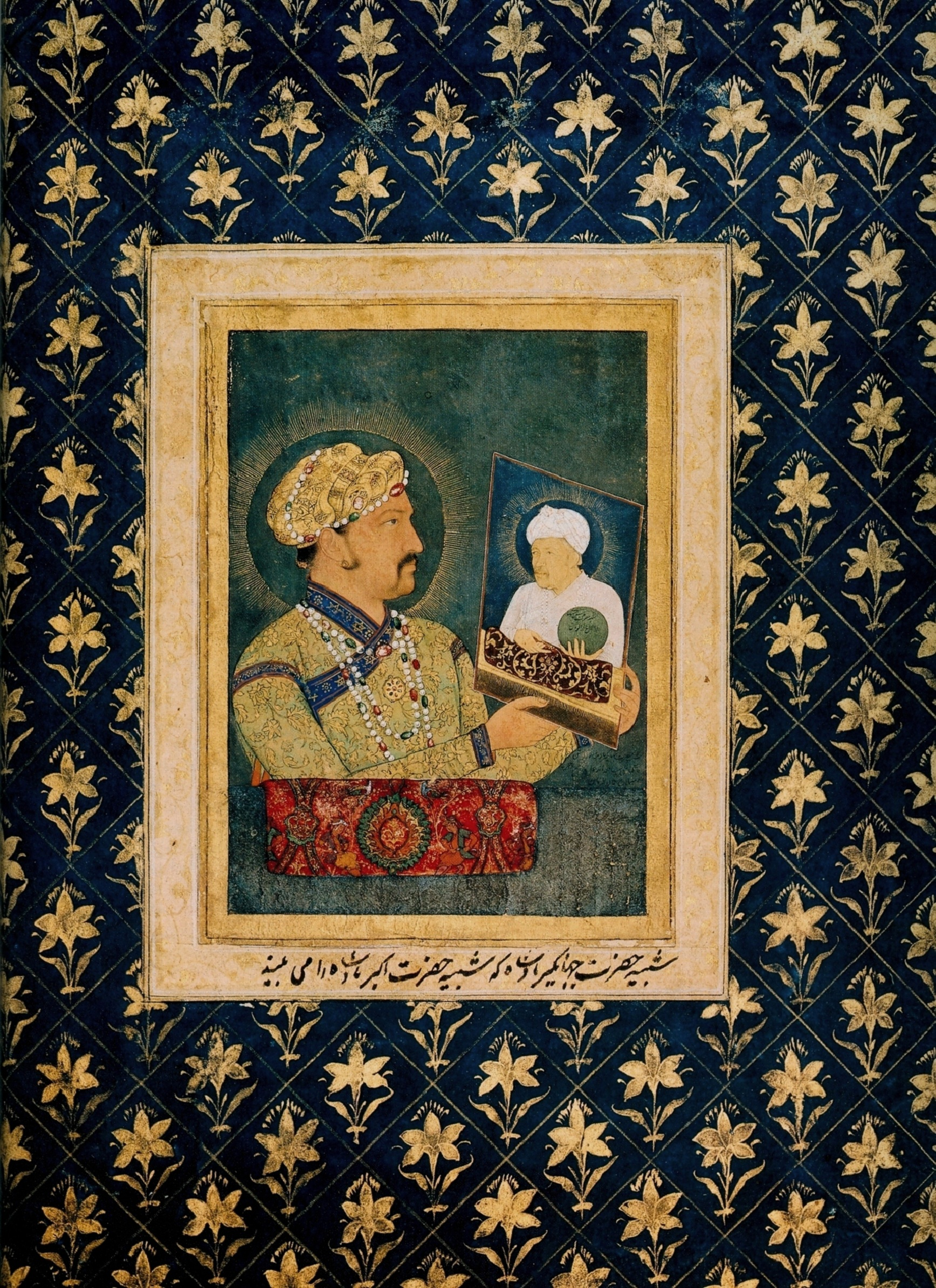
- Artist: Hashim, Abu'l-Hasan
- Year: c. 1599–1614
- Location: Louvre, Paris

Jahangir with a Portrait of Akbar is a Mughal painting, by the artists Hashim and Abu'l Hasan. It was commissioned by the Mughal emperor Jahangir in the early 17th century. It depicts Jahangir, holding a portrait of his father and predecessor Akbar. It is now in the Louvre in Paris within the Department of Islamic Art.

== Background ==
The Mughal emperor Jahangir succeeded his father Akbar in 1605. Prior to his accession, during the final years of the reign of Akbar, Jahangir rebelled against his father and set up an alternative court at Allahabad.

The year of the painting's completion is not exactly known, and various clues point to different dates. It is known from the inscriptions on the painting that the work was executed by two artists, Mir Hashim and Abu'l Hasan. The latter is not referred to by name, but by his title, that is, "Nadir al-Zaman" (wonder of the age). Another inscription states that the portrait of Jahangir was made in his thirtieth year. This would be in 1599, before the accession of Jahangir, and during the reign of Akbar. Yet another inscription states that the depiction of Akbar (d. 1605) is posthumous. Furthermore, the depiction of Jahangir shows him wearing earrings, and he is known to have pierced his ears in 1614. Finally, the title of "Nadir al-Zaman" was conferred upon Abu'l-Hasan before 1614. Kavita Singh therefore speculates that the painting was retouched, with the posthumous image of Akbar added later.

As for the inspiration behind its commissioning, Kavita Singh speculates that it might have been commissioned after a dream of Jahangir, as recounted in his autobiography the Jahangirnama, where his father Akbar appeared in his dream and asked him to forgive Mirza Aziz Koka, a nobleman imprisoned by Jahangir for treason.

== Description ==
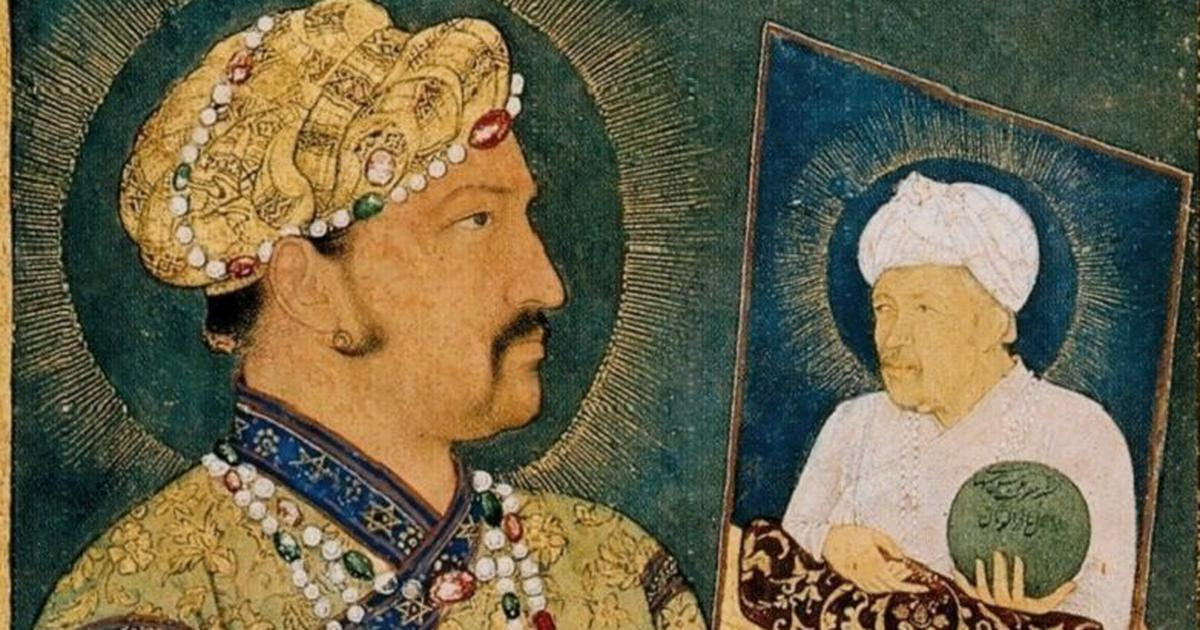
According to Kavita Singh, Jahangir appearing to be listening reverently, as the portrait of Akbar speaks to him.

The principal subject, set against a blue-green background, is the emperor Jahangir. He is holding, with both hands, a portrait of his father and predecessor, the emperor Akbar.

Both emperors have a halo around them, that symbolizes the divine right to rule. Furthermore, Jahangir's familial resemblance to his father reinforces his legitimacy as his father's rightful successor. At the bottom of both portraits are textiles which indicate that both portraits are in the form of jharokha-darshan, a practice where the emperor would appear in a window, so that their subjects might glimpse them. The fact that both emperors are the subject of a jharokha-darshan may symbolize that both emperors are reigning, Jahangir in the current world, and Akbar in the afterlife.

=== Jahangir ===
Jahangir is dressed in a jama made out of golden brocade, with a matching turban. He wears strings of pearls studded with rubies and emeralds. Contrasting with other paintings of Jahangir where he is depicted looking down, here, he holds the painting up with respect, and is looking forward. His body is stiff. Kavita Singh interprets this as Jahangir appearing to be listening reverently, as the portrait of Akbar speaks to him.

A cloth below him is wine-coloured, with an ogive in the middle, with a bird on either side. Two full and two partial human figures are also seen on the cloth. These figures appear central Asian, wearing brightly coloured tunics. This alludes to Jahangir's Central Asian ancestry.

=== Akbar ===
In the portrait, Akbar is dressed in white. This contrasts with Jahangir's lavish attire and is reminiscent of the simple garb worn by Sufi saints. It also symbolizes that the late emperor has transcended the material realm. In his hand, Akbar is holding an orb that is interpreted as a globe, as if he is going to hand it over to Jahangir. The globe represents the right to rule, and is also an allusion to the meaning of "Jahangir", that is, "world-seizer". Upon the globe, an inscription reads, "The portrait of the venerable one who is nesting in paradise, the work of Nadir al-Zaman". This confirms that the depiction of Akbar is posthumous.

== Acquisition history and critical reception ==
The Louvre purchased this painting from Elisa Haughton, along with several other Indian artworks, in 1894.

B. N. Goswamy refers to the painting as "a dazzling work, highly accomplished and quite moving".
