= Jahangir Embracing Shah Abbas =

1610s painting by Abu'l Hasan

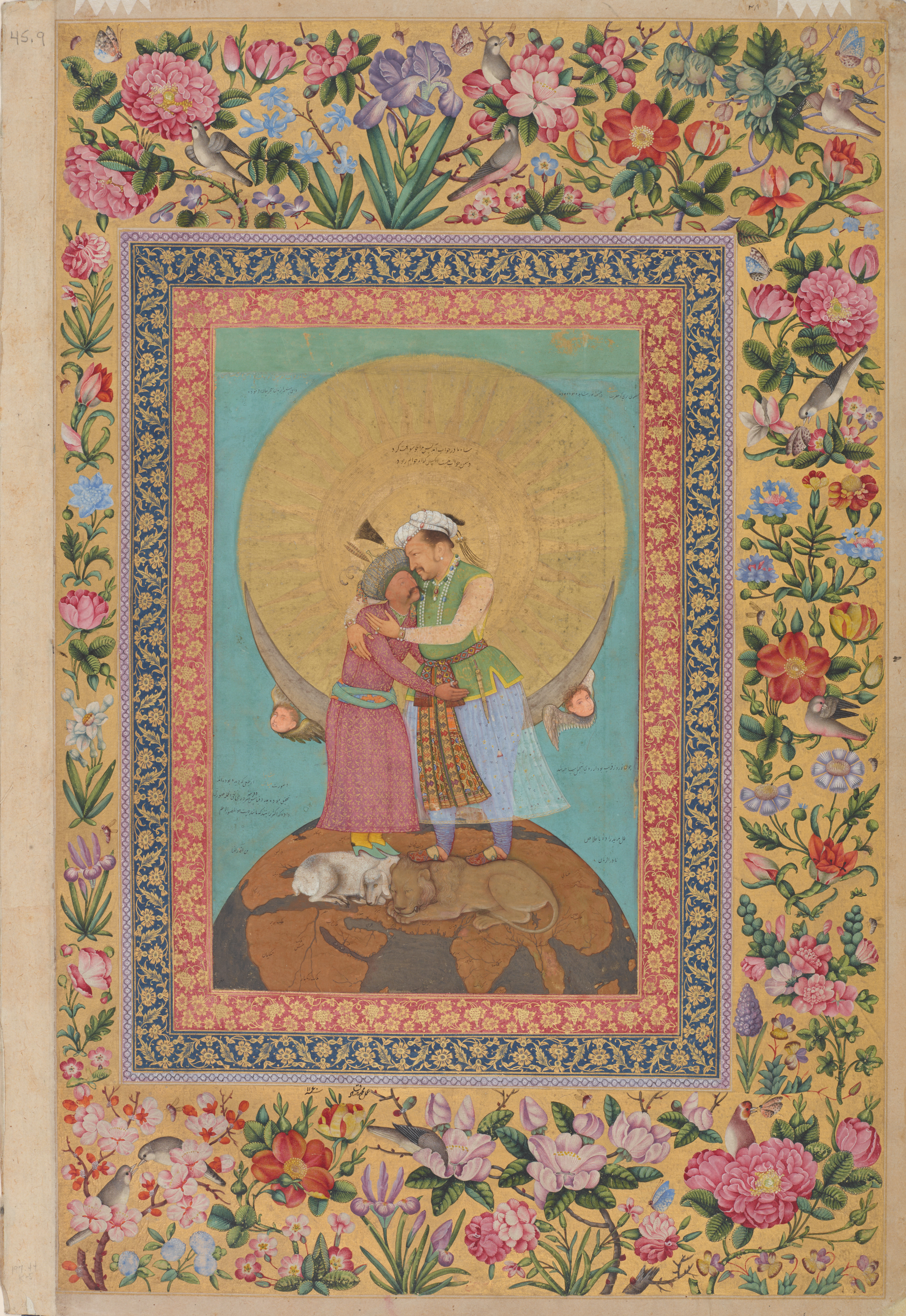
- Artist: Abu'l Hasan
- Year: c. 1618
- Medium: Opaque watercolor, ink, silver, and gold on paper
- Location: Freer Gallery of Art

Jahangir Embracing Shah Abbas is a Mughal painting by the artist Abu'l Hasan. It is now in the Freer Gallery of Art in Washington, D.C. It was commissioned by the Mughal emperor Jahangir. The painting depicts an imaginary scene, where Jahangir is embracing his rival, the Safavid ruler of Iran, Shah Abbas I. Through various iconographical elements, the painting aims to display Jahangir's superiority over his Safavid counterpart.

== History ==
=== Background and commissioning ===
The painting depicts an imaginary scene of the Mughal emperor Jahangir embracing his Safavid counterpart Abbas I. In reality, the two rulers never met. On the painting, an inscription of a couplet, composed by Jahangir himself, speaks of Abbas I having visited him in a dream. This visit is portrayed in this painting by the artist Abu'l Hasan, commissioned by Jahangir. The painting, which serves to display the superiority of Jahangir over Abbas, is representative of Jahangir's anxieties regarding Safavid incursions into Qandahar, a territory disputed between the Safavids and Mughals.

A possible explanation for the commissioning of this work, and other imaginary scenes, such as Jahangir Shooting the head of Malik Ambar, would be that they were attempts to influence the real world through depicting them in the imaginary realm. As it is, Malik Ambar and Abbas I were two of Jahangir's fiercest adversaries, and while the former was depicted dead with Jahangir shooting arrows at his head, Abbas is depicted in a deferential position to the emperor.

=== Provenance ===
The painting remained in the Mughal collection up until Nader Shah's invasion of India (1738/39), when it was looted. It was in the Iranian Imperial Library, up until the 19th century. Subsequently, it appeared on the Iranian art market. It was purchased by the Freer Gallery of Art from Hagop Kevorkian in 1945. It was part of the so-called "St. Petersburg Album", dispersed in Western markets in the 19th century, and mostly ending in the Russian Imperial collections.

== Description ==
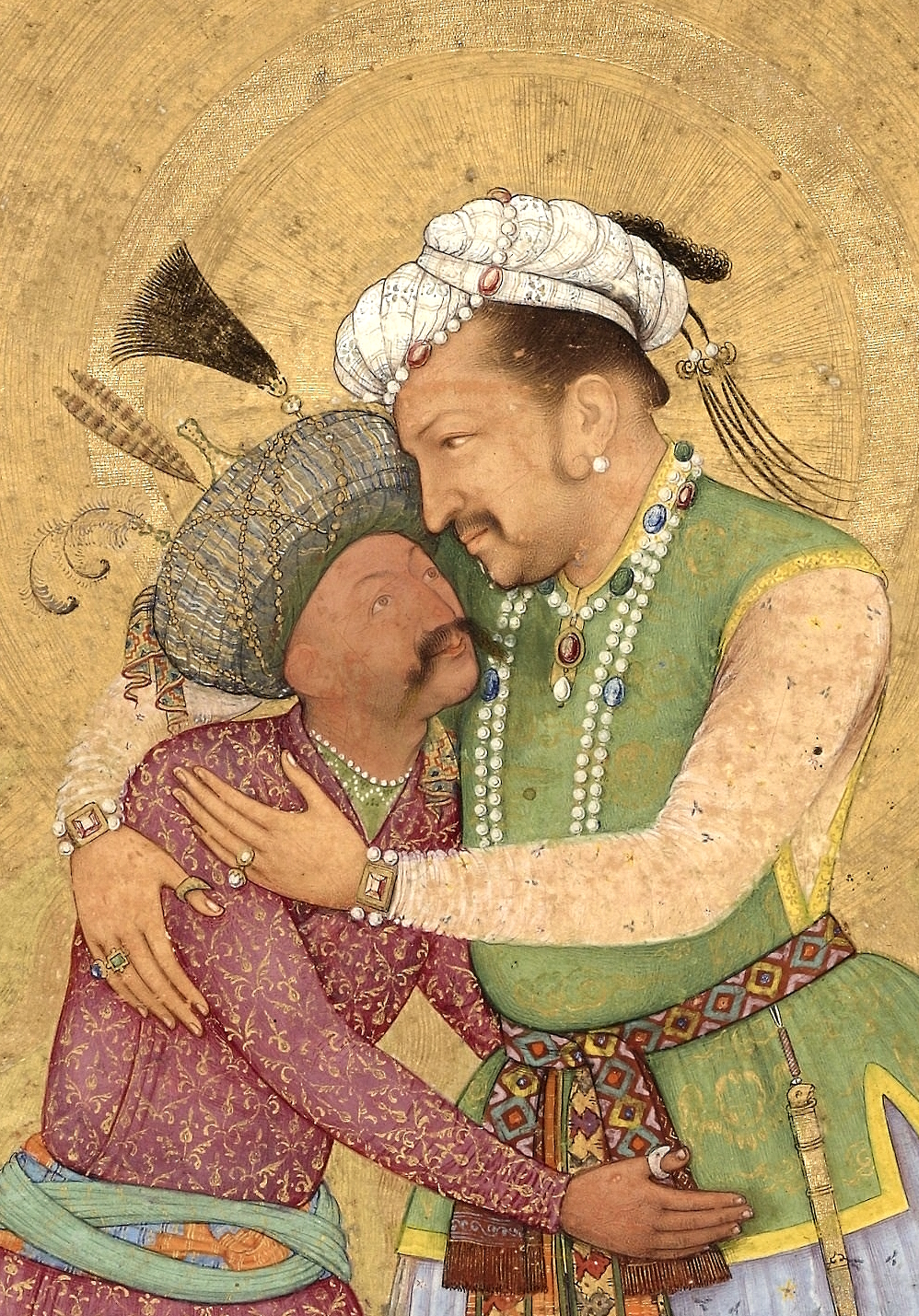
Abbas is depicted to be smaller than Jahangir.

Jahangir is towering over Abbas, who he holds in a "dominant embrace". Abbas is depicted in a submissive, diminutive position, with his thin arms unable to even encircle the much larger emperor. Jahangir is richly dressed, and wears bejeweled ornaments, and has a dagger hanging from his waistband, while Abbas wears no ornaments and is unarmed.

The background consists of a nimbus, that depicts a golden solar orb resting upon a crescent moon. The nimbus is held up by two cherubs. This nimbus represents the concept of farr, that states that a divine illumination is present in worthy kings. The fact that Jahangir and Abbas share the nimbus, indicates the worthiness of both rulers. As was common, the floral border is by a different artist, in this case Muhammad Sadiq.

The lower part of the painting is occupied by a geographically accurate globe, the design of which is most likely based upon European globes that had been brought to the Mughal court by the English diplomat Thomas Roe. The globe was an important motif used in paintings during the reign of Jahangir, with several depictions of the emperor holding, standing upon, or receiving a globe being painted by artists of this period. The globe represents Earthly rule, and alludes to the meaning of "Jahangir", that is, "world-seizer".

A lion and a lamb are placed upon the globe, with Jahangir's feet upon the lion, and Abbas's feet upon the lamb. The motif of the lion and the lamb is a part of traditional imperial iconography, and represents the peace that has been brought about by Jahangir's reign. Each animal occupies, on the globe, the territory of the ruler above them. That is, the lamb rests upon Iran, and the lion upon India. However, the lion occupies all of the border regions, claimed by both emperors, and appears to be nudging the lamb towards Iran. This, again, is not indicative of the reality, and represents Jahangir's growing anxieties about the Persian incursions into the disputed territory.

Another miniature from the album, also in the Freer, shows the two rulers seated together on a divan, at more equal sizes. This is attributed to the painter Bishandas (active 1590–1640).
