= Abu'l-Hasan (artist) =

Mughal miniature painter (1589 – c. 1630)

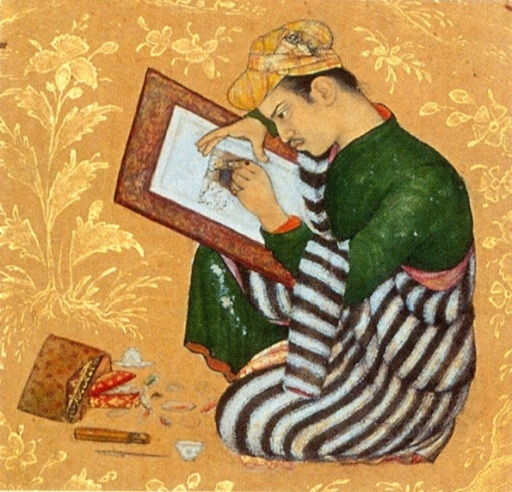
- Portrait of Abu al-Hasan by Daulat from the Gulshan Album (c. 1610)
- Born: 1589; Delhi, Delhi Subah, Mughal Empire
- Died: 1630 (aged 40–41)
- Style: Mughal
- Patrons: Jahangir

Abu'l-Hasan (or Abu al-Hasan; 1589 – c. 1630), from Delhi, India, was a Mughal painter of miniatures during the reign of Jahangir.

== Biography ==
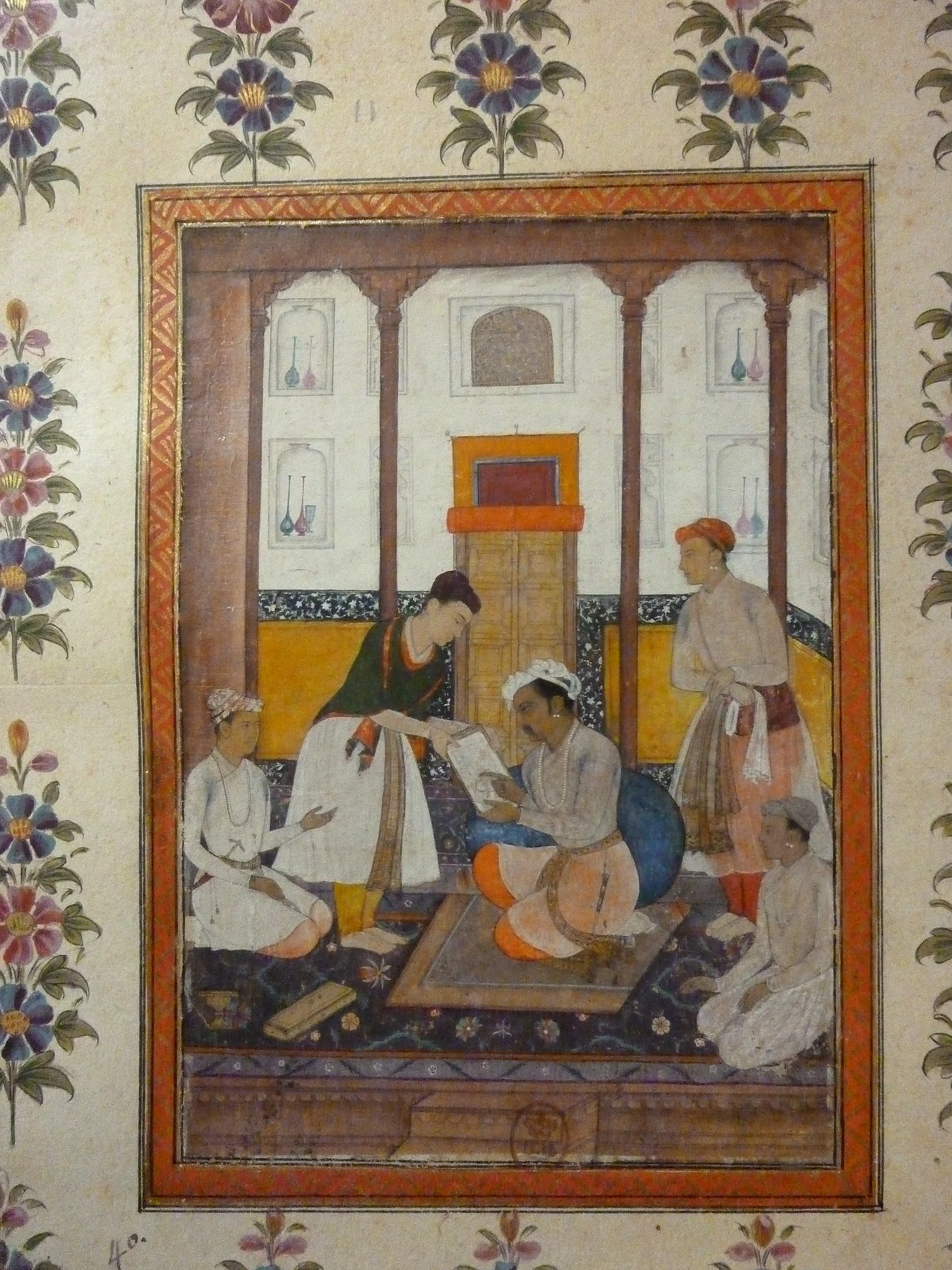
'The Artist Abu’l Hasan Presents a Painting to Prince Salim', by Abu'l-Hasan, Mughal, ca.1600

Abu al-Hasan was the son of Aqa Reza Heravi of Herat in Safavid Iran, a city with an artistic tradition. Aqa Reza was established as an artist and took up employment with Jahangir (r. 1605 –1627) before the latter's accession to the throne of the Mughal Empire. When Abu al-Hasan began producing art, the emperor, Jahangir, appreciated the skills of the boy. In 1599, Abu al-Hasan moved with Jahangir to his newly founded court in Allahabad.

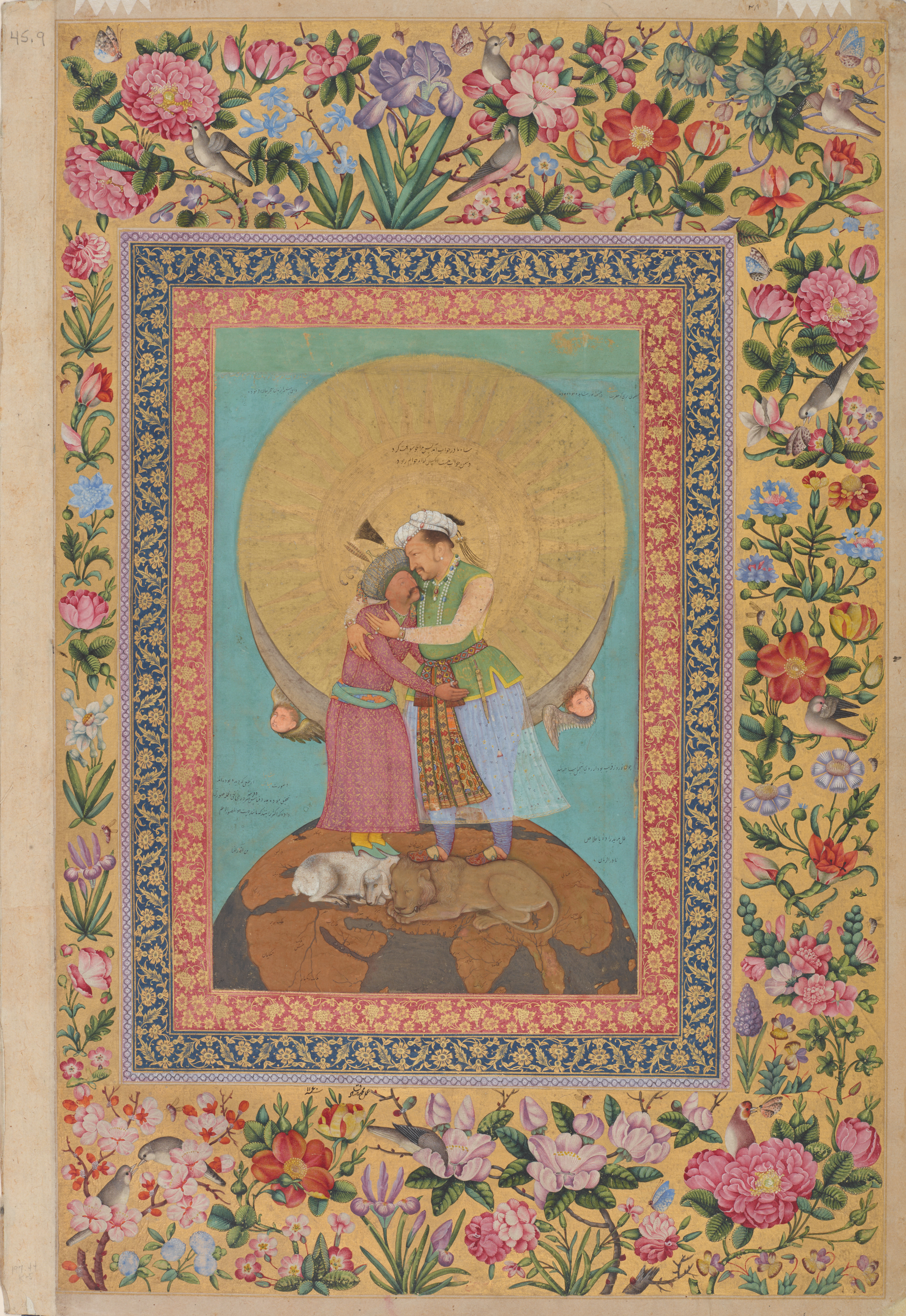
Jahangir Embracing Shah Abbas, c. 1618, Freer Gallery

The emperor considered Abu al-Hasan to be particularly special to him and under his care. This is because although Abu al-Hasan's artwork was similar in many ways to his father's with Dutch and English influence, it was considered to be of a higher quality similar to that of older masters in the field. Jahangir said of Abu al-Hasan that he had no equal and for the work done on the frontispiece for his memoires, the emperor bestowed the title Nadir-uz-Saman ("Wonder of the Age") on Abu al-Hasan in 1618.

Abu al-Hasan's main task was the documentation of events at the imperial court, which resulted in many portraits being completed. Portraits were the hallmark of Jahangir's rule. Not many of Abu al-Hasan's paintings survived, but those that identify him as the artist show that he also worked on a range of subjects, including some everyday scenes and political paintings that showed the emperor and Mughal empire in a positive and powerful light. In addition to original works of art, Abu al-Hasan also retouched other artists' paintings (one such example is below: Dancing Dervishes)

Abu al-Hasan's career aligned with developments in the style of Mughal paintings. However, when Jahangir's reign came to an end, and Shah Jahan began his rule, Abu al-Hasan's career became less active until 1628 from which point on, there is no evidence of him producing art.

=== Works ===
Title	Year	Current location	Notes	Material
Study of Saint John the Evangelist, After Albrecht Dürer	c. 1600 –1601	Metropolitan Museum of Art	Completed by the artist at the age of 13, this is considered an accurate study of Albrecht Durer's (a German artist) original.	Brush drawn ink on paper
Spotted Forktail	c. 1610 –1615	Metropolitan Museum of Art	Portrays a spotted forktail bird, usually found in the Himalayas, caught in a hunt in Jangespur (which is not a known location today) that the emperor demanded be drawn. The gilding along the border decorated with floral motifs, however, was not completed by Abu al-Hasan, but another artist named as Harif by an inscription. Folio from the Shah Jahan Album	Ink, opaque watercolor, and gold on silk
Jahangir Shooting the Head of Malik Ambar	c. 1620	Freer Gallery of Art		Opaque watercolor, ink and gold on paper
Emperor Jahangir Triumphing over Poverty	c. 1620 –1625	Los Angeles County Museum of Art		Opaque watercolor, gold, and ink on paper
Darbar Scene of Jahangir	c. 1615	Freer Gallery of Art	Abu al-Hasan doesn't label the globe, but puts it under Emperor Jahangir's feet and gives the emperor a key to the globe. The inscription reads, "The key of victory over the two worlds is entrusted in his hand".	Opaque watercolor, ink and gold on paper
Jahangir Embracing Shah Abbas (or Allegorical Representation of Emperor Jahangir and Shah 'Abbas of Persia)	c. 1618	Freer Gallery of Art	This political painting was inspired, according to Abu al-Hasan, by a dream. It depicts Jahangir and Abbas in a situation in which Mughal emperor, Jahangir, is in a more powerful position, standing on a lion, embracing the shorter Shah Abbas of Iran (his cousin) who is standing on a small lamb and cannot fully reach around Jahangir's body. In reality the two were enemies vying over territory in Afghanistan and this scene did not actually occur.	Opaque watercolor, ink, silver and gold on paper
The Mughal Emperor Jahangir with Radiant Gold Halo, Holding a Globe	c. 1617	Sotheby's Picture Library, London	Cartographic artifacts, such as the globe in this painting, were regarded as distinguished and could increase the reputation of the owner or holder of such an object. It was as much a symbol of royalty as a crown. This artwork was painted in Mandu. The Persian verses espouse the emperor's greatness in the context of other world empires. In this painting, the globe isn't labeled. This painting's image measures 197 x 128.5 cm and is the largest known Mughal painting.	Gouache with gold on fine cotton
Squirrels in a Plane Tree	c. 1610	British Library	One of the most famous painting associated with Abu al-Hasan's name, Squirrels in a Plane Tree, is a depiction of animal posture and movement. The painting depicts European squirrels unknown in India. The signature on the painting is unclear: Nadir al-Asr ("Miracle of the Age") is the title of Ustad Mansur, not of Abu al-Hasan, but the painting is not in Ustad Mansur's style. It is possible that both painters collaborated on this painting.	Gouache on Paper
Jahangir entertains Abbas	c. 1620	Freer Gallery of Art	Although the scene depicted in this painting never took place, it shows the reception of the Safavid Shah 'Abbas I by the Mughal emperor. Within the painting are many objects and people used to elevate the Mughal court and Emperor Jahangir, such as international imagery and status symbols. One example is the Diana Automaton. This painting became a part of the St. Petersburg album when it, and many other Mughal artworks, were seized by Nader Shah in 1739.	Opaque watercolor, gold and ink on paper
Jahangir as the Queller of Rebellion	c. 1623		Jahangir with a halo around his head, holds a globe with a royal seal on it while dressed in a Mughal outfit. The painting portrays the emperor after he successfully put an end to a rebellion led by one of his sons, Prince Shah Jahan. Was in an exhibition held at the Metropolitan Museum, October 21, 1987 – February 14, 1988.	
Dancing Dervishes	c. 1610		This painting is attributed to Aqa-Miraq (mid-sixteenth century) but was painted over, most likely, by Abu al-Hasan (c. 1610). It portrays a Mevlevi Sema' Ceremony, an event filled with music, dance, and ritual. Was in an exhibition held at the Metropolitan Museum, October 21, 1987 – February 14, 1988	Ink, opaque watercolor, and gold on paper

== Gallery ==
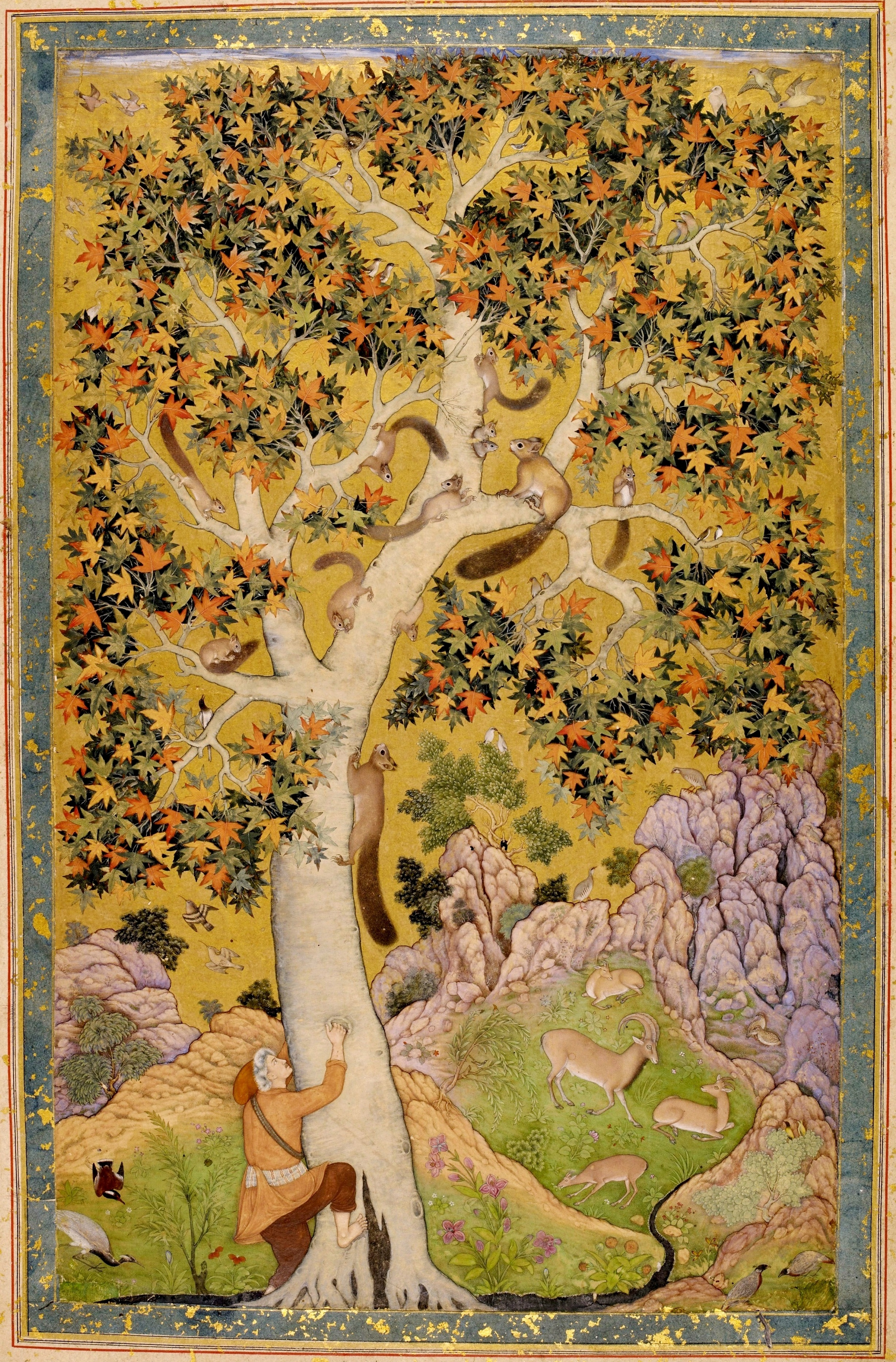
Squirrels in a Plane Tree (c. 1610).

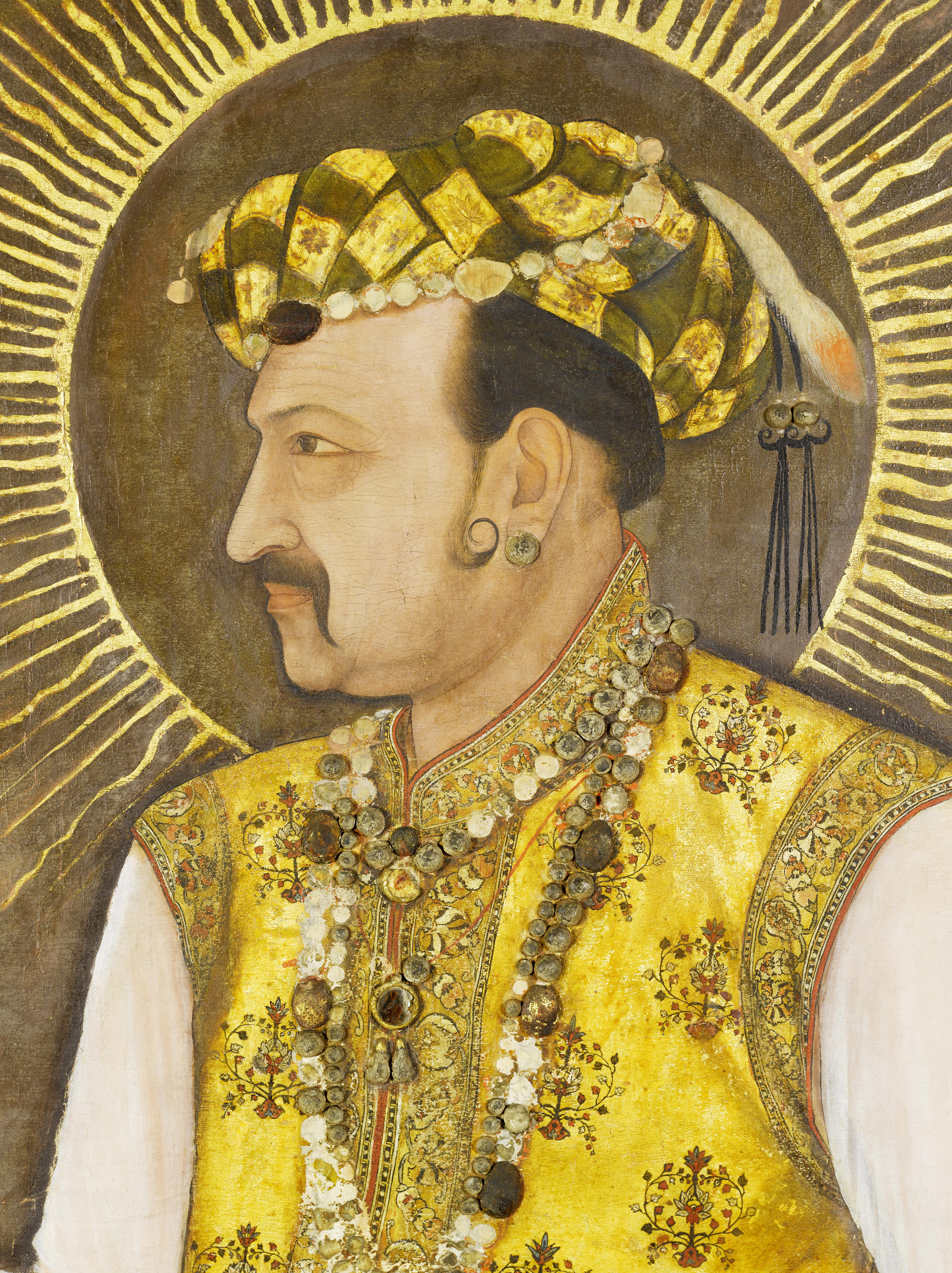
Portrait of Jahangir (detail) by Abu al-Hasan, 1617.

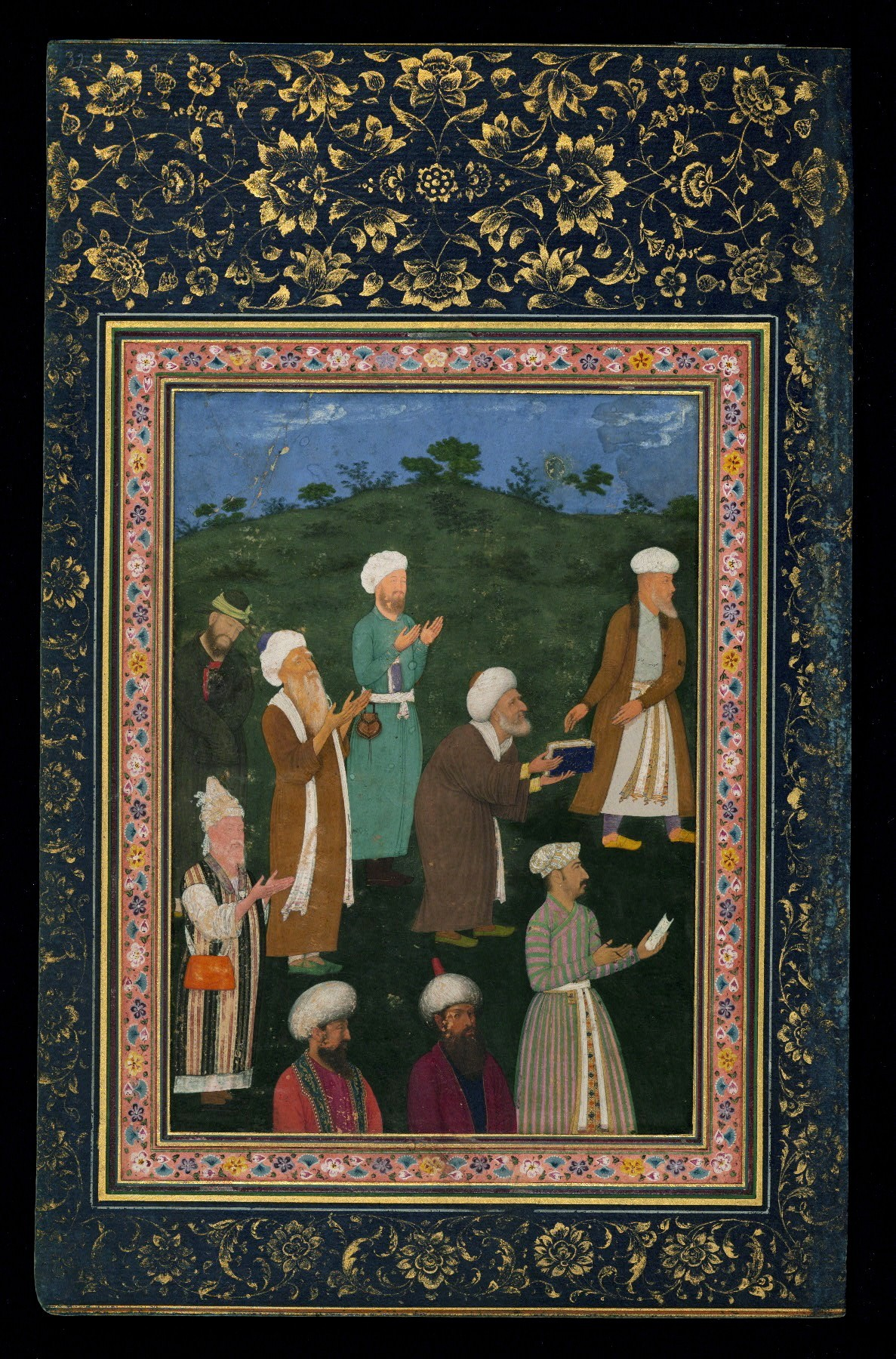
Saʿdī presents a book of his poems, 1615, Walters Art Museum.

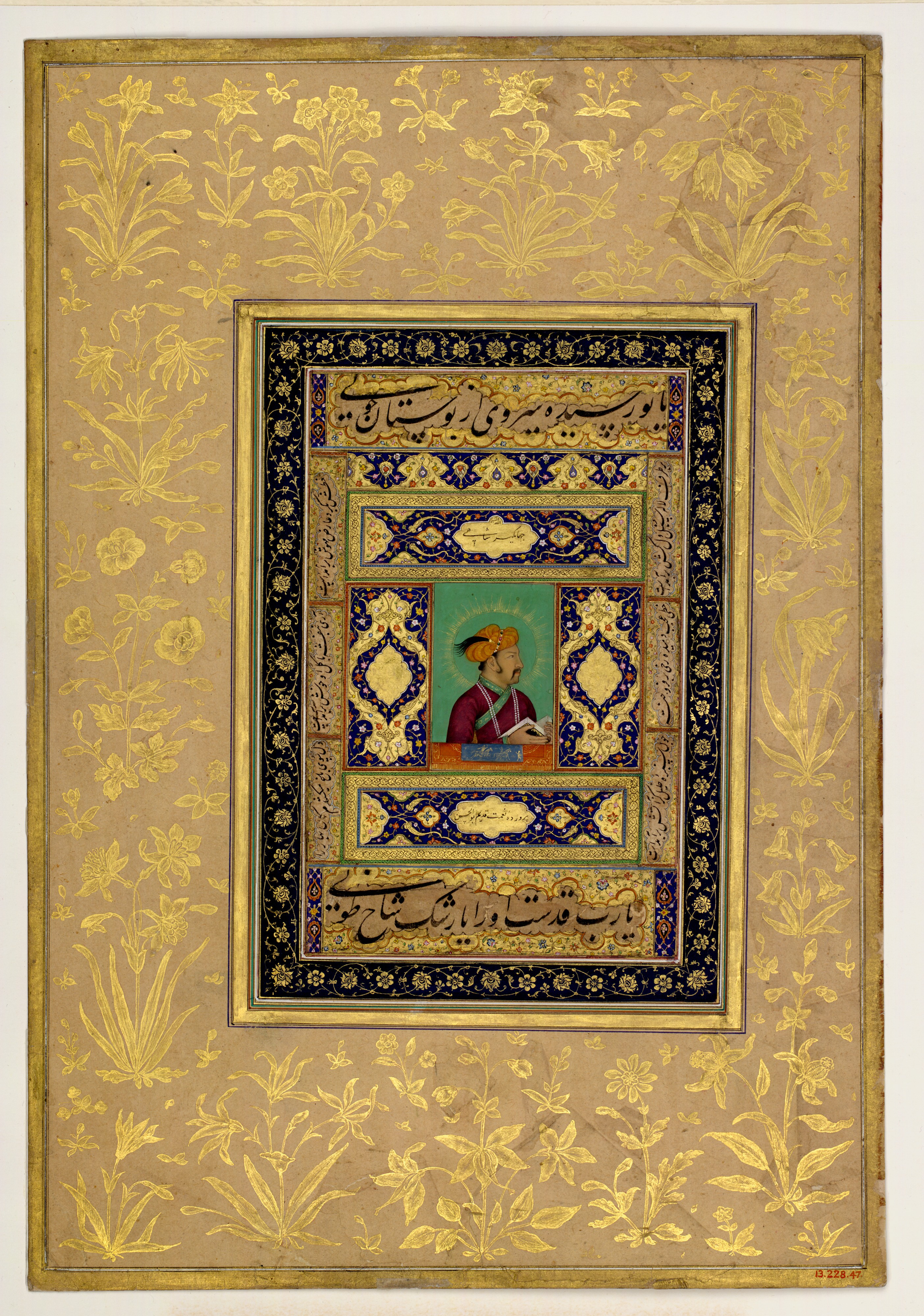
Portrait of Jahangir, 1615–1620, Metropolitan Museum of Art.

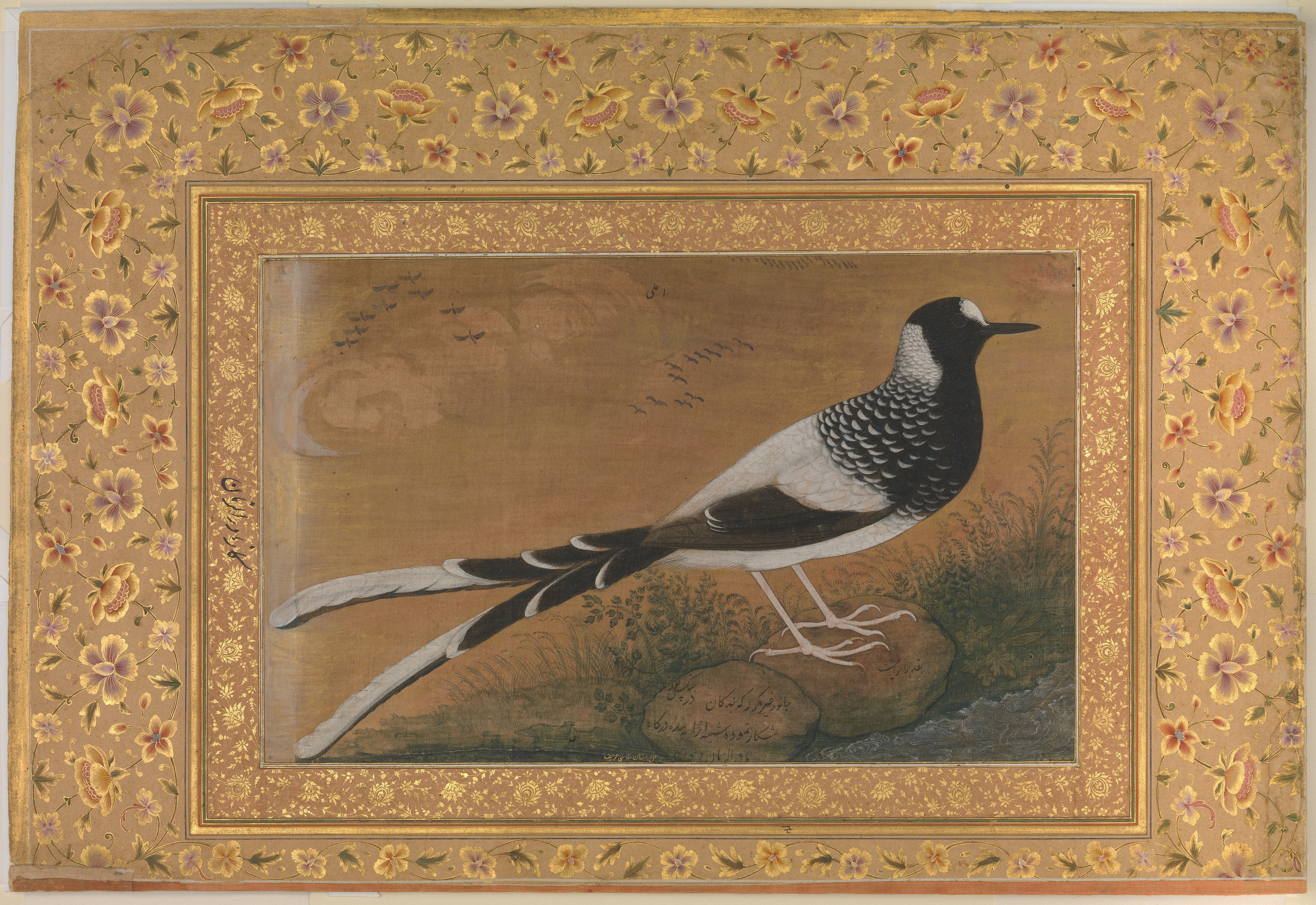
Spotted Forktail, Folio from the Shah Jahan Album, c. 1610–1615, Metropolitan Museum.

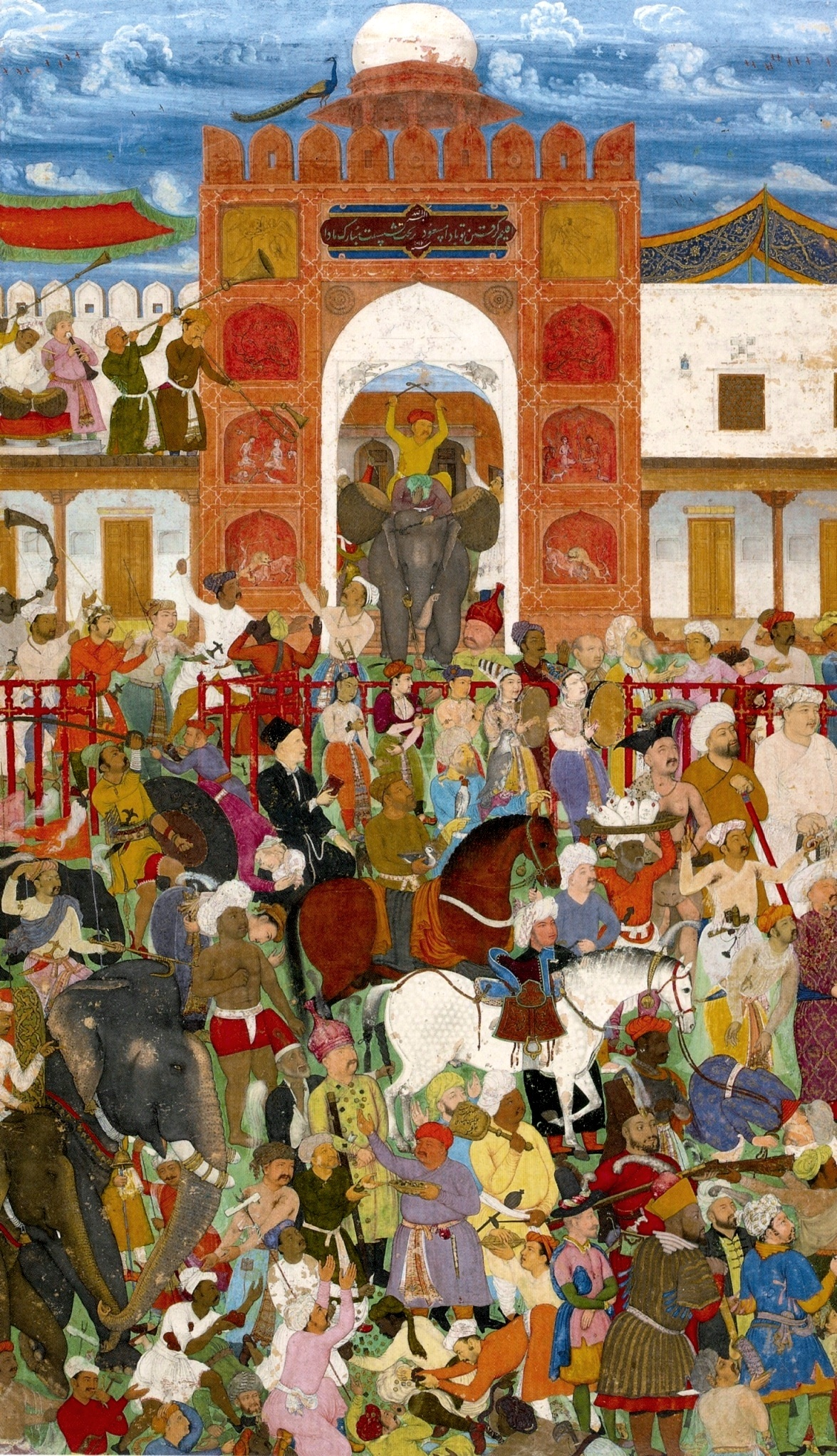
Celebrations at the accession of Jahangir. Jahangirnama. St. Petersburg Album, c. 1615–1618, Institute of Oriental Manuscripts of the Russian Academy of Sciences.

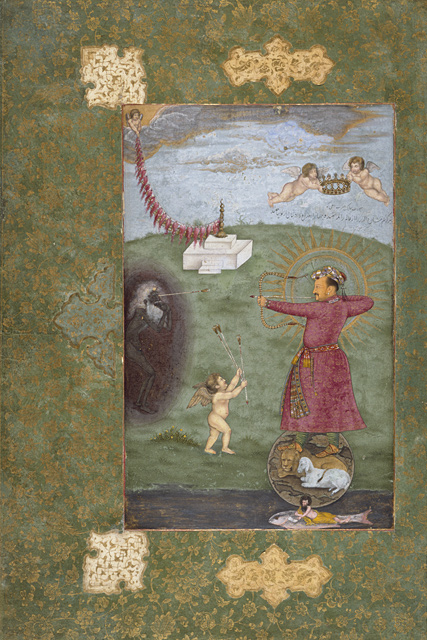
Emperor Jahangir Triumphing over Poverty, attributed to Abu'l Hasan, c. 1620–1625. Opaque watercolor, gold, and ink on page, 23.81 x 15.24 cm.

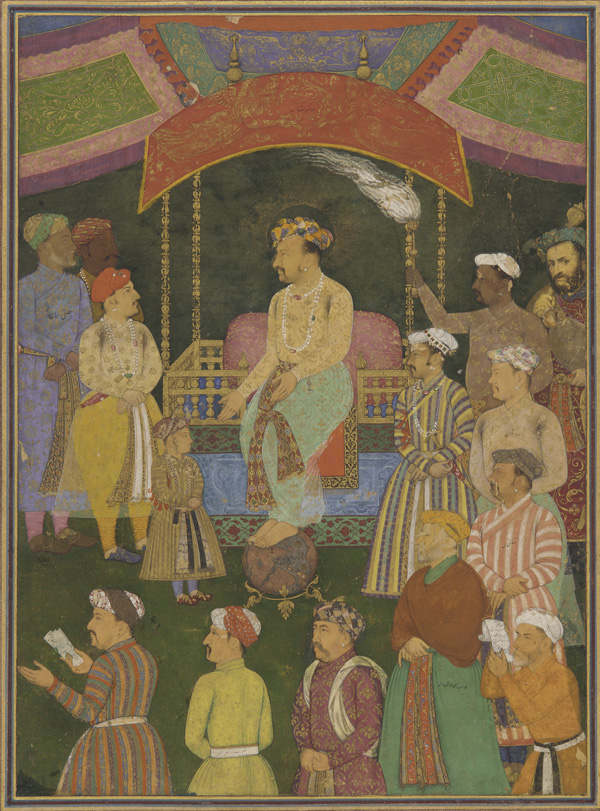
Durbar Scene of Jahangir. Painted by Abu'l Hasan, ca. 1615. Opaque water color, gold, and ink on paper, 16.9 x 12.3 cm. Freer Gallery of Art, Smithsonian Institution, Washington, D.C., purchase F1946.28.

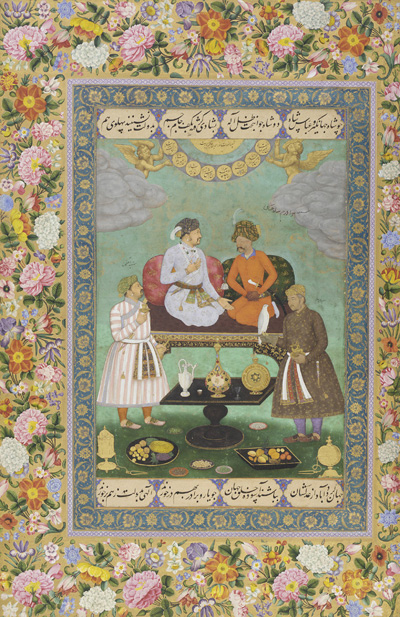
Abu'l Hasan, Jahangir Entertains Shah Abbas, c. 1620. Washington, DC: Freer and Sackler Galleries.

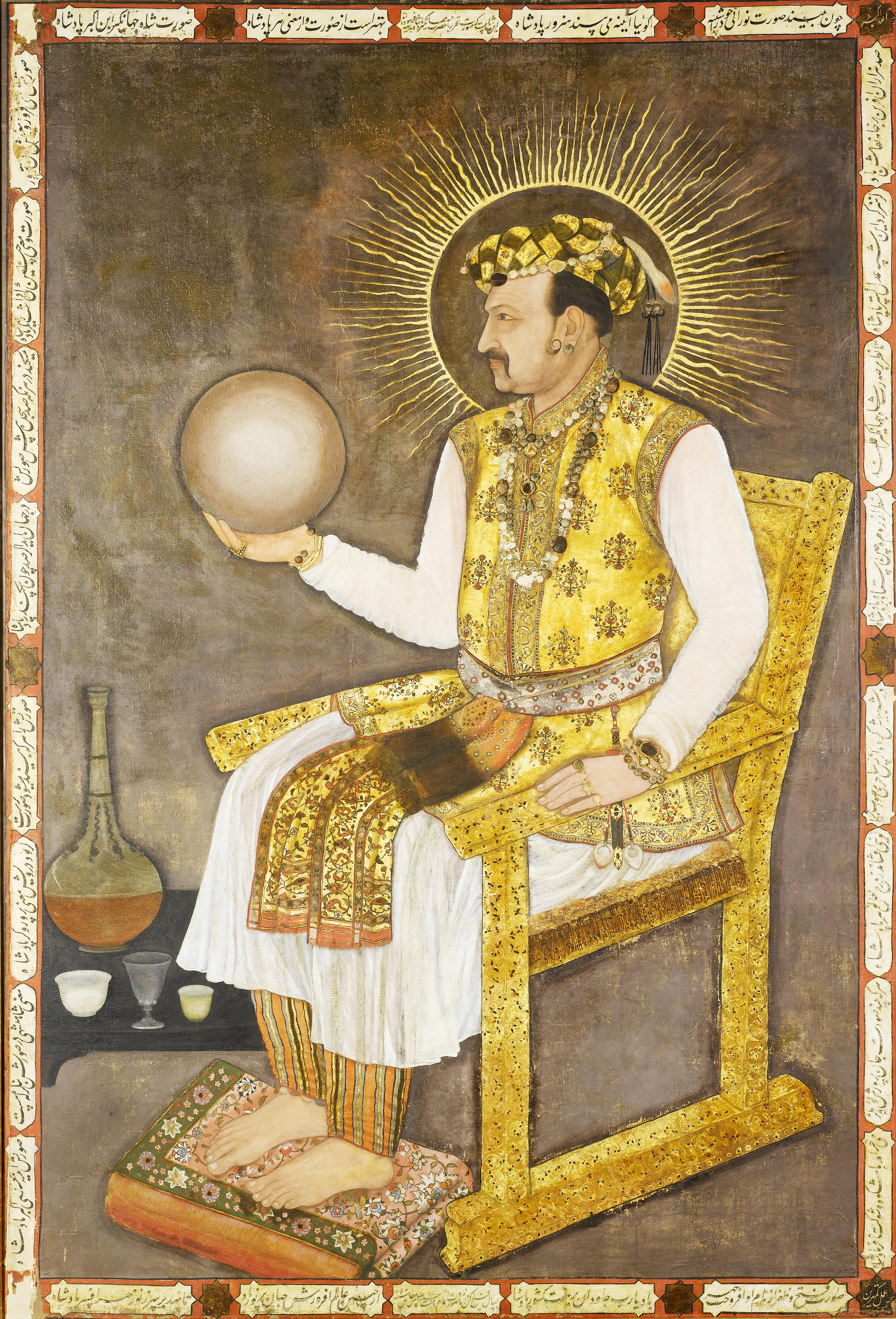
The Mughal Emperor Jahangir with Radiant Gold Halo, Holding a Globe (c. 1617). The largest known Mughal portrait depicting Emperor Jahangir. Attributed to Abu'l Hasan, Nadir al-Zaman painted at Mandu.

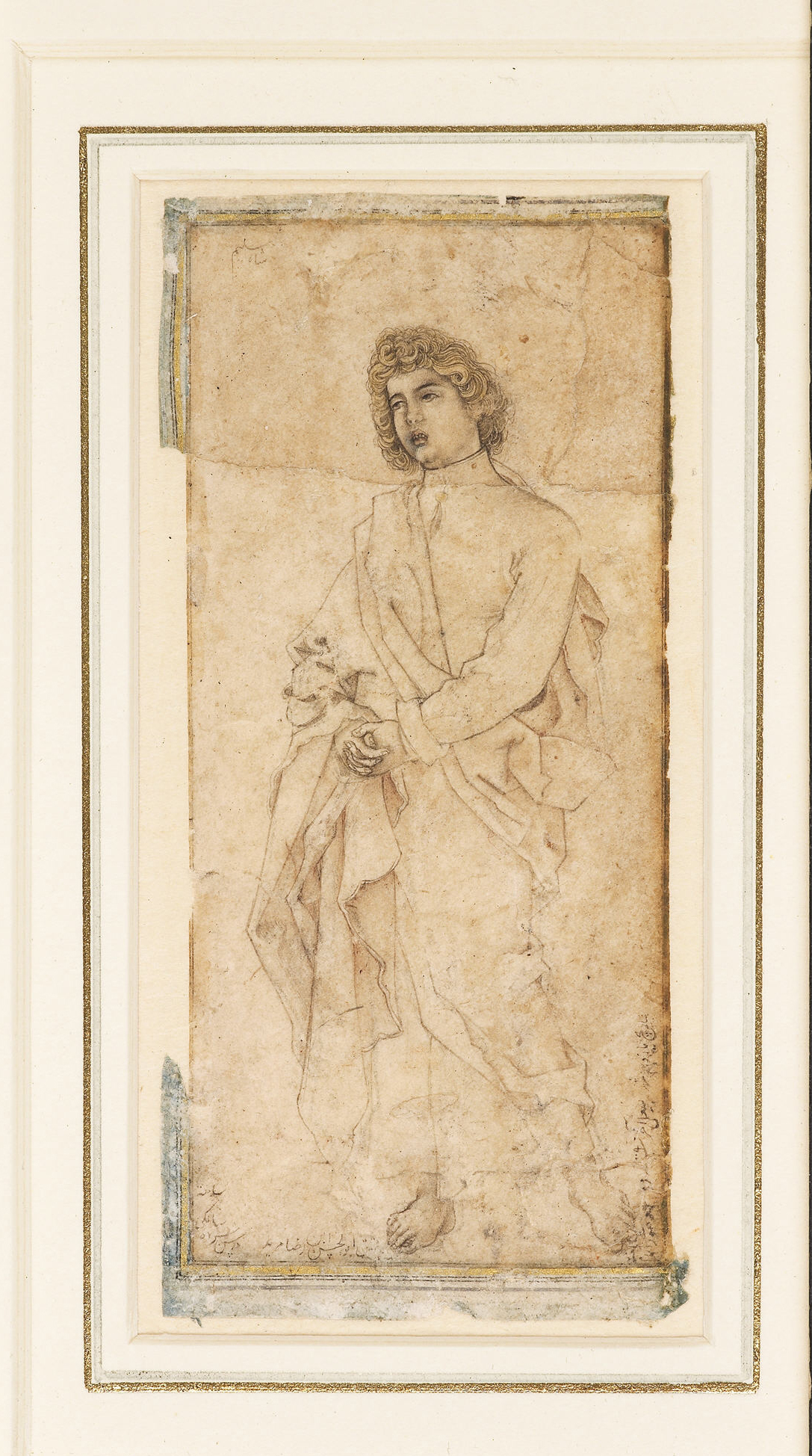
Abu'l Hasan. Study of St. John Evangelist adapted from Durer's Crucifixion engraving of 1511. Dated 1600 –1601, The Ashmolean Museum, Oxford.

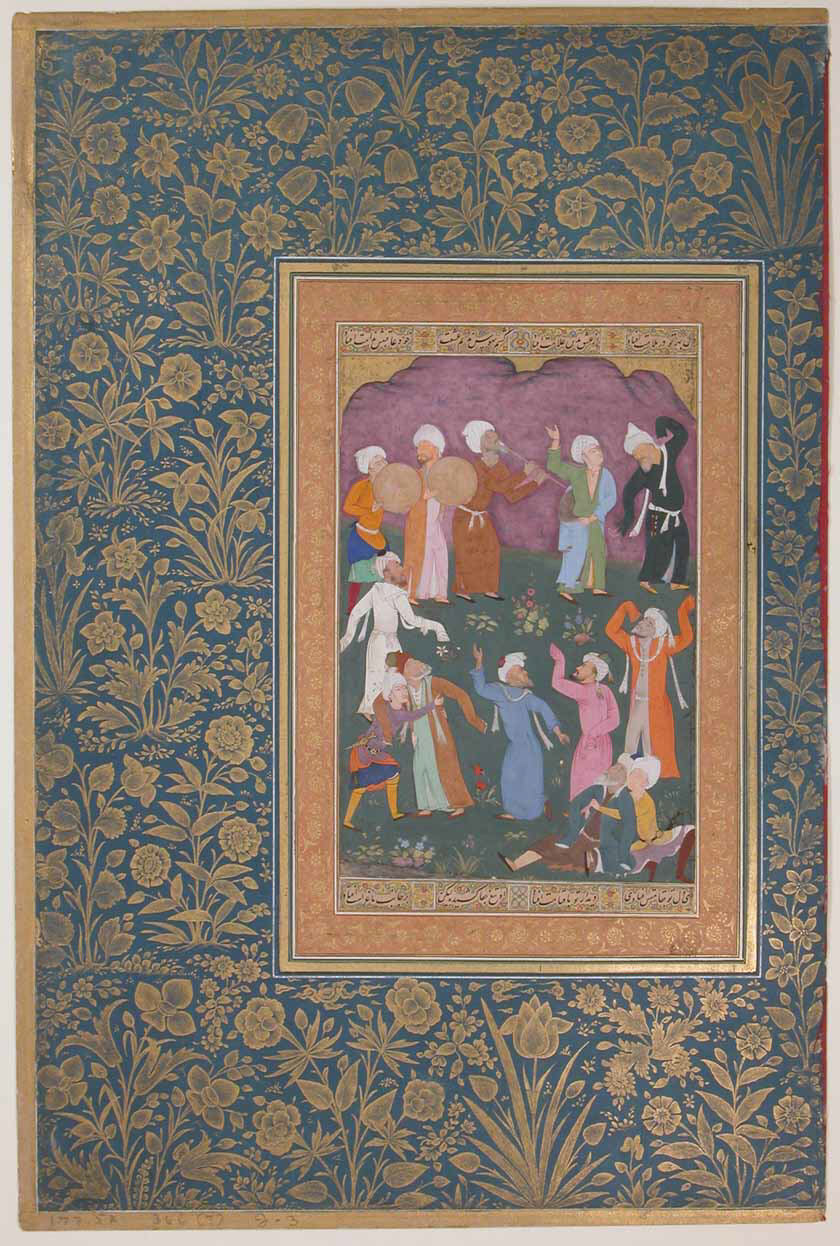
"Dancing Dervishes", Folio from the Shah Jahan Album. Originally by Aqa Mirak, retouched by Abu'l Hasan.
