= Murad Khan Mumtaz =

Pakistani-American artist and art historian

- Born: Lahore, Pakistan

Academic background
- Education: Columbia University (MFA); University of Virginia (PhD)

Academic work
- Institutions: Williams College

Murad Khan Mumtaz is a Pakistani-American artist and art historian. Born in Lahore, Pakistan to an architect father, Mumtaz started studying traditional Indian miniature painting in 2001 at the National College of Arts, then the only institution in the world to offer a BFA degree in the subject. He graduated with his bachelor's degree in 2004. In an interview, he stated that the technique taught at the National College was "an attenuated technique that had been significantly altered during the colonial period". Following his bachelor's, he was taught the Pahari style by an artist who had learnt from traditional Indian artists.

He completed his M.F.A. from Columbia University in 2010, where he was a Fulbright scholar. He went on to obtain a Ph.D. in Art and Architectural History from the University of Virginia in 2018. By 2021, he had married fellow artist Alyssa Pheobus Mumtaz, with whom he has two children. He published a book in 2023 entitled "Faces of God: Images of Devotion in Indo-Muslim Painting 1500-1800". As of 2024, he works as an assistant professor of art at Williams College.

Mumtaz paints in the traditional Indian miniature style. His earlier works were more experimental and focused on "modernising" the traditional style. For instance, one of his earlier works involved grafting scenes onto banknotes of the US dollar using the Indian miniature technique. After joining his PhD program, he began to use authentic materials and techniques. This includes using traditional pigments such as vermillion, indigo, etc., and squirrel-tail-hair brushes. He imports the hand-made wasli paper from Indian artisans. His subjects include Hindu gods and demons.
