= Jahangir Shooting the Head of Malik Ambar =

Mughal painting (c. 1620)

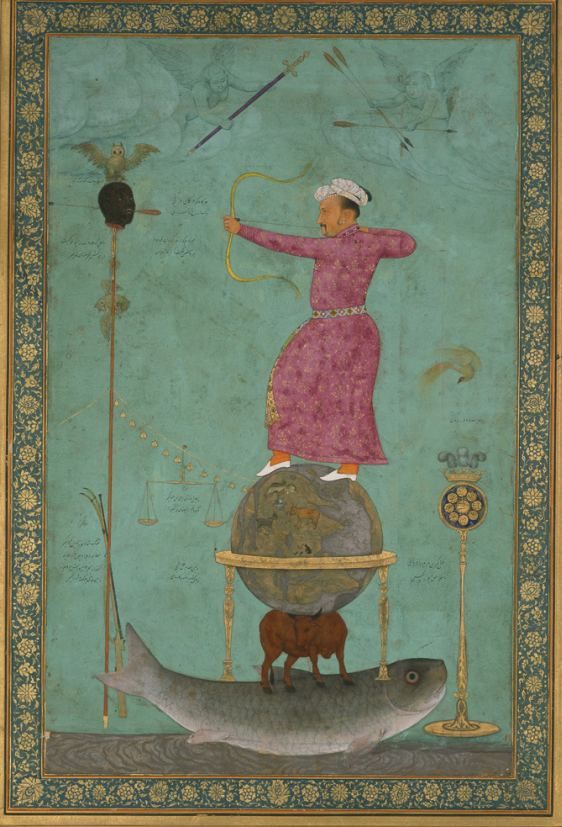
- Artist: Abu'l-Hasan
- Year: c. 1620
- Movement: Mughal
- Dimensions: 25.8 × 16.5 cm

Jahangir Shooting the Head of Malik Ambar is a Mughal painting by the artist Abu'l-Hasan. It is located in the Chester Beatty Library.

== Background ==
Malik Ambar was the regent of the Ahmednagar Sultanate. The Mughal emperor Jahangir fought a long campaign to conquer Ahmednagar, but could not achieve this goal due to fierce resistance from Ambar's forces.

Jahangir Shooting the Head of Malik Ambar is part of a series of allegorical paintings commissioned by Jahangir, around 1616–18, executed by eminent painters of the Mughal court. These display a wide variety of motifs drawn from Islamic, Hindu, and Christian iconographies, and serve to reflect the inner psyche of their patron.

Another theory suggests that it was painted on the occasion of Ambar's death in 1626.

== Description ==
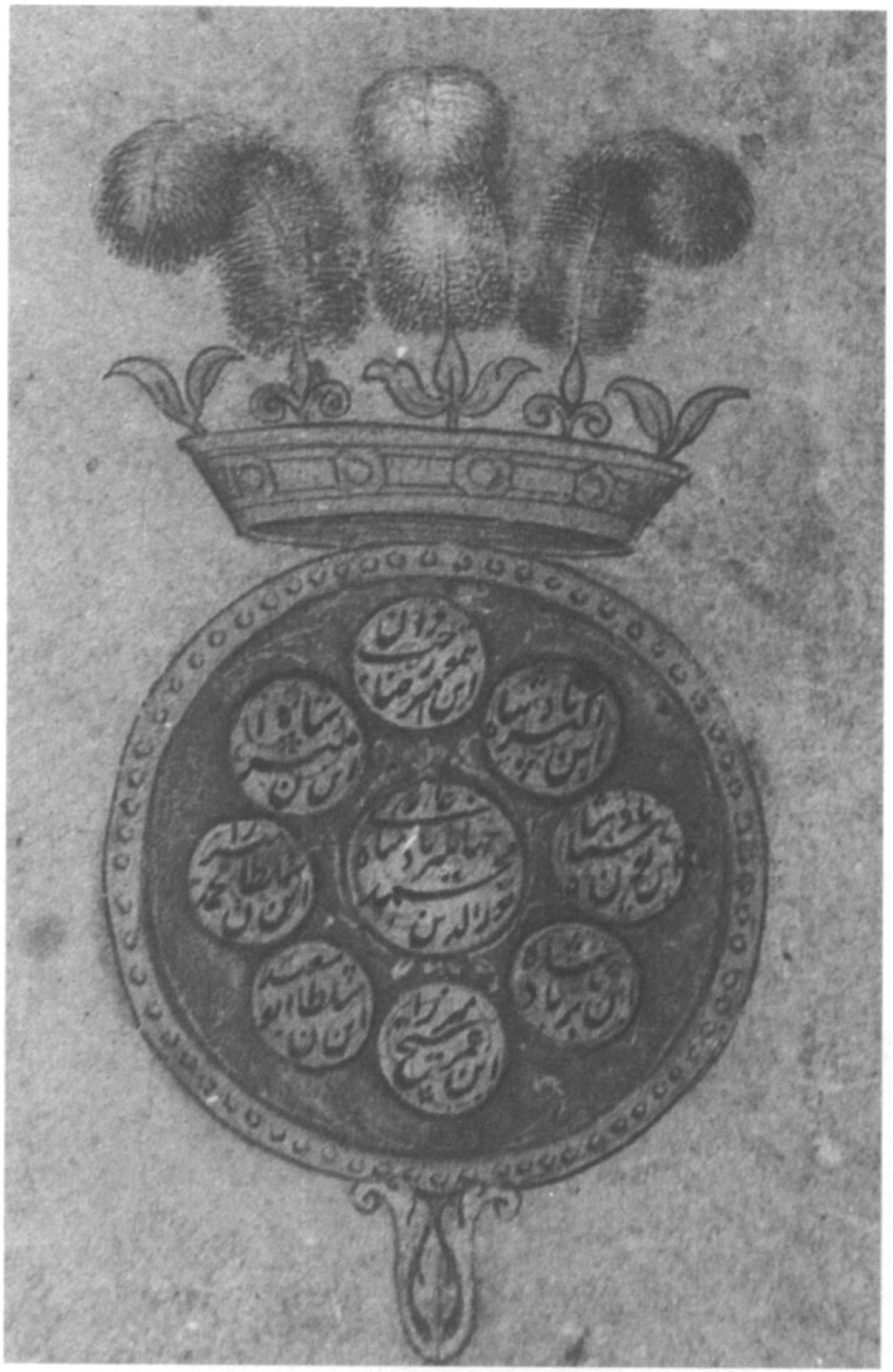
Jahangir's seal, containing his titles and genealogy.

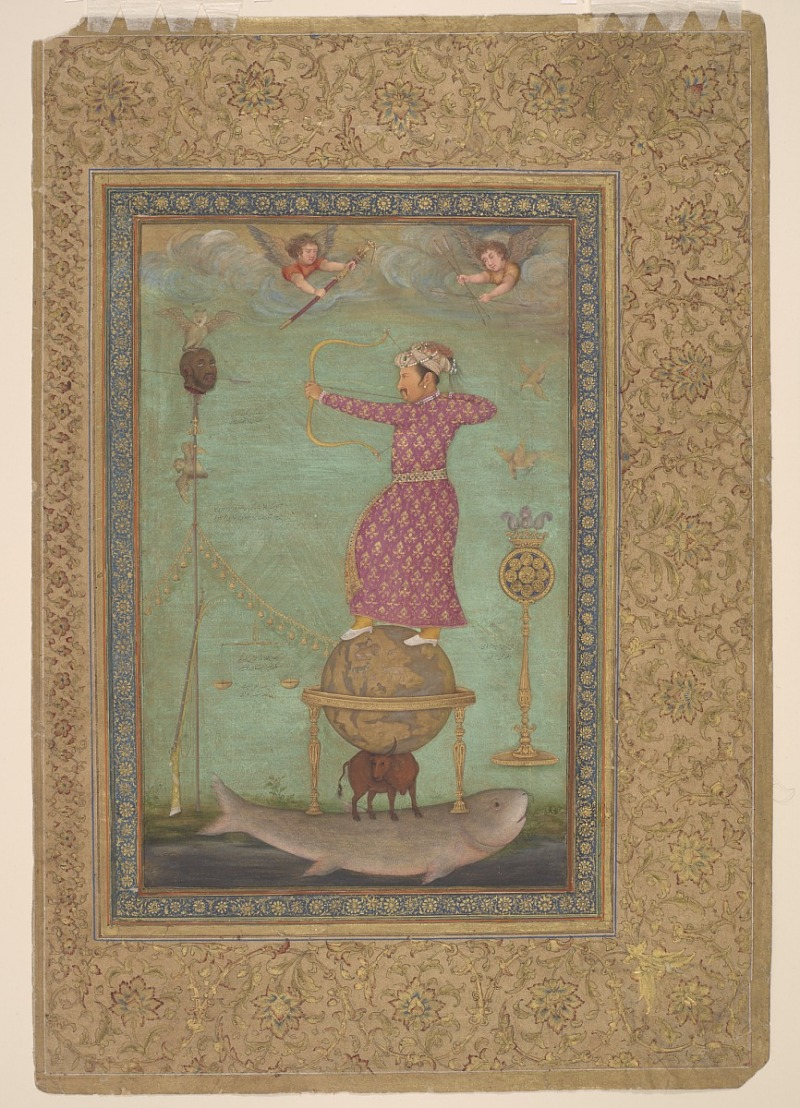
The version in the Smithsonian, considered to be a later copy.

The principal subject is Jahangir, shooting a second arrow through the severed head of Malik Ambar, impaled upon a javelin. He stands upon a globe, featuring India at the center. This is a reference to his regnal title Jahangir (literally "world seizer"). A lion and a goat are represented on the globe, depicting the "dad u dam" (transl. "beast and prey") theme. The globe is situated upon the horns of a cow, which in turn is standing on a fish. The cow and fish are both Islamic symbols of kingship. Jahangir being on top of this group of objects thus symbolizes his status as the sovereign of the material and spiritual realms.

To the right is a golden stand, on which is a disk containing the seal of Jahangir, surmounted by a plumed crown. On the seal are the full titles of Jahangir, and his genealogy tracing back to Timur. A bird of paradise flies above this stand.

To the left is the severed head of Malik Ambar, with an open mouth and eyes rolled back, is depicted without a turban, and thus a disrespectful portrayal. One arrow has already struck the head. An owl is perched on top of the head. The owl, in Islamic symbology, is an inauspicious bird and a symbol of death, and Jahangir reportedly asked for its inclusion himself. The dead mate of this bird hangs from the javelin, below the severed head. A chain with bells connects the javelin to the globe, with a scale suspended from it. This chain is the zanjir-i adal (chain of justice), placed in the Mughal capital, where any subject might ring it seeking the emperor's justice. Jahangir's musket is also depicted, resting by the javelin.

The following text is inscribed below the scale: "Through the justice of Shah Nur al-Din Jahangir, the lion has sipped milk from the teat of the goat".

== Other versions ==
Another version, considered to be a later copy painted in the 19th century, exists in the Smithsonian.
