= Darbar of Aurangzeb =

17th-century Mughal painting

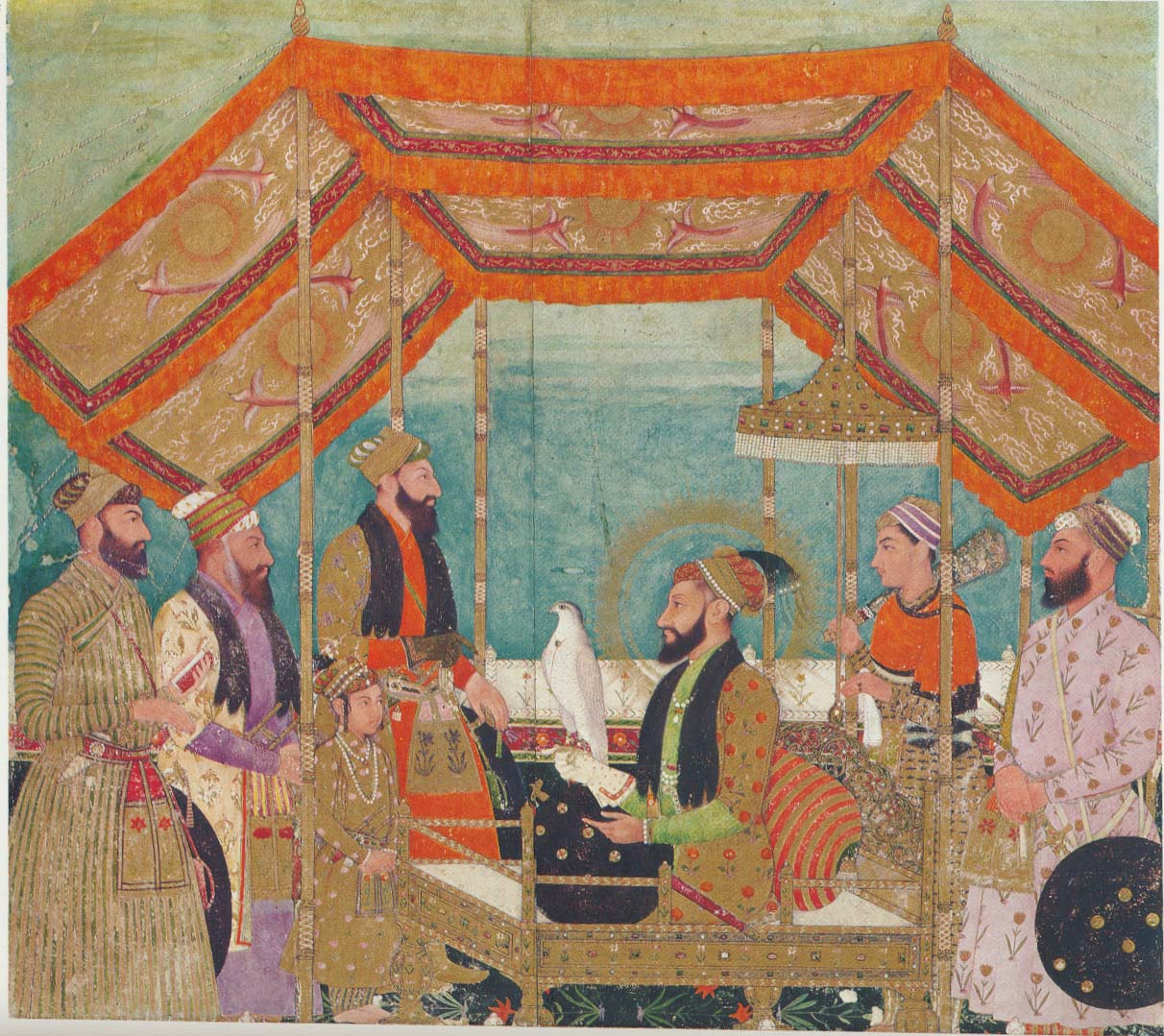
- Medium: Opaque watercolor with gold on paper
- Dimensions: 19.1 cm × 21.4 cm (7.5 in × 8.4 in)
- Location: Museum of Islamic Art, Doha

Darbar of Aurangzeb is a 17th-century Mughal painting. It depicts the Mughal emperor Aurangzeb holding court under a canopy.

== Background ==
The painting is referred to by many names, including Darbar of Aurangzeb, Darbar of 'Alamgir, Aurangzeb with his third son, Sultan Azam, and 'Alamgir Enthroned.

Various dates have been proposed by scholars for the work's composition. Earlier hypotheses by Stuart Cary Welch and Milo C. Beach date the painting to around 1660. In these interpretations, the boy in front of the emperor is identified as his son, Azam Shah (b. 1653).

Later scholarship has disagreed with this interpretation. John Seyller dates the work to c. 1681-82. He argues that in Mughal painting, the status of the figures present corresponds to their proximity to the emperor. As such, he argues that Azam Shah must be the adult figure closest to the emperor. The boy in front of the emperor is identified by him as Bidar Bakht, the eldest son of Azam Shah and the favourite grandson of the emperor.

The attribution of this painting has also been disagreed upon, with scholars variously attributing it to Bichitr, Hashim, and Ilyas Bahadur.

== Description ==
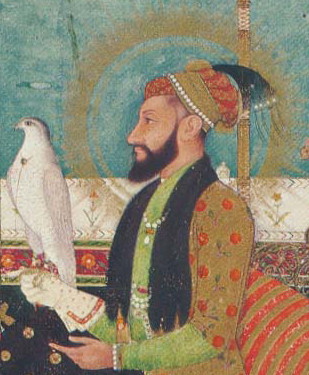
Aurangzeb is holding a bird.

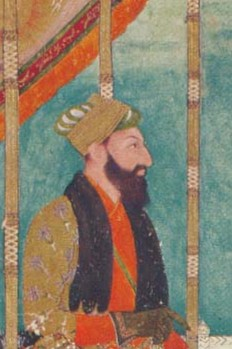
Azam Shah is wearing a gauntlet, as if prepared to receive the bird from his father.

This durbar (also anglicized as darbar) scene takes place under a canopy, against a blue-sky background. The emperor Aurangzeb is seated upon a golden throne, studded with jewels. Behind him is a striped bolster. He is holding a bird, variously identified as a hawk or a falcon. He has with him a shield and a sword. These, along with his trained bird-of-prey, emphasize his martial prowess. The 63-year-old emperor is the only figure to display no signs of aging.

The figure closest to the emperor, identified as Azam Shah, is wearing a vest made out of golden brocade. He wears a falconer's gauntlet, as if preparing to receive the bird from the emperor. This is a metaphor, symbolizing Azam Shah's status as heir apparent. The presence of Azam Shah's son Bidar Bakht before the emperor also points to his elevated status. The boy's liveliness contrasts with the formal portrayal of the other figures.

To the left of Azam Shah is his elder brother Mu'azzam, who has a characteristic white streak in his beard. Finally, at the far left is Shaista Khan, an important nobleman and uncle to the emperor.

Behind the emperor's throne is the prince Muhammad Kam Bakhsh. Holding a fly-whisk, he is depicted as an adolescent, with a hint of a moustache forming above his lips. On the far right is Ashraf Khan, a nobleman who served as paymaster general.

== Reception ==
Stuart Cary Welch calls the work "of stunning quality", and notes that despite Aurangzeb's aversion to art as a result of his religiosity, some of the best Mughal paintings were made during his reign. John Seyller says that the painting has become "the iconic image of Alamgir and his reign".
