= Nainsukh (film) =

- Poster from the Venice Film Festival
- Directed by: Amit Dutta
- Screenplay by: Ayswarya Sankarnarayanan; Amit Dutta
- Based on: Nainsukh of Guler by B.N. Goswamy
- Produced by: Eberhard Fischer; Dhananjai Singh; Varun Dutta
- Starring: Manish Soni; Nitin Goel; K. Rajesh; Shriniwas Joshi
- Cinematography: Mrinal Desai
- Edited by: Samarth Dixit; Amit Dutta; Ujjwal Chandra
- Music by: Dishari Chakraborty
- Release date: 8 September 2010 (Venice)
- Running time: 90 minutes
- Countries: India; Switzerland
- Language: Kangri

Nainsukh is a 2010 film directed by Amit Dutta based on the life and works of Nainsukh, an 18th-century Indian miniature painter. The film contains meticulous recreations of Nainsukh's paintings through compositions set amidst the ruins and environs of the Jasrota palace where the artist was retained.

== Cast ==
- Manish Soni as Nainsukh
- Nitin Goel as Raja Balwant Singh

== Release ==
The film premiered at the 67th Venice International Film Festival, where it was received by Film Comment as one of top 10 films shown. Its North American premiere was at the San Francisco International Film Festival of 2011.

== Reception ==
Nainsukh has received a great deal of appreciation from both film and art critics, with one writing, "The images of Nainsukh are stunning. The comparisons with the paintings could not be more clear, but what astonishes me most is the ability of Amit Dutta to compose those images, and even more, to light them. The lighting is breathtaking. It tells you why Nainsukh would have taken such care with details, maybe especially with the folds of cloth."

Milo C. Beach even stated, "I think that this will do more for public interest in Indian painting that all the many scholarly essays."

Nainsukh has been widely discussed by critics for its unique formal qualities which evade categorization. The film is said to be balancing between a documentary approach and playful plot, developing its own visual language by interpreting and questioning Indian art history and one of its greatest artists. While deeply rooted in Indian tradition and philosophy, the film is also seen by eminent critic Olaf Moller as a "thought-provoking investigation into the slippery, ever-changing nature of realism, its representation in the arts. A true masterpiece of Indian modernism."

With no considerable dialogue, the almost silent film is considered to create "a hypnotic fusion of imagery and sound that conjures up a lost age". George Heymont of Huffington Post also observes the lack of dialogue and calls the film "visually stunning and acoustically stimulating that its beauty can often take the viewer’s breath away". Galina Stoletneya remarks that "By harmoniously juxtaposing the gorgeous visuals with outstanding sound design, the filmmaker produces a unique work of art—a living painting itself—that stands on its own".

Max Goldberg of San Francisco Film Society observes that the film pays close attention to the finesse of Naisukh’s brushwork and his observant images of the patron’s more informal moments like smoking and beard-trimming. He adds that "When the filmmaker reconstructs one of Nainsukh’s more complexly staged scenes—as in the hunting of a tiger clutching its human prey—his cinematic technique of isolating different elements of a single scene evokes the dynamic register of imagination and realism animating the artist’s deceptively flat pictures."

In 2024, Richard Brody of The New Yorker included it in his selection of "The Best Bio-Pics Ever Made."
