= Jahangir Preferring a Sufi Shaikh to Kings =

Mughal miniature by Bichitr, c. 1615–1618

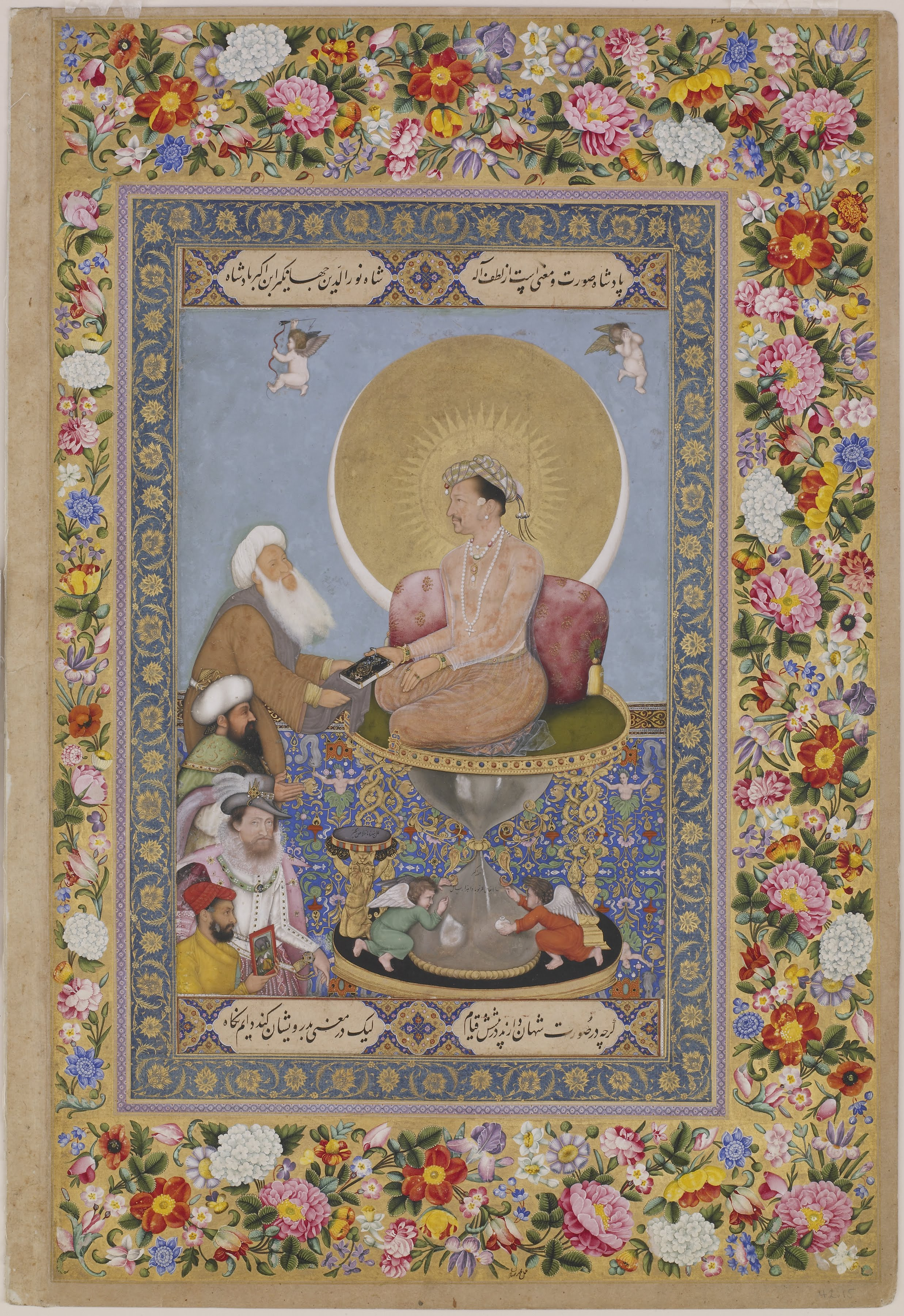
- Artist: Bichitr
- Year: c. 1615 – c. 1618
- Medium: Gouache, gold and ink on paper
- Movement: Mughal miniature
- Subject: Jahangir; Shah Hussain; Ahmed I; James VI and I; Bichitr
- Location: Freer Gallery of Art

Jahangir Preferring a Sufi Shaikh to Kings is a Mughal miniature painting by the Indian artist Bichitr for the court of the Fourth Mughal emperor Jahangir, dated to c. 1615–1618. It is now in the Freer Gallery of Art in Washington DC.

It depicts the emperor, seated upon a throne in the form of an hourglass, handing a book to a Sufi saint, while the Ottoman sultan and King James I of England look on. The artist Bichitr himself is pictured in the bottom-left corner of the image, in a self-insert.

== Description ==
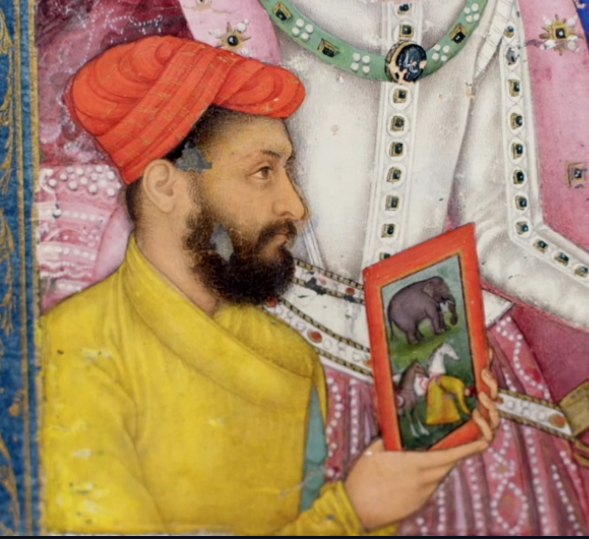
Details of the self-portrait of Bichitr

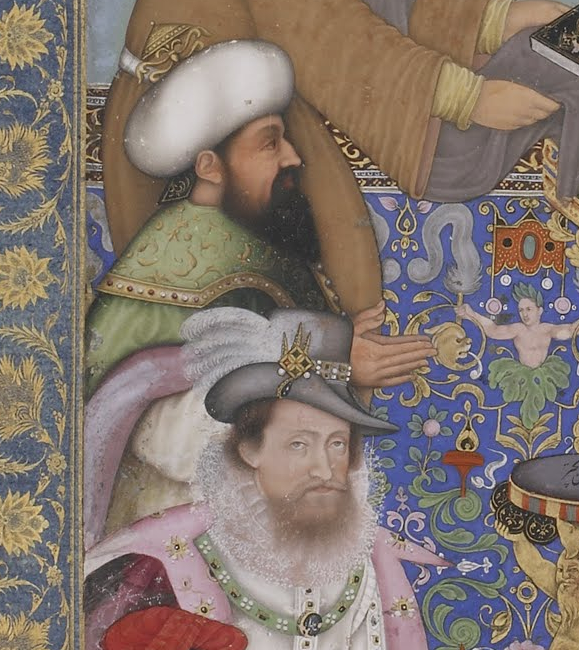
The depiction of the Ottoman sultan and James VI and I.

The emperor Jahangir is depicted wearing a jama, with a halo around his face combining the imagery of the sun and the crescent moon. He is slightly larger than the other figures, in accordance with hierarchical proportion. Thus, creating a sense of divinity and presenting the emperor with his status of ruler. Jahangir is wearing a larger turban on his head, which is smoother than the other turbans, to make him stand out from the others in the Mughal court.

He is seated on a throne shaped like a European hourglass. The hourglass can be interpreted as a reference to the second Islamic millennium, which began in 1591-2, some time before Jahangir's accession to the throne in 1605. On the hourglass, a Persian inscription reads, "God is great. O Shah, may the span of your reign be a thousand years". This might indicate that the painting was presented to the emperor on his birthday. The inscriptions contained in the margins above and below Jahangir within the cartouches convey the message that the emperor prefers gathering with holy men compared to visits from a court of kings. This is also represented in the depiction of Jahangir giving attention to saint Hussain and ignoring the artist Bichitr presenting the emperor with his painting.

Jahangir is seen offering a book to a bearded Sufi saint. The depicted saint is Shaikh Husain from the Indian Sufi Chishti sect started by Mu'in al-din Christi. The other men before him in order are the Ottoman sultan, the king of England and Scotland James VI and I, and then the artist Bichitr himself. In accordance with hierarchical proportion, it can be interpreted as Jahangir preferring Shaikh Hussain over fellow rulers.

The depiction of the unknown Ottoman sultan, which seems to be a general type rather than any specific portrait, draws from a work by Giovanni Bellini. The sultan wears green clothing with embroidered gold with pink lining on his over his arm, and a white turban. The style of turban worn by the Ottoman sultan is known as a Kavuk turban which is an Ottoman imperial turban. His hands are held out in a respectful manner towards Jahangir.

One of the many portraits of James I by John de Critz

The depiction of James VI and I is taken from a portrait by John de Critz, brought to India by the English ambassador Thomas Roe and presented to the emperor. James I wears European style attire; a pink cloak along with a white dress shirt, a ruff, a grey hat with feathers and jewelry. He faces away from Jahangir and towards the viewer with a hand near a decorated sword on his waist.

In the bottom-left corner of the image is the artist Bichitr. He is portrayed wearing a Hindu form of robe, and holding up a painting. Stuart C. Welch interprets this painting to be of Bichitr himself bowing to the emperor. This self-insertion as a sort of signature, became a custom in Mughal painting in the coming years.

The painting signifies Jahangir's reverence towards the saint, spurning the great monarchs vying for his audience. Bichitr’s painting being offered is seen as more than a simple picture or gift. Rather, it presents Bichitr as a prophet who exposes the hidden truth about divine order. Even his love for art fails to distract him from the spiritual, as even the artist Bichitr in the bottom-left fails to get his attention. Its dating coincides with the period when he shifted the capital to the holy city of Ajmer from 1613 to 1616.

A carpet of Venetian style occupies the background in the lower half of the main scene, while the upper half is sky blue. Four putti are seen in the picture. Two of them are at the bottom of the hourglass, gathering the sand which has fallen into the bottom half, while two are flying in the background.

Two Persian couplets are inscribed above and below the painting, reading, "By the grace of God is he truly a king both in form and spirit: the Shah Nur-ud Din Jahangir, son of Padshah Akbar; To all appearances, even as kings and potentates stand in attendance upon him, his gaze falls, inwardly, ever upon holy dervishes." These couplets, along with the border, are later additions.

The angel's motifs add to the heavenly aura that Jahngir is depicted in inclusive of the halo. With 2 angels at the base, and 2 angels at the top with bows representing cupid like child angels, similar to European putto. With Jahangir wearing a christian cross as a show of the Mughals leaders extension of power and diplomacy beyond his own religion, blending Persian and European traditions. The hourglass shows Jahangir assumption of the throne at the turn of the millennium, with the angels writing Persian text at the bottom.
