= Bichitr =

17th-century Indian painter

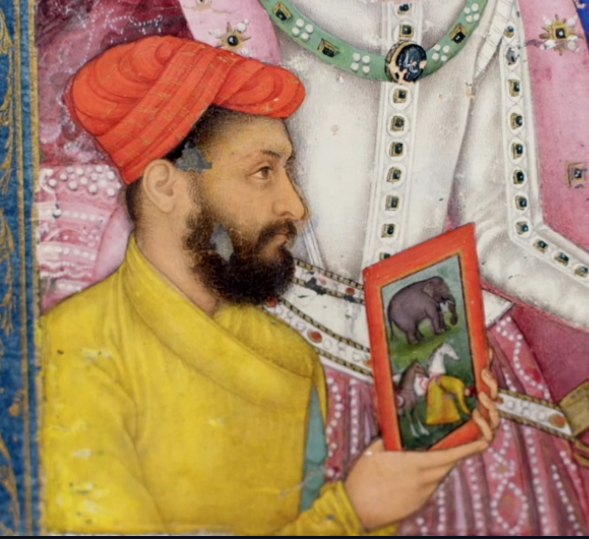
- Self-portrait from Jahangir Preferring a Sufi Shaikh to Kings, c. 1615–18 (detail)
- Notable work: Jahangir Preferring a Sufi Shaikh to Kings
- Style: Mughal
- Patrons: Jahangir and Shah Jahan

Bichitr (fl. 17th century) was an Indian painter during the Mughal period, patronized by the emperors Jahangir and Shah Jahan. The earliest known painting of his is a mature work from c. 1615.

Most of his paintings are formal portraits, and a large number of portraits in the 1630s are credited to him. Stuart Cary Welch, noting that he painted the likeness of nearly every important personage from this period, calls him "the Mughal Van Dyke". He was active until the 1640s at least. Milo C. Beach concludes from Bichitr's clothing in self-portraits that Bichitr was Hindu.

== Works ==
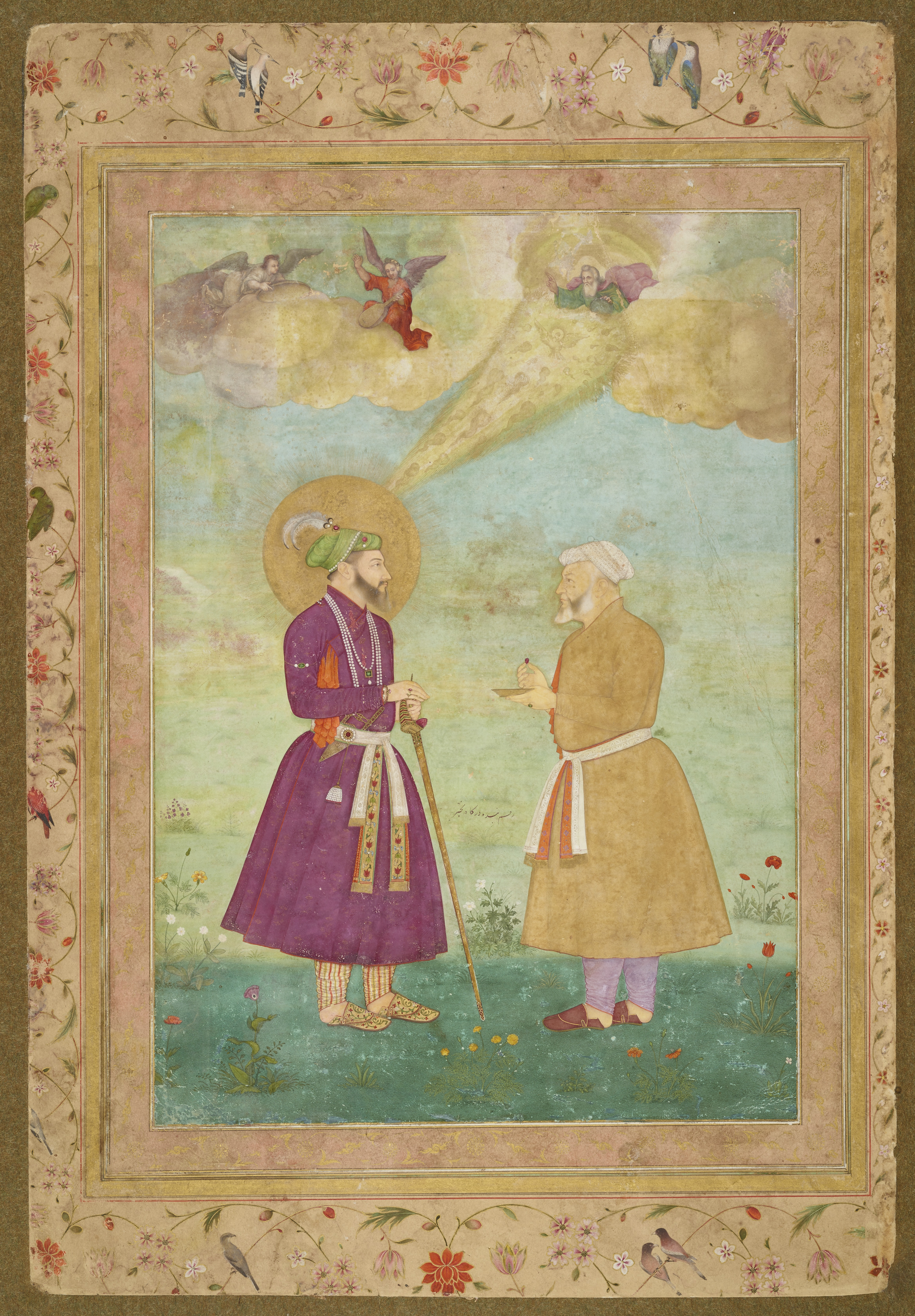
Shah Jahan with Asaf Khan, c. 1640. The light radiating from god the father culminates in the halo around Shah Jahan.

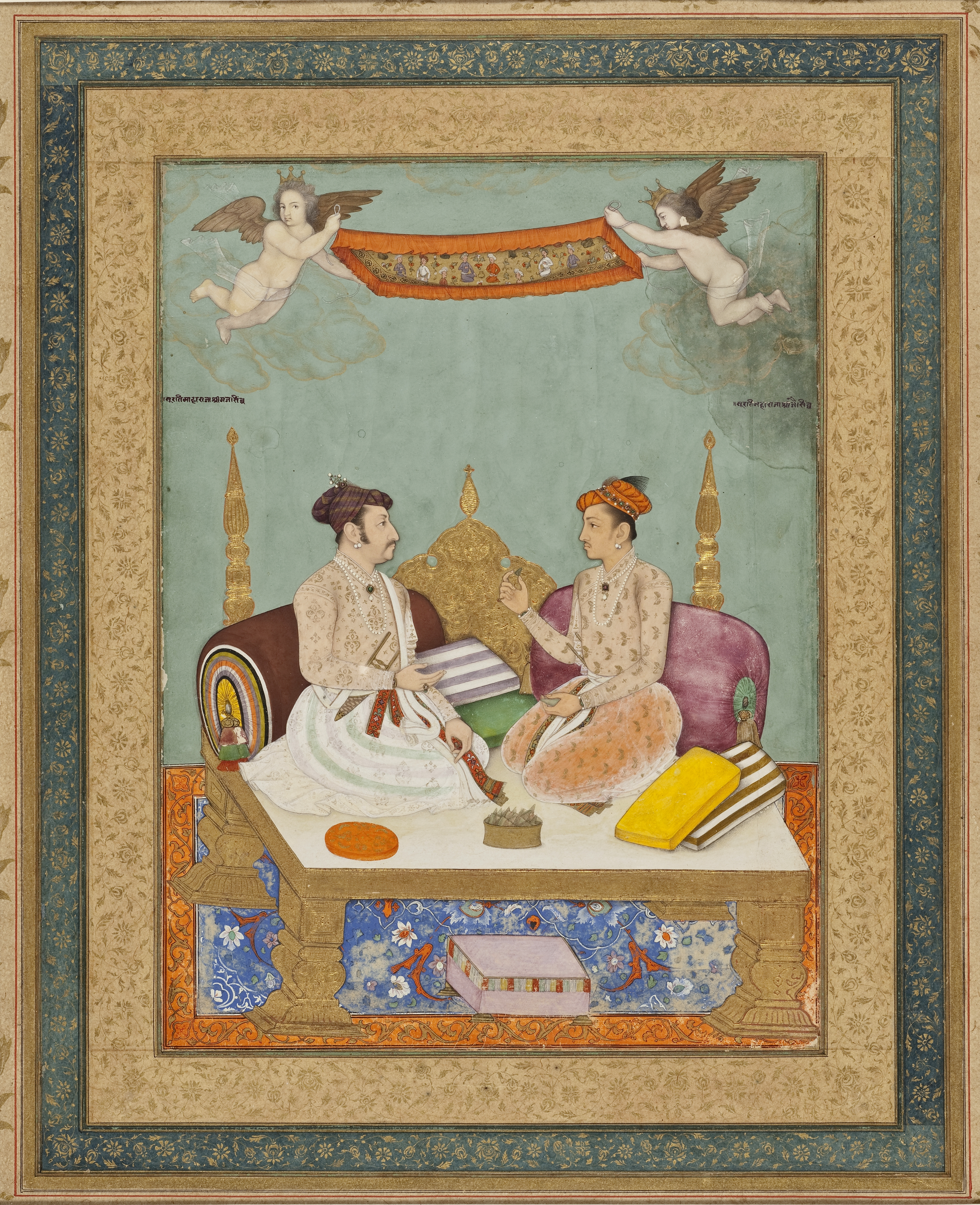
Shah Shuja Enthroned with Maharaja Gaj Singh of Marvar, ca. 1638.

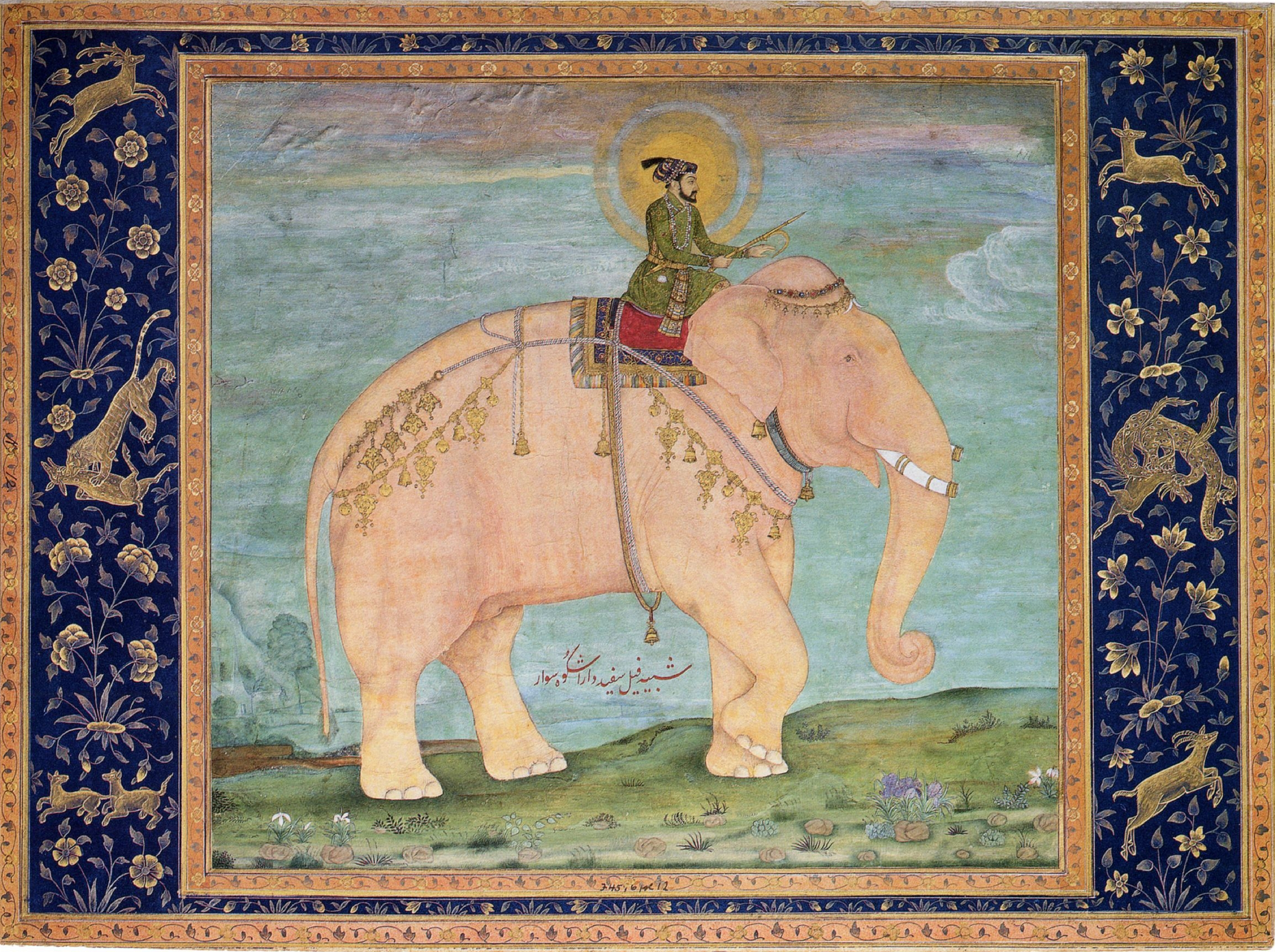
Dara Shikoh on a pink elephant

Bichitr's earliest works are datable to the late 1610s and early 1620s. He may have been an apprentice of Abu'l Hasan, and his style may be considered a variant of Hasan's style.

One of his earliest works is Jahangir Preferring a Sufi Shaikh to Kings dated to c. 1615-1618. It depicts Jahangir offering a book to a bearded Sufi saint while the King of England and the Ottoman sultan, as well as Bichitr himself stand in attendance, all spurned in favor of the holy man. The self-insertion of Bichitr later became a custom in Mughal painting. The painting exhibits European influences that Bichitr is known for. This is seen in the depiction of putti as well as the depiction of the English and Ottoman monarchs, which are copied from paintings by John de Critz and Giovanni Bellini respectively. However, European perspective is deliberately rejected in the design of the flat carpet, which forms the lower background of the work.

European influences are apparent in Shah Jahan with Asaf Khan. Here, God the father is seen in the clouds, with divine light emanating from him, reaching the halo around Shah Jahan. Within this light is a dove, which symbolizes the holy spirit. Thus, the emperor is equated with Jesus, as the other figures of the trinity are represented.

A large number of portraits in the 1630s can be attributed to Bichitr. Stuart Cary Welch calls him "the Mughal Van Dyke", and says that he painted almost every important figure during this period. Notable works include Shah Shuja Enthroned with Maharaja Gaj Singh of Marvar, and Jujhar Singh Bundela Kneels in Submission to Shah Jahan, the latter of which served as the inspiration for a sketch by Rembrandt.

While known for his formal portraits of people, Bichitr also painted animal figures, notably Dara Shikoh on a pink elephant and Portrait of the Elephant 'Alam Guman.

Bichitr was also one of the artists of the famous Windsor Padshahnama. The final works attributed with certainty to him are from the 1640s. These are the Darbar of Aurangzeb and Episode in a Bazaar, the latter of which is unfinished.

== Style ==
Milo C. Beach states that he paints with "a brilliant, but hard line", and calls his use of colors and patterns bold and assertive, producing an effect of "cold formality". Other critics have similar views of his work. Wheeler Thackston calls him the most observant of the Mughal artists.

Bichitr's work draws inspiration from European paintings. This influence is seen in his mastery of trompe-l'œil reflections and use of cast shadows.

== Gallery ==
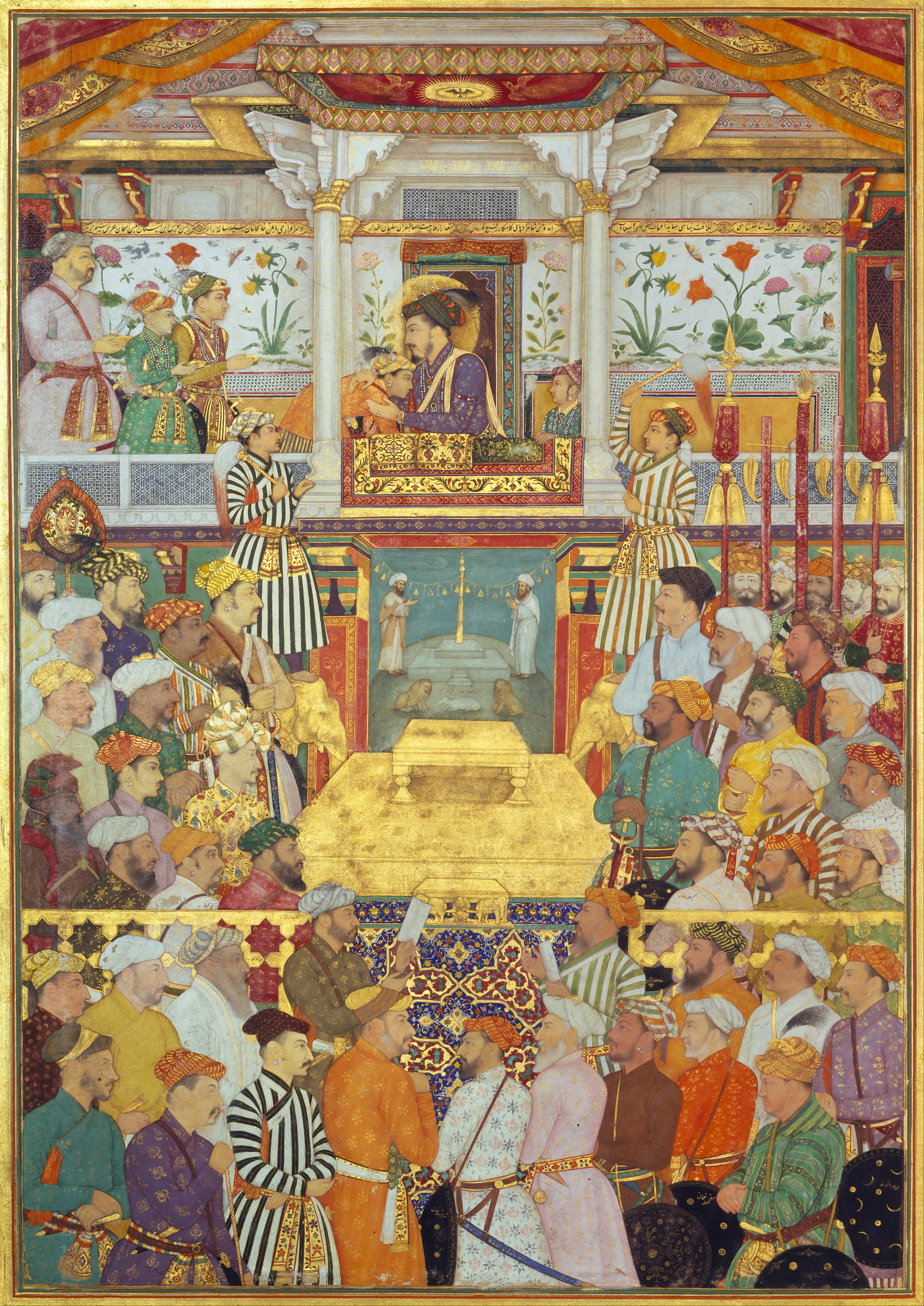
Padshahnama plate 10 : Shah Jahan receives his three eldest sons and Asaf Khan during his accession ceremonies (8 March 1628)
