= Shriniwas Joshi =

Indian Columist, Theater Artist and retired Civil Servant (born 1936)

Shriniwas Joshi (born 11 May 1936) is a columnist, theatre artist, and retired civil servant from Himachal Pradesh, India. As a columnist, Joshi is especially known for his column 'Vignettes' in the Indian English daily The Tribune, through which he has documented people, history, places, and idiosyncratic things all across Himachal Pradesh. As a theatre figure, he has been associated for decades with Shimla's historic Gaiety Theatre, for which he has written, acted in, and directed a number of plays. As a retired civil servant, Joshi has been active in various civic causes in Shimla, including heritage conservation, environmental protection, and the promotion of arts.

== Personal life and career ==
Joshi was born in 1936 in Simla, British India. He did an M.A. in political science from the Panjab University in Chandigarh, and then an MA in economics from the Punjabi University in Patiala. Afterwards, he joined government service as a statistician, and retired as an officer of the Indian Administrative Service in 1994. In his administrative capacity, among other tasks, Joshi served as special secretary to Himachal Pradesh's Chief Minister Virbhadra Singh, as Director of Primary Education, and as Director of the Department of Art, Culture, and Language in the Government of Himachal Pradesh. He served as the Deputy Commissioner of Kangra district, Himachal Pradesh, from 29 June 1992 till 4 August 1993. Post-retirement, he served as the administrator of Indus Hospital, Shimla, and as a member of the Board of Management, Himachal Pradesh Agriculture University (Palampur, H.P.). Over 2009-12, Joshi was a member of the Inter Agency Core Group in Shimla, for the Government of India - UNDP Urban Risk Reduction Project. He is a member of the Himachal Pradesh University Court.

He lives at Panchwati house, at village Kanena-Pagog (post office Bharari), near Shimla, with his wife Yamini.

== Cultural contributions ==
Joshi writes in English and Hindi. Joshi has written numerous columns and articles for a number of Indian national daily newspapers in English, including The Tribune, The Times of India, and The Indian Express. He is particularly known for his column 'Vignettes' in The Tribune. His articles are generally essays about places, events, facets of culture, and contemporary and historical personalities of Himachal Pradesh. Joshi published a compilation of several of his column pieces in English as a book called Babudom Bosh + squibs of sweet and sour shots. He has also written several short stories and plays.

Joshi has directed and acted in numerous plays at Shimla's historic Gaiety Theatre. He has had his own theatre group called 'Amateur Evening'. Along with his wife Yamini, he played key roles in Amit Dutta's movie Nainsukh (2010), an artistic biographical look at the 18th century painter Nainsukh from Kangra. The movie won international critical acclaim.

Joshi is a member of the Amateur Dramatics Club, Shimla, the Shimla Amateur Garden and Environment Society (SAGES), and the Himachal Pradesh chapter of INTACH.

== Recognition ==
- For 2018-2022, Joshi was nominated and appointed to the General Council of the Sahitya Akademi, India's national academy of letters, as an Advisory Member for Hindi.
- In 2018, Joshi was one of the two persons appointed to the General Council of the Himachal Pradesh Academy on account of their fame as performing artists, the other being Bharti Kuthiala.
- Joshi was among the 20 prominent personalities of Shimla who were invited to contribute to the volume The Deputy Commissioner, Shimla: two centuries of an institution (1815-2015), which was published in 2015 by the Deputy Commissioner's Office, Shimla. Joshi contributed two essays, one titled 'Hindustani Theatre in Shimla' and the other titled 'Shimla in Folksongs'.
- Joshi is a recipient of several awards, including the Shimla Amateur Dramatics Award, the Himachal Shri Award, the Akashvani Award, and the Humanitarianism & Service Award by Indus Medical Foundation, U.S.A. In 2015, Joshi was awarded the Lifetime Achievement Honour by the Himalaya Sahitya, Sanskriti evam Paryavaran Manch, for his 'contributions to Himalayan art, history, culture, literature, and social participation'.

== Select bibliography ==
- Ghughutiya (in Hindi). (Delhi: Atmaram and Sons, 1997)
- Babudom Bosh + squibs of sweet and sour shots. (Delhi: Sanbun Publishers, 2004).
- Sunni bhunku: Himachal Pradesh ke Chamba zile ki prem lok katha (in Hindi). (Delhi: National Book Trust, 2005).
- Hum nahi sudhrenge: Shriniwas Joshi ke laghu natak (in Hindi). (Delhi: Atmaram and Sons, 2016).
- Begmu ki su (in Hindi). (Ghaziabad: K.L. Pachauri Prakashan, 2021)
