= Amit Dutta =

Indian filmmaker

Amit Dutta is an Indian experimental filmmaker and writer who was born in 1977 in Jammu. He is considered to be one of the most significant contemporary practitioners of experimental cinema, known for his distinctive style of film-making rooted in field research and personal symbolism, resulting in images that are visually rich and acoustically stimulating. His works mostly deal with subjects of art history, ethno-anthropology, and cultural inheritance through cinema.

In 2007, the film critic Jonathan Rosenbaum included his short film Kramasha in his personal list of the one thousand essential films of all time. In 2024, Richard Brody, writing for the Newyorker named his first feature film Nainsukh (2010) among the best biographical films ever made.

== Life and career ==
Amit Dutta graduated from the Film and Television Institute of India, Pune in 2004. He has taught at the National Institute of Design (NID), Ahmedabad. In 2015, he joined the Indian Institute of Advanced Study (IIAS), Shimla as a Tagore fellow.

=== Early works ===
Amit Dutta began his career making several short experimental films which critics described as "without precedents except probably for a distant echo of Sergey Parajanov's avant-garde play with childhood memories, making the director probably the most singular and idiosyncratic in the world." His montages are considered as baffling the eye and the urge to interpret, being interwoven with a complex labyrinth of allusions from historical reminiscences, fairytales, children's stories, texture etc.

==== Kramasha (To Be Continued) (2007) ====
Kramasha (To Be Continued), an experimental short film made in 2007, earned considerable acclaim from film scholars and critics. In 2007, the film critic Jonathan Rosenbaum included it in his personal list of the one thousand best films of all time, describing the film as "a dazzling, virtuoso piece of mise en scene in 35-millimeter, full of uncanny imagery about the way the narrator imagines the past of his village and his family." It was also voted as one of the best films in the Senses of Cinema poll in 2007.

The FIPRESCI Jury at the 2007 Oberhausen Film Festival gave the film the Critic's Prize, remarking, "Now that 35-millimeter appears to be a format whose pleasures are being overlooked or forgotten, especially in the realm of short films, the sensual pleasures of Amit Dutta's 22-minute To Be Continued (Kramasha) seem all the more precious..."

The Jury at the 2008 Mumbai International Film Festival gave Kramasha the Golden Conch for the Best Film of the Festival, stating that, "In the manner music keeps you quietly enthralled with a resonating sense of things without a need to necessarily reduce the experience to a verbalization of meanings, Kramasha offers a world of images and sounds that made us smell and touch the lush of nature amid a mysterious index of hallucinations. Like a dream that we may fail to understand but that reaches deep recesses of our unconscious and touches familiar chords, Amit Dutta's Kramasha weaves a powerful narrative that blends legends, myths and nostalgia into a film that allows us to recall our own early experiences."

==== Aadmi ki Aurat Aur Anya Kahaniyan (The Man's Woman and Other Stories) (2009) ====
The Man's Woman and Other Stories, a triptych of three separate short-stories, received the Jury's Special Mention Award of the Orizzonti [New Horizons] section of the 66th Venice Film Festival, with the note that the film "opens a window on a new form of film-making on many levels". Jury-member and film-artist Bady Minck wrote that the director "creates images which are poetic and unsettling at the same time. They oscillate between the fantastic and the concrete, imagination and present-day reality".

Barbara Wurm, writing in Senses of Cinema magazine stated that the director "celebrates neo-expressionist cinematography and demonstrates outstanding skills in merging the tempus and the mode of narration, a very sophisticated plot wandering from reality to possibility and back being the result: Aadmi ki aurat aur anya kahaniya (The Man's Woman and Other Stories)”

In an article for the magazine Film Comment Nicolas Rapold commented, "The Man's Woman and Other Stories renders three short stories with such exquisite gemlike colour and composition and feel for rhythm that their subject matter fades into the background."

==== Sonchidi (The Golden Bird) (2011) ====
Sonchidi (The Golden Bird) concerns two travellers' quest for a flying craft that they believe would help them cross the cycle of births, with The Rotterdam Film Festival describing it as an "intriguing philosophical piece which evokes many memories, challenges various interpretations. Truly cinematic, a connoisseur's piece."

=== Nainsukh (2010) ===
Since 2007 Dutta has collaborated with the art historian Eberhard Fischer on research in the Kangra Valley of Himachal Pradesh, eventuating in Dutta directing the feature film Nainsukh in 2010. The film is based on the biography of an 18th-century master painter of the same name belonging to the region, and contains meticulous recreations of Nainsukh's miniatures through compositions set amidst the ruins of the Jasrota palace where the artist was retained. Its unique formal qualities have been noted as evading categorisations, evident in its balancing of documentary approach and playful plot, and in developing its own visual language by interpreting as well as questioning Indian art history and one of its greatest artists. With little dialogue, the almost silent film is considered to create "a hypnotic fusion of imagery and sound that conjures up a lost age".

While deeply rooted in Indian tradition and philosophy, the film was seen by eminent critic Olaf Moller as a "thought-provoking investigation into the slippery, ever-changing nature of realism, its representation in the arts. A true masterpiece of Indian modernism". George Heymont of The Huffington Post also observed the lack of dialogue and called the film "visually stunning and acoustically stimulating that its beauty can often take the viewer's breath away" Galina Stoletneya remarked that, "By harmoniously juxtaposing the gorgeous visuals with outstanding sound design, the filmmaker produces a unique work of art—a living painting itself—that stands on its own". Max Goldberg of The San Francisco Film Society observes that the film pays close attention to the finesse of Naisukh's brushwork and highlights Dutta's observant images of the patron's more informal moments like smoking and beard-trimming. Goldberg adds that, "When the filmmaker reconstructs one of Nainsukh's more complexly staged scenes - as in the hunting of a tiger clutching its human prey - his cinematic technique of isolating different elements of a single scene evokes the dynamic register of imagination and realism animating the artist's deceptively flat pictures".

Nainsukh premiered at the 67th Venice Film Festival; was presented in the World Cinema Spotlight section of the San Francisco Film Festival; was showcased at MoMA, New York; and travelled widely to many film festivals including Rotterdam, Beijing and Vancouver among others. Film Comment magazine rated the film as one of the top ten films of the 67th Venice Film Festival, and the Ferroni Brigade group of film critics nominated it as one of the best films of that same festival. Film critics polled by Senses of Cinema voted it among the best films of both 2010 and 2017), and in 2024, in The New Yorker, Richard Brody named Nainsukh (2010) among the best biographical films ever made.

Nainsukh has also received a great deal of appreciation from film critics and art historians. American art historian Milo Beach stated, "I think that this will do more for public interest in Indian painting than all the many scholarly essays."

=== Other Works ===
After graduating from film school in 2004, Dutta spent many months interviewing painters from the Gond tribal community of Madhya Pradesh who had migrated to the city of Bhopal following the success and untimely demise of the pioneering young Gond artist, Jangarh Singh Shyam. This resulted in the film Jangarh Film-One, which revolves around the absence of Jangarh's legacy in the contemporary art practice of his kin. Dutta also made a feature-length documentary Ramkhind, a meditative observation of the everyday life of the people in a Warli village, which has produced some of the finest contemporary painters in its distinctive folk idiom.

Following Nainsukh in 2010, Dutta's interest focused more specifically on the art-historical and cultural aspects of the Kangra Valley and its surrounding area, with most of his recent work being based in that region.

In the years 2011 to 2012 he recorded extensive conversations with B.N.Goswamy - another eminent Indian art-historian and an authority on Pahari Art - for the production of an archive of Goswamy's works in twenty volumes. The short films The Museum of Imagination: A Portrait in Absentia - an abstract portrait of Goswamy - and Field-Trip were created during the archiving process.

The Museum of Imagination was first shown at the Rome Film Festival and subsequently at Rotterdam and Oberhausen Film Festivals. Andrea Picard, a columnist for Cinema Scope magazine and Chief Curator of Wavelengths, the Toronto International Film Festival's avant-garde section, wrote about the film that, "Dutta continues his exploration of Indian art history and culture...The quietude in the film – the quest to understand the silences as much as the conversation – speaks volumes about the weight of art and creativity... While the film exudes precision and grace, its admiration and respect for its subject is awakened outward, never venerated into stasis. Studying art is a way of seeing the world; the film's official subtitle, "portrait in absentia" suggests infinitude as Dutta's discerning eye alludes to the images that will forever remain lodged in our memory spurring us on as a life force".

== Books ==
- Kaljayi Kambakht (2016) is his first novel in Hindi. Dutta being awarded the Krishna Baldev Vaid Fellowship for outstanding contribution to Experimental Hindi Literature. It was among the seven books shortlisted for the 2023 Armoury Square Prize for South Asian Literature in Translation.
- Khud Se Kayi Sawal (Many Questions to Myself) (2018) is a selection from his journals as a film student, translated into Hindi by writer Geet Chaturvedi.
- Invisible Webs: An Art Historical Inquiry Into The Life And Death of Jangarh Singh Shyam (2018) explores the art-historical background of the art, life and suicide of the artist Jangarh Singh Shyam, who belonged to the Gond-Pardhan tribe of Central India. Its foreword is written by art-historian Partha Mitter.
- Gyarah Rupay Ka Fountain Pen (2021) is a book of short-stories for children. In 2022 it was included in Tata Trusts' Parag Honours List - an effort to promote good quality children's literature in India - as one of the best books for children.
- A book on his body of work, Modernism By Other Means (2021) by the film critic Srikanth Srinivasan, examines Dutta's body of work.

== Screenings ==
Dutta's films have been screened at various museums and film festivals, including:

- Berlin Film festival
- Venice Film festival
- Vienna International Film Festival
- International Film Festival Rotterdam
- International Short Film Festival Oberhausen
- Toronto International Film Festival (TIFF Bell Lightbox)
- Yamagata International Documentary Film Festival (Japan)
- MAMI Mumbai Film Festival
- Cinéma du Réel (Centre Pompidou, Paris)
- Museum of Modern Art (MoMA, New York)
- Berkeley Art Museum and Pacific Film Archive (BAMPFA)
- Smithsonian Museum (The Freer Gallery of Art and Arthur M. Sackler Gallery)

== Awards and honors ==
Dutta's films have received a number of national and international awards, including: the Golden Conch and Best Film of the Festival Award at the Mumbai International Film Festival (MIFF); Gold Mikaldi at Bilbao (Spain); the FIPRESCI International Film Critic's Award at the 53rd Oberhausen Film Festival(Germany); the John Abraham National Award (Federation of Film Societies of India, Keralam); the main prize of the International Jury at the 70th International Short Film Festival, Oberhausen (Germany); Jury's Special Mention Award of the Orizzonti [New Horizons] section of the 66th Venice Film Festival and the National Award of India on four occasions. He received the Hubert Bal Award of the Rotterdam International Film Festival for his screenplay The Invisible One in 2012. The Ferroni Brigade group of film critics named him among the Best New Filmmakers of the Decade in 2011.

In 2013 he was invited by the Venice Film Festival to make a short film for its 70th anniversary on the theme of 'The Future of Cinema'. In October 2013 he was conferred the Indian title of honour Dogra Ratan for his contribution in the fields of Art and Culture. In 2015, he received a CNAP Award from the Centre National des Arts Plastiques in France for his project on the History of Chess. That same year he was awarded the Tagore fellowship at the Indian Institute of Advanced Study (IIAS), Shimla, where he wrote his first book. Many of his films have regularly been voted by film-critics in Senses of Cinema world polls as among the best of the year.

Rhythm Of A Flower - Dutta's 2024 animated biopic based on the life of Indian classical singer Kumar Gandharva - had its world premiere at the 2024 MAMI Mumbai Film Festival, where it competed in the South Asia Competition and won the Golden Gateway Award. In 2025 his short film Stream-Story won a mention in the Cultural Intangible Heritage Awards at the 47th Cinéma du Réel film festival.

== Retrospectives ==
Dutta's films have been compiled and screened as comprehensive retrospectives at several points in his career.

In 2010 the 56th International Short Film Festival Oberhausen profiled the director with seven of his short-films.

In March 2014 India's national academy of fine arts - Lalit Kala Akademi - organized a Cinema And Art Festival at the Government Museum and Art Gallery in Chandigarh which showcased a selection of both his short and feature films.

In March 2015, at the Centre Pompidou, Paris, the 37th Cinéma du Réel conducted a major retrospective of 14 of Dutta's features and short films entitled Amit Dutta: Through the Looking Glass, curated by eminent curator and film critic Marie-Pierre Duhamel Muller. Included in the retrospective was a round table conference dedicated to discussing the different stages of Dutta's filmography and artistic path, using excerpts from his films. In her introduction to the retrospective, Marie-Pierre Duhamel wrote: “Amit Dutta explores the expressive dimensions of cinema as a time machine. He builds up a universe for the spectator where research feeds the imaginary, where the arts, history and mythology form part of landscapes and gestures and where knowledge enchants reality.” She added that his body of work evokes “the philosophical majesty of the image.”

In June 2015, the 8th International Documentary and Short Film Festival of Kerala (IFFK), hosted by the Kerala State Chalachitra Academy at Thiruvananthapuram, screened a retrospective of ten of his films.

Retrospectives (selected list):

- 2010 – International Short Film Ffestival, Oberhausen, Germany.
- 2014 – Lalit Kala Akademi, Chandigarh, India.
- 2015 – Through The Looking Glass – Cinéma du Réel, Centre Pompidou, Paris, France.
- 2015 – International Documentary and Short Film Festival of Kerala (IFFK), India.
- 2017 – LAC Lugano Arte e Cultura, Lugano, Switzerland
- 2017 – Amit Dutta's Cinematic Museum, Berkeley Museum and Pacific Film Archive (BMPFA), University of California.
- 2017 – Modernism By Other Means, Bombay Art Society, Mumbai.
- 2018 – National Film Archive of India (NFAI), Pune.
- 2020 – The Inimitable Image—an Amit Dutta retrospective
- 2020 – Special Tribute – The Ca' Foscari Short Film Festival—Venice, Italy.
- 2021 – An Auteur's Palette- A festival of Amit Dutta's films—KNMA (Kiran Nadar Museum of Art)
- 2021 – Amit Dutta's Cinematic Museum, Freer and Sackler Gallery—Smithsonian Museum, Washington, DC.
- 2021 – Surface and Depth: Recent Short Films by Amit Dutta—Berkeley Museum and Pacific Film Archive (BMPFA), University of California
- 2022 – The Films of Amit Dutta – e-flux (Artist Cinemas) New York.
- 2023 – Animating The Archive: Short Films By Amit Dutta, (Icons: South Asia): MAMI Mumbai Film Festival.

== Filmography (selected list) ==
2001	Ramkhind 90 min
2007	Kramasha (To Be Continued) 22min
2008	Jangarh Film Ek (Jangarh Film One) 20 min
2009	Aadmi Ki Aurat Aur Anya Kahaniyan (The Man's Woman and Other Stories) 70 min
2010	Nainsukh 75 min
2011	Sonchidi (The Golden Bird) 55min
2012	The Museum of Imagination 20 min
2013	Field-Trip 20 min
2013	Saatvin Sair (The Seventh Walk) 75 min
2014	Gitagovinda 35 min
2015	Chitrashala (House of Paintings) 20 min
2015	Lal Bhi Udhaas Ho Sakta Hai (Even Red Can Be Sad) 60 min
2016	Scenes from a Sketchbook 21 min
2017	The Unknown Craftsman 89 min
2019	Notes on Guler 55 min
2020	Wittgenstein Plays Chess with Marcel Duchamp, or How Not to Do Philosophy 17 min
2022	Mother Who Will Weave Now?
2023	Blueprint of a Pleasure Machine
2024	Many Interrupted Dreams of Mr. Hemmady
2024	Rhythm of a Flower
