= K. C. Aryan =

Indian art historian and collector

Kishan Chand Aryan
- Born: 11 August 1919; Amritsar, India
- Died: 15 January 2002 (aged 82); Gurugram, near New Delhi, India
- Occupations: Artist, art historian and collector
- Years active: 20th century
- Style: Academic realism, folk-inspired style, figurative, abstract, metal assemblages, and collages
- Spouse: Smt. Kamala Aryan
- Children: 3 sons, 2 daughters

Academic work
- Main interests: Folk and tribal artwork
- Website: https://www.museumoffolkandtribalart.in/

Kishan Chand Aryan (1919–2002), commonly abbreviated as K. C. Aryan, was an Indian contemporary artist, art historian and collector. He was the author of 23 books, covering art-topics from a scholarly perspective.

== Early life ==
=== Birth and family background ===
K.C. Aryan was born into a family of hereditary artists with roots in Iran. His forefathers were known for their innovative pictorial techniques, one of which involved blending gold paint with enamel colors. In 1899, notable figures such as Sir George Watt, Sir George Birdwood, and Lockwood Kipling visited Aryan’s father, the late Harnamdas, to inquire about this distinctive technique. Harnamdasji practiced the traditional Kangra qalam style, known for its delicate and intricate brushwork. Aryan’s artistic legacy is deeply influenced by the techniques and traditions passed down through his family, and his contributions to Indian art reflect this rich heritage.

== Career ==
=== 1939–1949: Early Artistic Career ===
During this period, Aryan painted landscapes, portraits, symbolic paintings, and historical narratives in a Western academic style.

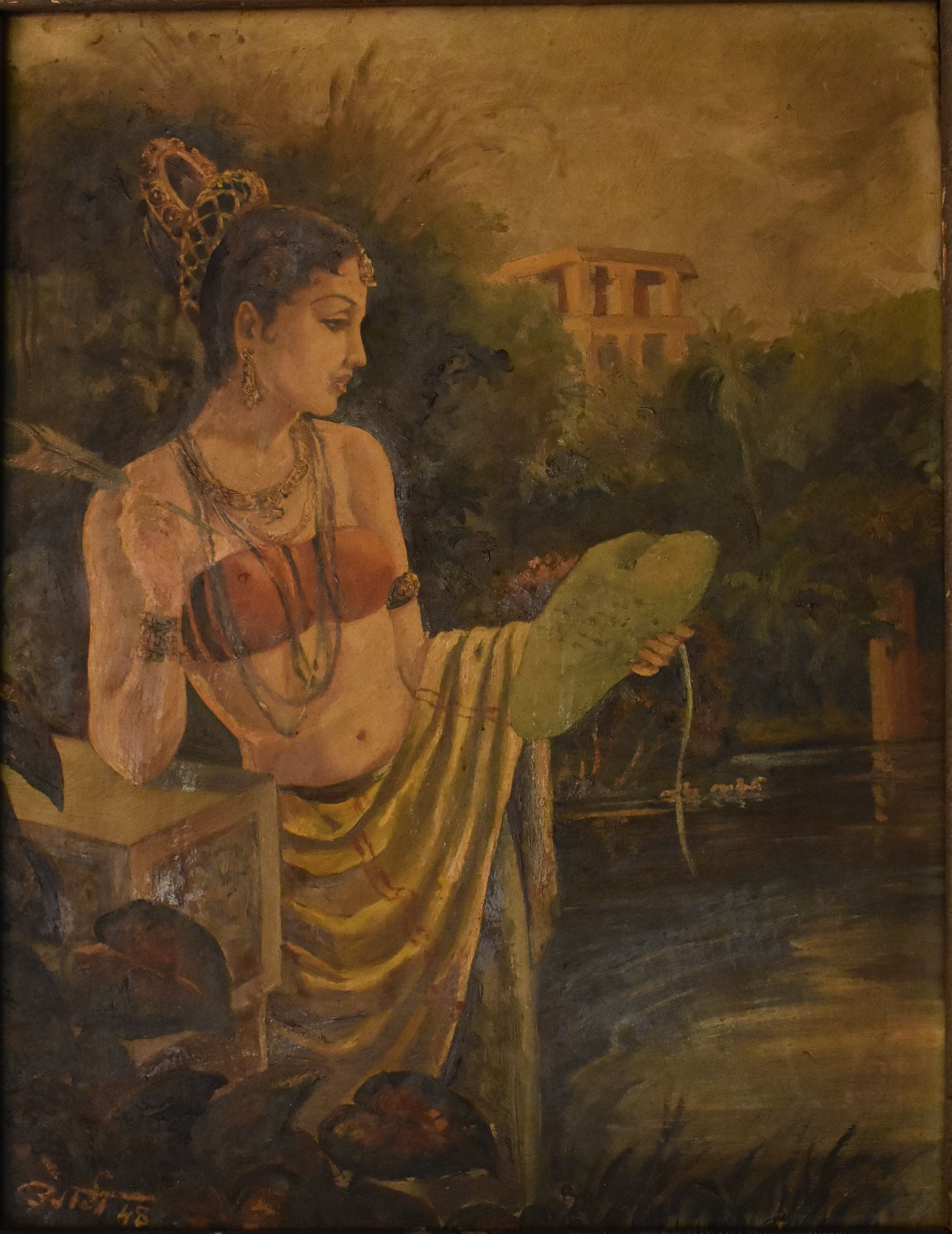
Shakuntala Writing Love Letter, oil on canvas, 1948

In 1940, he established his studio in Lahore, then a prominent art and culture hub, and gained significant recognition for illustrating books and painting book jackets or dust covers for wealthy Muslim publishers. Simultaneously, he painted historical compositions based on ancient Indian history themes, continuing this work until 1946.

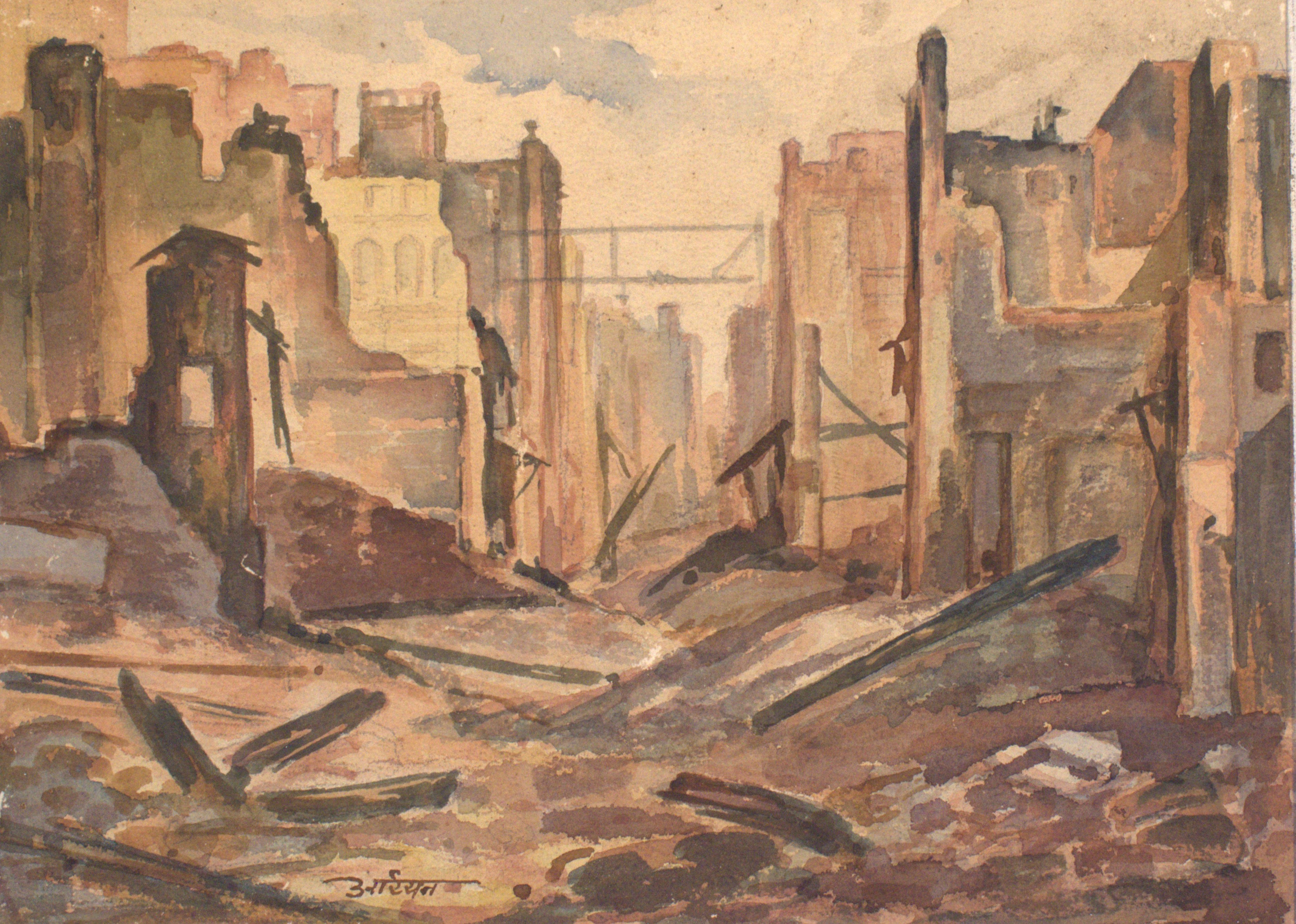
Destruction of houses in a Hindu locality in Lahore watercolour on paper 1947

In March 1947, with the onset of the Partition of India, Aryan chronicled scenes of the horrific massacres of Hindu-Sikh families by Muslims.

He left Lahore at the end of March 1947 and moved to Palampur in Kangra Valley, Himachal Pradesh. By December 1947, he had arrived in New Delhi, the newly established capital of Independent India.

In 1948, Aryan, alongside other displaced Punjabi artists from Lahore, sought to form a collective. This group later became the Delhi Silpi Chakra, which included artists from across India. The first group exhibition of the Chakra was held in March 1949 at Ratendon Road, New Delhi, and was inaugurated by Prime Minister Jawaharlal Nehru.

=== 1950–1957: Emergence of Unique Style ===
The period from 1950 to 1957 saw an eminently conducive atmosphere in the art circles of Delhi, allowing Aryan to evolve an innovative pictorial style that gained him widespread acclaim.

He painted genre scenes in a figurative style with an indigenist approach, utilizing tempera technique with an emphasis on linearity. His works gained recognition, with notable figures such as Smt. Indira Gandhi, P.A. Narielwala, and the CMDs of the World Bank and IMF purchasing his paintings.

Some of his works were also purchased by the Ministry of External Affairs, and these now adorn the offices of Indian ambassadors around the world.

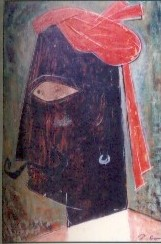
Darkhead, KC Aryan, 1953

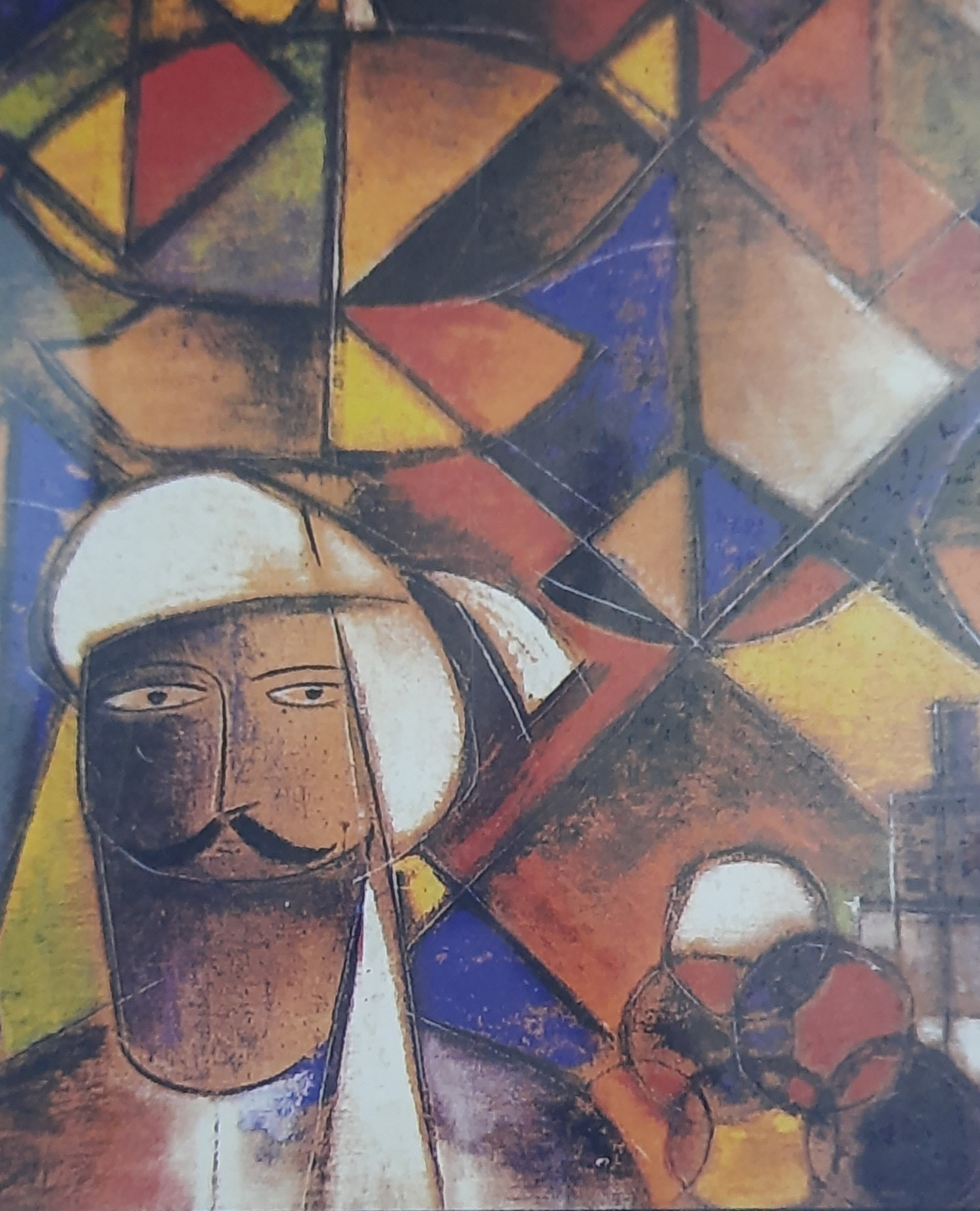
Kite Seller KC Aryan, 1954, North Zone Cultural Centre Patiala

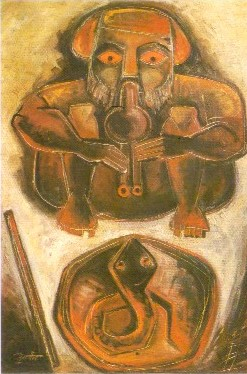
Snake Charmer, oil on canvas, KC Aryan,1954

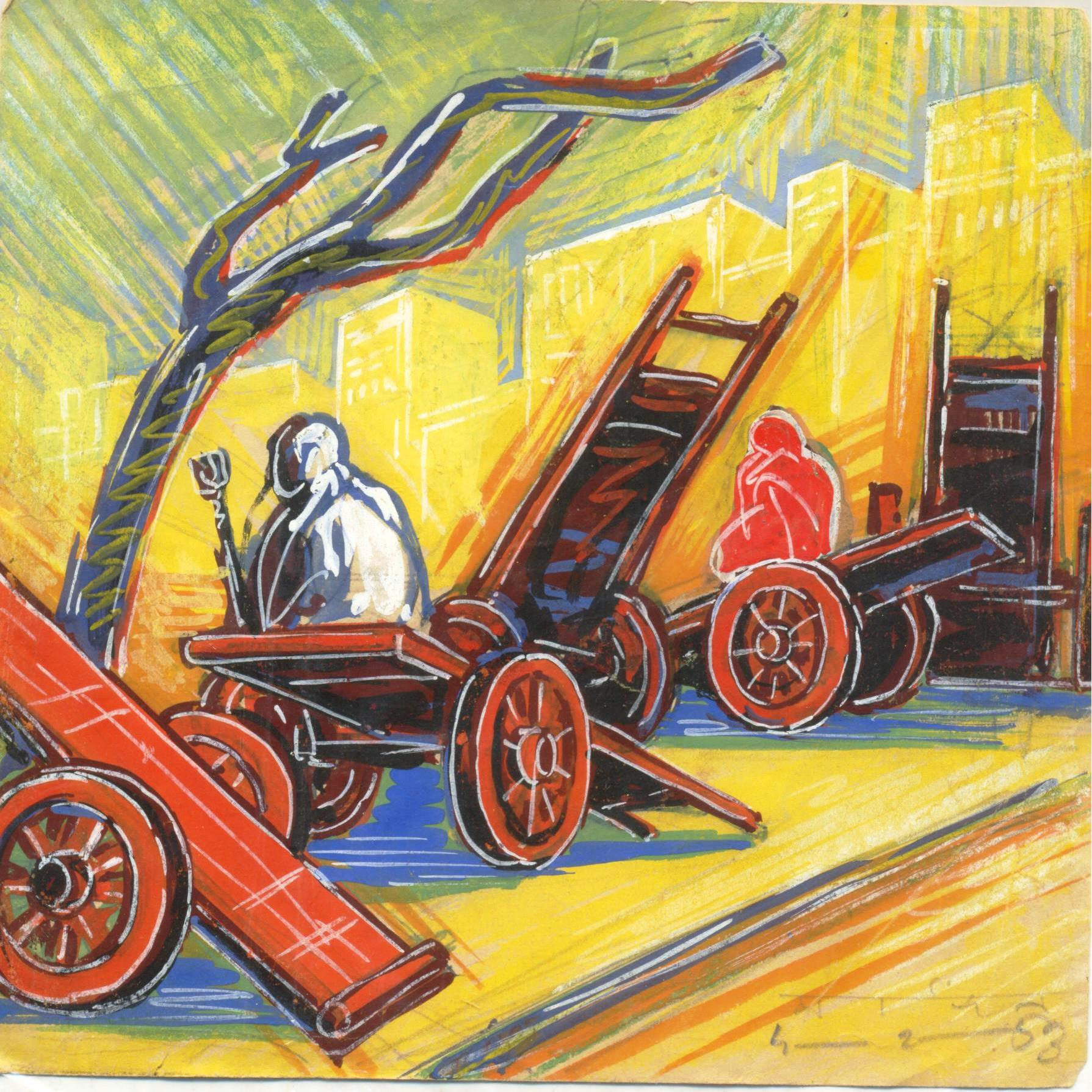
Siesta, KC Aryan, 1954

=== 1956–1958: Experimentation with Abstract Art ===
From 1956 to 1958, Aryan began experimenting with abstract art, a shift that laid the groundwork for his future works in metal assemblages and collages, which he continued to create until 1966.

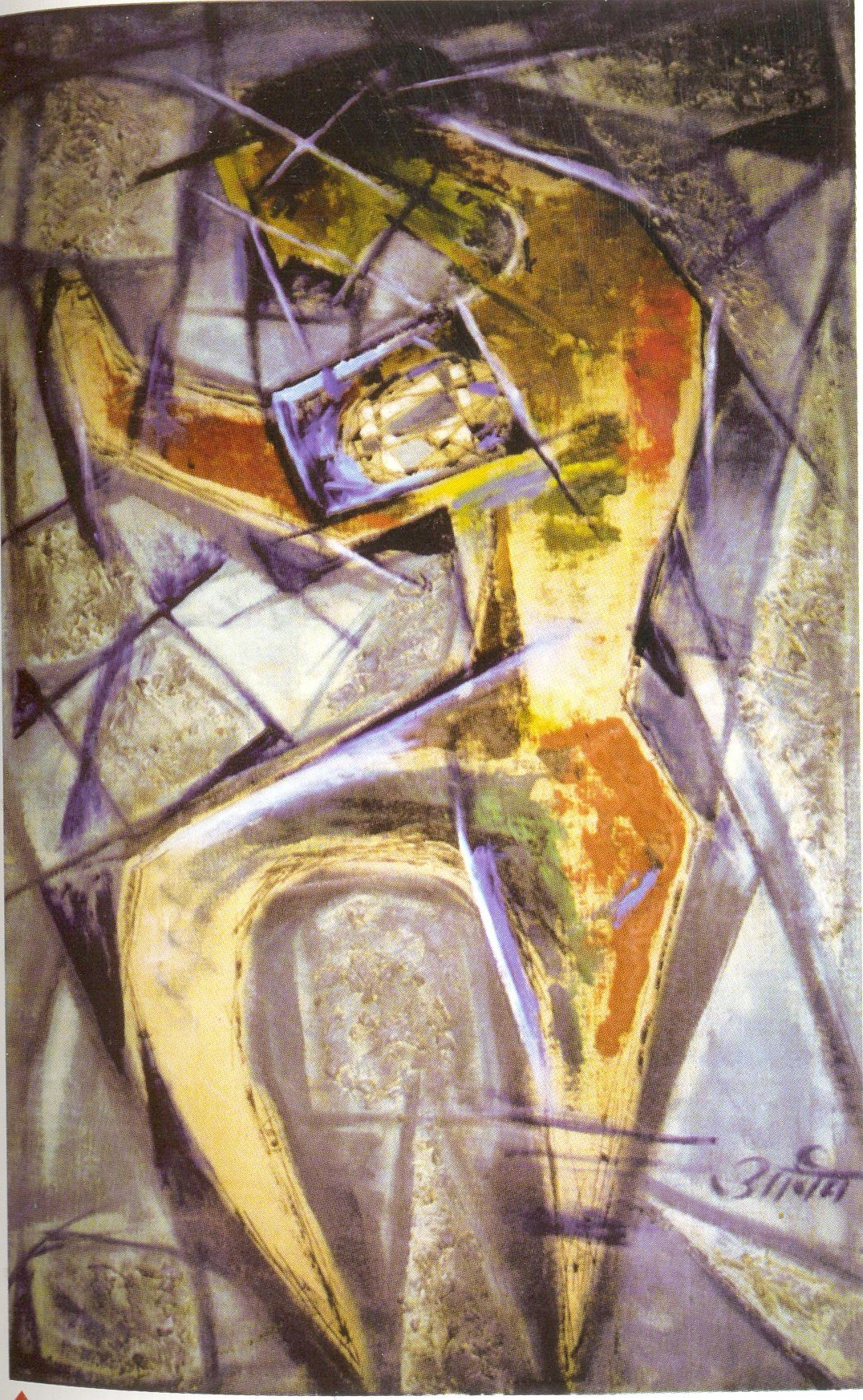
Woman gazing at herself in the mirror, K.C.Aryan, 1956

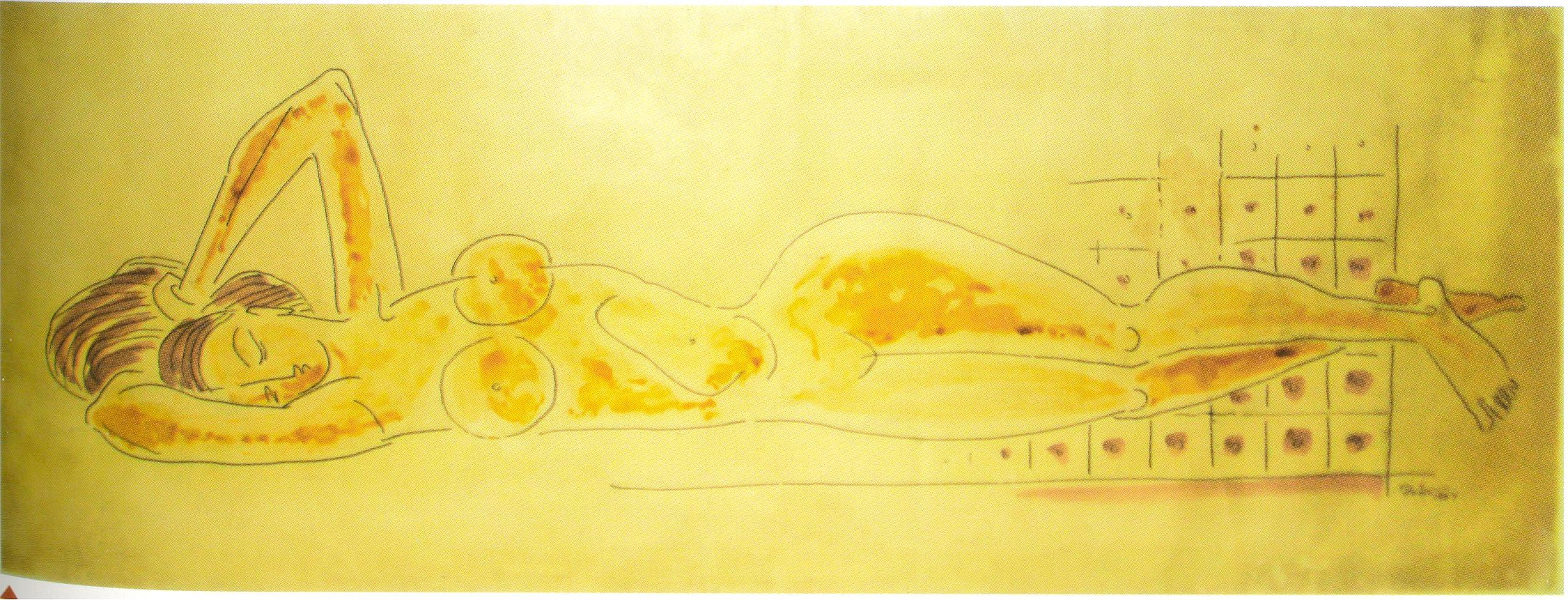
Reclining beauty, KC Aryan 1957

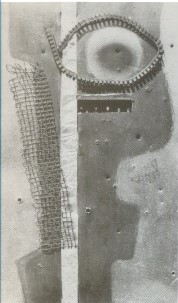
Portrait of an Art Critic, KC Aryan, 1958

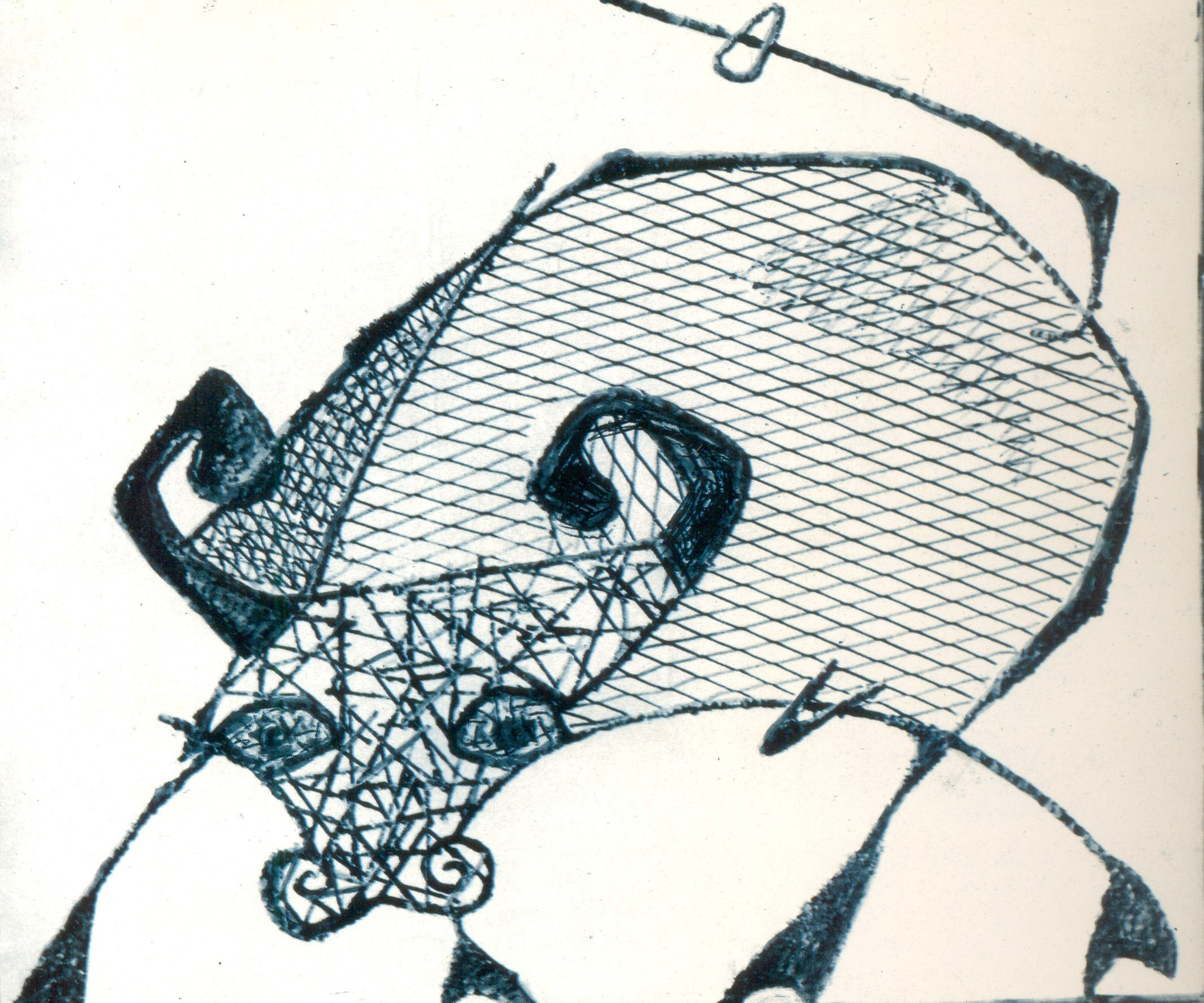
The Bull metal construction, KC Aryan, 1959, National Gallery of Modern Art New Delhi

=== 1958–1966: International Exposure and Metal Assemblages ===
Portrait of God (1962) the National Award winning metal assemblage 1964 Collection Lalit Kala Academy

In 1958, Aryan traveled abroad, visiting countries such as Afghanistan (Kabul, Kandahar), Iran, Iraq, Beirut (Lebanon), Greece, France, Italy, Amsterdam, and London. During these travels, he visited art galleries and museums, meeting several prominent artists. He was accompanied by Prof. N.S. Bendre and Sardar Gurcharan Singh of Delhi Blue Pottery.

This exposure revolutionized Aryan's outlook, inspiring him to experiment with new mediums, particularly metal scraps, wiremesh, and wrought iron. This led to the creation of his signature metal assemblages and collages. His innovative work garnered accolades from notable international figures such as Swiss architects Le Corbusier and Pierre Jeanneret (who were in Chandigarh at the time), Nobel Laureate Octavio Paz, Mulk Raj Anand, Stella Kramrisch, and Prof. J.L. Davidson, among others.

In 1964, the Lalit Kala Akademi awarded him the prestigious National Award for his contributions to the medium of metal assemblage. One of his works, *Portrait of God*, is now part of the Akademi's collection.

Aryan's wrought iron sculptures are displayed in several museums and private collections around the world, including the National Gallery of Modern Art in New Delhi, Punjabi University in Patiala, the Government Museum and Art Gallery in Chandigarh, and in collections owned by prominent personalities.

=== 1962: Kangra Qalam and Commissioned Work ===
In recognition of his skill in Kangra Qalam, a traditional style inherited from his father, Aryan was commissioned by the Lalit Kala Akademi to reproduce the frescoes from the Brijraj Swamy temple within the Nurpur fortress. The copies are currently on display at Bahawalpur House in New Delhi.

=== 1980s–1990s: Later Years and Thematic Paintings ===
During the 1980s and 1990s, Aryan painted a series of exceptional canvasses on a variety of themes, including the *Agni Series*, *Portrait of the Hindu*, *Composite Culture Riding over Hinduism*, and *Thirsty in the Land of Rivers*.

== Collection ==
Realizing the endangerment of the survival of tribal artwork, K. C. Aryan began his own collection of the form. Much of his artwork is sourced from states such as Himachal Pradesh, and exists in the form of folk-masks, wooden-carvings, pahadi roomal, mohra, and miniature paintings that were all created by unknown artisans. He has saved historical bronze and copper idols from being melted-down by purchasing them. Being a devotee of Hanuman, K. C. Aryan collected much artwork related to the monkey-god.

In 1984, he founded the Museum of Folk and Tribal Art, better known as K.C. Aryan's Home of Folk Art. The museum is based in Gurugram out of his former residence.

Around 100 pieces from K. C. Aryan's personal collection were displayed at the National Museum in New Delhi as part of the Unknown Pieces of Himachal Folk Art exhibition.

== Death ==
K. C. Aryan died in 2002 and the caretaking of his museum was left to his son Baij Nath Aryan and his daughter Subhasini Aryan.

== Bibliography ==
Some of K. C. Aryan's publications include the following:

=== Books ===
- Aryan, Kishan Chand (1975). Hanumān in Art and Mythology. Rekha Prakashan. ISBN 9780883868171.
- Aryan, Kishan Chand (1975). 100 Years Survey of Punjab Painting (1841–1941). Punjabi University (Patiala).
- Aryan, Kishan Chand (1977). Punjab Murals. Rekha Prakashan. ISBN 9788190000246.
- Aryan, Kishan Chand (1983). The Cultural Heritage of Punjab, 3000 B.C. to 1947 A.D. (illustrated ed.). Rekha. ISBN 9788190000291.
- Aryan, Kishan Chand (1996). Encyclopedia of Indian Art, References, Symbols, Evolution of Devanagari Script (4th ed.). Rekha Prakashan. ISBN 9788190000345.

=== Articles ===
- Aryan, Krishan Chand (1971). "Some Punjabi artists". Roop-Lekha. 39 (1).
- Aryan, Krishan Chand (June 1977). "Folk paintings (of the Sikhs)". Marg. 30: 64–65.
- Aryan, Krishan Chand (June 1977). "The pool of nectar (Golden temple)". Marg. 30 (3).

== See also ==
- B. N. Goswamy
