= Kaljayi Kambakht =

2016 novel by Amit Dutta

- First edition
- Author: Amit Dutta
- Language: Hindi
- Genre: Experimental novel
- Publisher: Art1st Foundation
- Publication date: 2016
- Publication place: India
- Media type: Print (Paperback)

Kaljayi Kambakht (कालजयी कमबख्त) is a Hindi language novel by Amit Dutta. The author was awarded the Krishna Baldev Vaid Fellowship for experimentation in Hindi language for this book.

== Synopsis ==
Sham is a precocious school boy who dreams about making sense of the world he inhabits. Shaman, his friend and alter-ego prods him along. They walk together exploring the gullies and outskirts of their suburban hill village. They passionately glean whatever information is available to them through books or people. They make patterns out of this information and scheme to gain control over their reality. The villagers become characters in their scheme and start revealing the cracks in their reality. As fragments of science, philosophy, fairy-tales, folk-legends and history start seeping into their everyday existence, Sham and Shan find themselves deep in an unmanageable world of their own fantasies.
