= Kanwarjit Singh Kang =

Punjabi art researcher

Kanwarjit Singh Kang (born 12 April 1942) is a Sikh art historian focused on Punjabi art. Kang has written a dozen research papers and thirteen books on the topics of art, handicrafts, and folklore of India. He also has contributed to English and Punjabi language newspapers and journals. His specialty is Punjabi murals. He served as the director of a research-project on the folk arts of northwest India financed by the National Academy of Art, Government of India. He served on the editorial board of the Roopa-Lekha periodical. He was the student of B. N. Goswamy.

== Biography ==
Kang was born in Takhran village in Ludhiana district in British Punjab in 1942. He passed his matriculation in 1957 and joined the school of art at Shimla after that, shifting afterwards to Chandigarh, completing a five-year diploma course in drawing and painting of commercial art in 1962. He became a college lecturer in art in 1963, completing his bachelor of art degree, and passed his M.A. in three subjects: Ancient Indian History and Culture, History of Art, and English.

Showing an early-interest in art since his youth, he completed his PhD at Panjab University, Chandigarh with a focus on mural paintings in 19th century Punjab under the supervision of B. N. Goswamy. He has travelled to many settlements across the state of Punjab in an attempt to document wall-paintings, including taking photographs of them, especially during the period of 1969–75. In 1985, he authored the book 'Wall Paintings of Punjab and Haryana', where Kanwarjit Singh Kang identified 175 sites in then Punjab that had extant mural artwork dating to the 19th century. He taught the subject of art at government colleges and retired as the Principal of the Govt. Ranbir College, Sangrur in 2000. Kang was awarded the Punjab Gaurav Sanmaan award in 2020. Kang was the teacher of Subhash Parihar.

== Collection ==
Kang possesses a personal collection of around five-thousand photographs and colour-slides documenting art objects of the states of Punjab, Haryana, and Rajasthan, including wall-paintings, miniature paintings, sculptures, wood-carvings, folk arts and crafts, and archeological objects. As a documenter of Sikh art, he has amassed a vast collection of 40,000 photographs of Punjabi wall paintings he has taken throughout his career. He has published many books analyzing the context of various murals he has captured with his camera. He has allowed the Panjab Digital Library to digitize his collection in his strong room.

== Bibliography ==
=== Books ===
- Wall Paintings of Punjab and Haryana (Atma Ram, 1985) by Kanwarjit Singh Kang
- Miṭṭī āpo āpaṇī: Paṇ̌jāba de kalā-wirase saṃbandhī lekhāṃ dā saṅgriha [in Punjabi] (Ārasī Pablisharaza, 1985) by Kanwarjit Singh Kang – Anthology of essays on art heritage of Panjab.
- One Hundred and Fifty Folk Tales of India (Ajanta Publications/Ajanta Books International, 1987, ISBN 978-81-202-0180-4) by Kanwarjit Singh Kang
- Punjab, Art and Culture (Atma Ram & Sons, 1988, ISBN 978-81-7043-096-4) by Kanwarjit Singh Kang
- Pañjāba de kandha-cittara [in Punjabi] (Patiala: Publication Bureau of Punjabi University, 1988) by Kanwarjit Singh Kang
- Hunar, Handicrafts of the North (North Zone Cultural Centre, 1989) by Kanwarjit Singh Kang
- Lok-Kala (Punjab) [in Punjabi] (Publication Division, Ministry of Information and Broadcasting, 1992) by Kanwarjit Singh Kang
- Vanished and Vanishing Wall Paintings of Punjab and Haryana (Unistar Books Pvt. Limited, 2022, ISBN 978-93-5205-586-9) by Kanwarjit Singh Kang

=== Articles ===
- Kang, Kanwarjit Singh. Art and architecture of Panjab. In Mohinder Singh, Ed. History and culture of Panjab. New Delhi: Atlantic Publishers, 1988, pp. 271–79.
- Kang, Kanwarjit Singh. Art and architecture of the Golden Temple. Nishaan, 1, 2002, 26–29. Also in Marg, 30, 1977.
- Kang, Kanwarjit Singh. Gurdwara Baba Atal. Marg, 30, 1977.
- Kang, Kanwarjit Singh. Maharaja Ranjit Singh as a patron of art and literature. Sikh Review, 28(320), Aug-Sep 1980, 112–14.
- Kang, Kanwarjit Singh. Maharaja Ranjit Singh's interest in the art of paintings. In Surindarpal Singh and Jasbir Singh Sabra, Eds. The rule of Maharaja Ranjit Singh: Nature and relevance. Amritsar: Guru Nanak Dev University, 2001, pp. 126–34. Also in Journal of Sikh Studies, 4(2), Aug 1977, 87–93.
- Kang, Kanwarjit Singh. Mural paintings in the nineteenth century Punjab. Ph.D. Thesis. Chandigarh: Punjab University, 1978.
- Kang, Kanwarjit Singh. Punjab art and culture. Delhi: Atma Ram & Sons, 1988. 206p.
- Kang, Kanwarjit Singh. Some observations of European travelers on wall paintings during the reign of Maharaja Ranjit Singh. Journal of Sikh Studies, 9(1), Feb 1982, 74–83.
- Kang, Kanwarjit Singh. Survival of wall paintings in Amritsar. Marg, 30, Jun 1977, 46–56.
- Kang, Kanwarjit Singh. Wall paintings of Punjab and Haryana. Delhi: Atma Ram & Sons, 1985. 193p.
- Kang, Kanwarjit Singh. Wall paintings under the Sikhs. In Mulk Raj Anand, Ed. Maharaja Ranjit Singh, as patron of the arts. Bombay: Marg Publications, 1981. Also in Darshan Singh, Ed. The Sikh art and architecture. Chandigarh: Panjab University, 1987, pp. 29–37.
- Kang, Kanwarjit Singh. Wood carving. In Maharaja Ranjit Singh, as patron of the arts. Bombay: Marg Publications, 1981
- Kang, Kanwarjit Singh and Nirmal Sandhu. Punjab murals. Chandigarh: Public Relations Department, Punjab, 1978. 16p. + plates.

== Awards ==
- W. G. Archer Award (1985) by the Punjab Lalit Kala Akademi
- Punjab Gaurav Sanmaan (2 February 2020) by the Punjab Arts Council
