= B. N. Goswamy =

Indian art critic (1933–2023)

- Born: Brijinder Nath Goswamy; 15 August 1933; Sargodha, Punjab Province, British India
- Died: 17 November 2023 (aged 90); Chandigarh, India
- Occupations: Art historian and critic
- Spouse: Karuna Goswamy
- Children: 1 daughter; 1 son
- Parent: B. L. Goswamy
- Awards: Padma Shri; Padma Bhushan

Academic background
- Education: Panjab University

Academic work
- Institutions: Panjab University

Brijinder Nath Goswamy (15 August 1933 – 17 November 2023) was an Indian art critic, art historian, and vice chairman of the Sarabhai Foundation of Ahmedabad, which runs the Calico Museum of Textiles. Goswamy was best known for his scholarship on Pahari and Punjabi and Sikh art, and Indian miniature paintings in general. He was the author of over 20 books on arts and culture, including Sakti Burman: A Private Universe, a monograph on the life and works of Sakti Burman, renowned Bengali painter and Masters of Indian Painting 1100-1900, a treatise on Indian miniature art. The Government of India awarded him the fourth highest civilian award of the Padma Shri in 1998 and followed it up with the third highest honour of the Padma Bhushan in 2008. He had a M.A. and Ph.D. in History from Panjab University.

== Biography ==
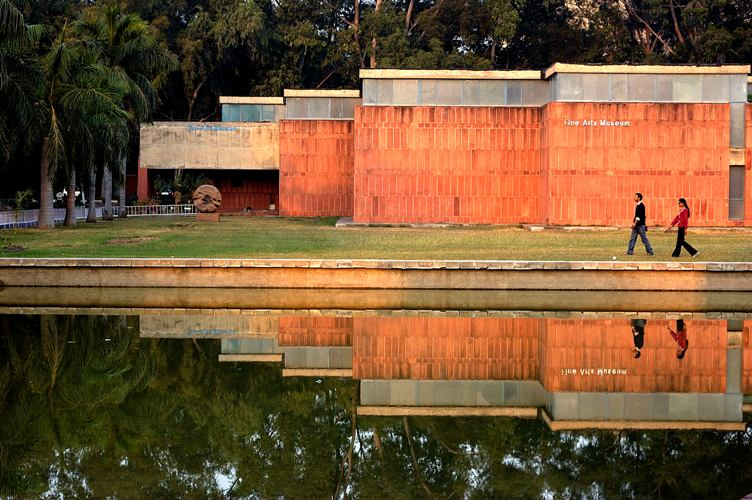
Museum of Fine Arts, Panjab University

Brijinder Nath Goswamy was born on 15 August 1933 at Sargodha of the Punjab province (presently in Pakistan) of British India, to B.L. Goswamy, a District and Sessions Judge. After the partition of Punjab in 1947, his family settled in Hoshiarpur. After the early schooling at various schools in the province, he did his intermediate studies at the Hindu College, Amritsar and secured his master's degree from Panjab University in 1954. He joined the Indian Administrative Service in 1956 and after working in the Bihar cadre for two years, he resigned from the service in 1958 to continue his studies in art. He returned to Panjab University and did research on Kangra painting of the lower Himalayas and its social backdrop, under the guidance of the renowned historian, Hari Ram Gupta, to obtain a doctoral degree (PhD) in 1961. It is reported that his examiners were Arthur Llewellyn Basham, the Indologist, and the art critic, W. G. Archer.

In 1962, he joined Panjab University as a Professor of Art History for its faculty of art history (Department of Fine Arts), where he would spend his entire career and eventually superannuate as a professor. While working there, he took a break and worked as a visiting professor at the South Asian Institute of the University of Heidelberg from 1973 till 1981. He also served as a visiting professor at various other international universities such as California, Berkeley, Pennsylvania, Los Angeles, Austin, and Zurich. He curated major exhibitions of Indian art at the Rietberg Museum (Zurich) and the Metropolitan Museum (New York). At Panjab University, he developed the Museum of Fine Arts, as its director, and the museum holds 1200 creations of contemporary Indian art. In 1967, he wrote his first book titled The Mughals and the Jogis of Jakhbar with J. S. Grewal. A second work by him followed the next year with Pahari Painting: The Family as the Basis of Style (1968). He later produced the work Piety and Splendour: Sikh Heritage in Art covering Sikh arts as a catalogue for an exhibition of the same name, held at the National Museum, New Delhi to mark to tricentenary of the establishment of the Khalsa in 1999. The exhibition and catalogue covers art of the Sikh gurus, including relics such as a chola associated with Guru Nanak. Other works he authored on Punjabi history and Sikh art include The Mughal and Sikh Rulers and the Vaishnavas of Pindori (with J. S. Grewal) and I See No Stranger: Early Sikh Art and Devotion (with Caron Smith).

Besides his academic career, he served as the vice chairman of the Centre for Cultural Resources and Training (CCRT), a nodal agency under the Government of India providing training to educators who are involved in educational programmes on Indian culture. He had been a member of the Governing Committee of the Indian Council of Historical Research (ICHR) and had chaired the Chandigarh Lalit Kala Akademi.

He lived in Chandigarh, where he died on 17 November 2023, at the age of 90. His last book The Indian Cat was released a month before his death.

== Marriage and children ==
Goswamy was married to Karuna, an art historian, academic, and a former professor of Panjab University. The couple had one son and one daughter, Apurva and Malavika.

== Legacy ==
Goswamy is considered by many as one of the most prominent scholars of Indian miniature painting. He is known to have specialised knowledge of Pahari painting, a genre of traditional miniature painting originated in the hills of Punjab region. His 1968 article, Pahari Painting: The Family as the Basis of Style, is a study of this genre, where he is reported to have been successful in unearthing the genealogy of renowned miniaturists such as Pandit Seu, Nainsukh and Manaku. He published five books on this topic, Nainsukh of Guler: A Great Indian Painter from a Small Hill-State, Pahari Masters: Court Painters of Northern India Painters at the Sikh Court, Essence of Indian Art and Masters of Indian Painting 1100-1900. Collaborating with Eberhard Fischer, the Padma Shri winning Swiss-based German art historian and the co-author of a few of his books, he has staged a series of shows, under the title, Wonder of the Age, in many parts of the world.

His work, The Spirit of Indian Painting: Close Encounters with 101 Great Works, 1100-1900 is a treatise on selected creations from Jain manuscripts to Indian miniatures. He has published 20 books to date, apart from several articles he has published in Indian and international journals and magazines. A Jainesque Sultanate Shahnama and the context of pre-Mughal painting in India, A Place Apart: Painting in Kutch, 1720-1820, Painted visions: The Goenka collection of Indian paintings, Ranga Roopa Gods, Words, Images, The Word is Sacred, Sacred is the Word: The Indian Manuscript Tradition, Domains of Wonder: Selected Masterworks of Indian Painting and I See No Stranger: Sikh Early Art and Devotion, are some of his other notable books. A Layered World is a 40,000-word audio-visual presentation prepared by Goswamy for Chandigarh Lalit Kala Akademi. He also wrote a regular column in The Tribune, titled Art n Soul and delivered keynote addresses and lectures, in India and abroad.

Students of Goswamy include Kanwarjit Singh Kang and Subhash Parihar.

== Awards and honours ==
When Goswamy retired from his academic career, Panjab University made him the Emeritus Professor. He held the Jawaharlal Nehru Fellowship from 1969 to 1970 and the Sarabhai Fellowship in 1994. He was also a Mellon Senior Fellow of the National Humanities Center, North Carolina. The Government of India awarded him the civilian honour of the Padma Shri in 1998. He was again included in the Republic Day Honours list in 2008, this time for the third highest honour of the Padma Bhushan.

== Selected bibliography ==
- Goswamy, B. N.; Grewal, Jagtar Singh (1967). The Mughals and the Jogis of Jakhbar. Shimla: Indian Institute of Advanced Study.
- B. N. Goswamy (September 1968). "Pahari Painting: The Family as the Basis of Style". Marg. XXI (4).
- B. N. Goswamy (1975). Painters at the Sikh Court. F. Steiner. p. 146. ISBN 9783515020978.
- B.N. Goswamy; Anna L. Dallapiccola (1984). A Place Apart: Painting in Kutch, 1720-1820. Oxford University Press. p. 94. ISBN 978-0195613117.
- B. N. Goswamy (1986). Essence of Indian Art. Asian Art Museum of San Francisco. ISBN 9780939117000.
- B. N. Goswamy (1988). A Jainesque Sultanate Shahnama and the context of pre-Mughal painting in India (Rietberg series on Indian art). Museum Rietberg. p. 71. ISBN 978-3907070222.
- B. N. Goswamy (1999). Painted visions: The Goenka collection of Indian paintings. Lalit Kala Akademi. p. 297. ISBN 978-8187507000.
- Goswamy, B. N. (2000). Piety and Splendour: Sikh Heritage in Art. New Delhi: National Museum.
- B. N. Goswamy; Caron Smith (2005). Domains of Wonder: Selected Masterworks of Indian Painting. San Diego Museum of Art. p. 304. ISBN 978-0937108345.
- B. N. Goswamy; Caron Smith (2006). I See No Stranger: Sikh Early Art and Devotion. Mapin Publishing. p. 216. ISBN 978-1890206048.
- B. N. Goswamy (2008). The Word is Sacred, Sacred is the Word: The Indian Manuscript Tradition. Philip Wilson Publishers. p. 204. ISBN 978-0856676536.
- B. N. Goswamy (2010). Ranga Roopa Gods, Words, Images. Niyogi Books. p. 100. ISBN 978-8189738631.
- Milo Beach; B. N. Goswamy; Eberhard Fischer (2011). Masters of Indian Painting 1100-1900. University of Washington Press. p. 800. ISBN 9783907077504.
- B.N. Goswamy; Eberhard Fischer (2012). Pahari Masters: Court Painters of Northern India. Niyogi Books. p. 392. ISBN 978-8189738464.
- B. N. Goswamy; Eberhard Fischer (2012). Nainsukh of Guler: A Great Indian Painter from a Small Hill-State. Niyogi Books. p. 304. ISBN 978-8189738761.
- B. N. Goswamy (2014). The Spirit of Indian Painting: Close Encounters with 101 Great Works, 1100-1900. Penguin India. p. 560. ISBN 978-0670086573.
- Brijinder Nath Goswamy; Rosa Maria Falva (2015). Rosa Maria Falva (ed.). Sakti Burman: A Private Universe. Skira. p. 216. ISBN 978-8857226194.
- B. N. Goswamy. Manaku of Guler: The Life and Work of another great Indian Painter from a small Hill State. Niyogi Books. p. 512. ISBN 978-9385285820.
- Goswamy, B. N. (2023). The Indian Cat: Stories, Paintings, Poetry, and Proverbs. Aleph. ISBN 9789395853309.

== See also ==
- K. C. Aryan
- Calico Museum of Textiles
- Eberhard Fischer
- Sakti Burman
- Arthur Llewellyn Basham
- Nainsukh
