= Eberhard Fischer (art historian) =

Swiss art historian and museologist

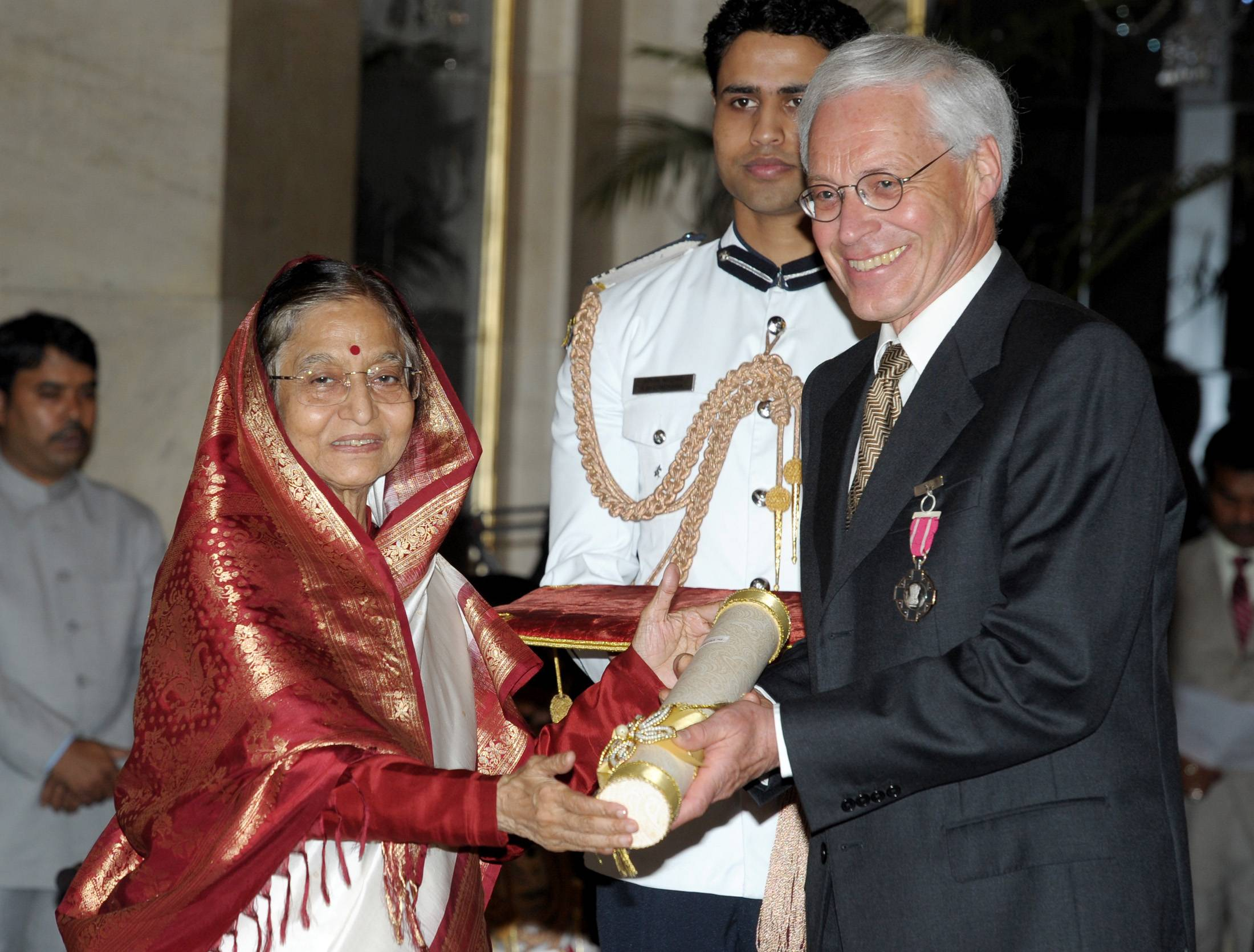
- The President, Smt. Pratibha Devisingh Patil presenting the Padma Shri Award to Dr. Eberhard Fischer, at an Investiture Ceremony-II, at Rashtrapati Bhavan, in New Delhi on 4 April 2012.
- Born: 15 October 1941 (age 84); Berlin, Germany
- Occupations: Art historian, museologist
- Awards: Padma Shri
- Website: Official web site

Eberhard Fischer (born 15 October 1941) is a German art historian, ethnologist and author based in Switzerland. He is a former Director and the incumbent President of Rietberg Society, Switzerland. Fischer was honored by the Government of India, in 2012, with the fourth highest Indian civilian award of Padma Shri.

== Biography ==
Eberhard Fischer was born in Berlin, Germany on 15 October 1941. He is an ethnologist and art historian who is known to have researched on the heritages of India and other African and Asian places. He is a former director of Rietberg Society and serves as its president. He is also the Secretary General of the Swiss-Liechtenstein Foundation for Archaeological Research Abroad (SLSA). Fischer has authored several books on art and ethnic heritage and has contributed to the publication of many others. He has also produced Nainsukh, a 90 mins feature film in Dogri language with English subtitles, in 2010, with filmmaker Amit Dutta . The Government of India awarded him the civilian honor of Padma Shri in 2012. After receiving the award on 4 April 2012, Fischer donated his collection of over 40 books to Jawaharlal Nehru University, Delhi.

== Awards ==
- 2012: Received the fourth highest Indian civilian award of Padma Shri.

== See also ==
- Haku Shah
- Rietberg Museum
