= Stuart Cary Welch =

American historian of Islamic art (1928–2008)

Stuart Cary Welch, Jr.
- Born: Stuart Cary Welch, Jr. April 2, 1928; Buffalo, New York, New York (State), U.S.
- Died: August 13, 2008 (aged 80); Hokkaido, Japan
- Education: Harvard University
- Occupation: curator
- Parent(s): Stuart Cary Welch, Sr. Harriet Frances Mack

Stuart Cary Welch Jr. (2 April 1928 – 13 August 2008) was an American scholar and curator of Indian and Islamic art.

== Life and career ==
Welch was born to a prominent family in Buffalo, New York. His maternal grandfather, Norman Edward Mack, was publisher of The Buffalo Times. He began collecting drawings by Indian artists as a boy. He earned a bachelor's degree in fine arts from Harvard University in 1950, then did graduate work there in classical art. Because they offered no Indian or Islamic art courses at the time, he became an autodidact.

His first paid position at Harvard was in 1956, as honorary assistant keeper of Islamic Art at the Fogg Museum. He later developed one of the first curricula for Islamic and Indian art. He was curator of Islamic and Later Indian art at the Harvard Art Museum, and from 1979 to 1987, he was also special consultant for the department of Islamic art at the Metropolitan Museum of Art. Welch taught at Harvard until his retirement in 1995, and he donated much of his collection to the school. A resident of New Hampshire, Welch died of a heart attack while traveling in Hokkaido, Japan.

The remainder of his personal collection was auctioned by Sotheby's in 2011. On 6 April 2011, a single page from the Shahnameh of Shah Tahmasp (The Houghton Shahnameh) of which Welch was the leading scholar, was sold for 7.4 million pounds ($12 million).

== Selected publications ==
- Royal Persian Manuscripts, Thames & Hudson, 1976, ISBN 0-500-27074-0
- Room for Wonder: Indian Painting During the British Period, 1760-1880. American Federation of Arts, 1978
- Imperial Mughal Painting. Braziller, 1978
- The Houghton Shahnameh (with Martin Bernard Dickson). Harvard University, 1981
