= Milo C. Beach =

American art historian

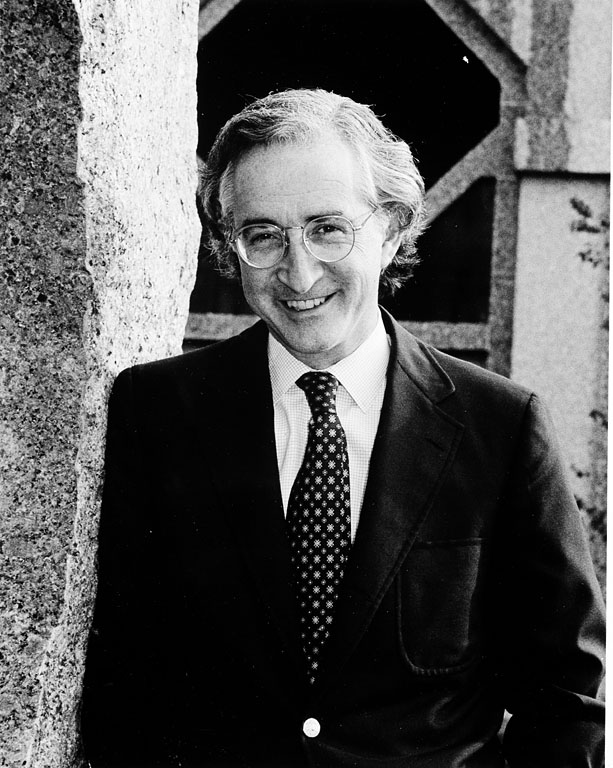
Milo C. Beach in 1986

Milo Cleveland Beach is an American art historian and the former director of the Arthur M. Sackler Gallery and the Freer Gallery of Art.

Beach is a historian of Indian art, specifically Indian painting. He graduated from Harvard College and credits the music of Ravi Shankar for garnering his interest in Indian culture. Before earning his Ph.D. at Harvard, he was already a curator at the Fogg Art Museum and Boston Museum of Fine Arts. He is an authority on Mughal painting of the Akbar to Shah Jahan periods and has published important catalogues on the subject including The Grand Mogul: Imperial Painting in India 1600-1660 (Williamstown, 1978), now a classic in its field.

He served as the chair of the art department at Williams College. He became director of the Smithsonian Institution's Arthur M. Sackler Gallery in 1987. He supervised the opening of the Sackler Gallery and acquired loans for the opening exhibitions from the government of China, the Queen of the United Kingdom, Elizabeth II, Emperor Shōwa, the Topkapi Museum, and the Hermitage Museum. A $26 million renovation of the Freer also took place during his tenure. Beach curated numerous exhibitions, including the collection of painter Howard Hodgkin, Japanese pop art, the art of Hiroshima Kazuo, and contemporary pottery.

In 1993, Beach published his research on the British Royal Collection's 17th-century manuscript of the Padshahnama. The Royal Librarian described the publication as the "best catalogue ever produced for an exhibition from Windsor Castle." In October, 2001, Beach retired as the director of both the Sackler and the Freer Gallery of Art. Beach returned to research, specifically focusing on the work of the Mughal Empire.
