= Rajput painting =

Art style that evolved in the courts of Rajputana in India

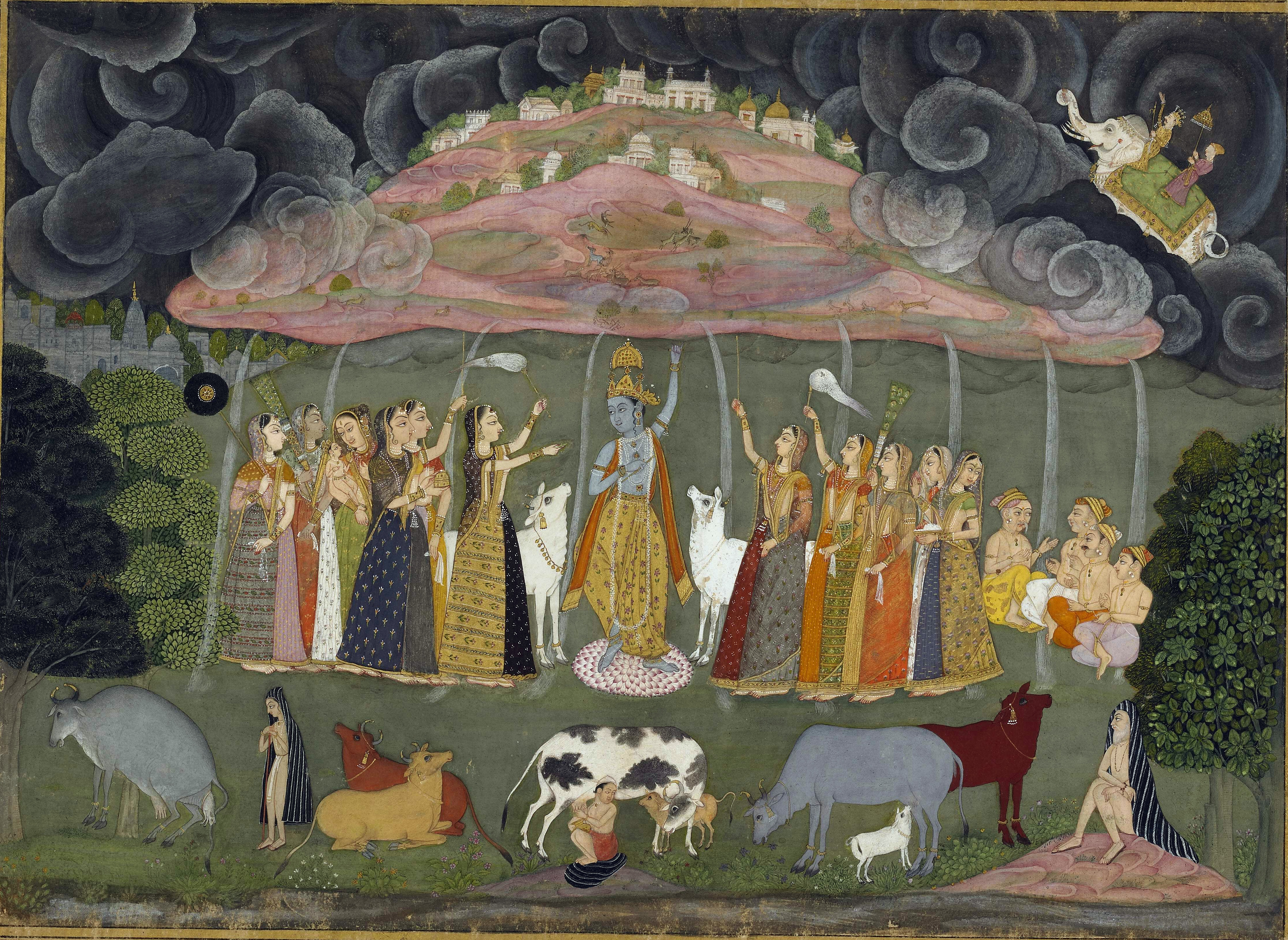
Krishna lifts Mount Govardhan by Ustad Sahibdin. Bikaner, c. 1690. British Museum.

Rajput painting, painting of the regional Hindu courts during the Mughal era, roughly from the end of the 16th century to the middle of the 19th century. Traditionally, Rajput painting is further divided into Rajasthan and Pahari painting which flourished in two different areas "far apart from each other in terms of distance but all under the rule of Rajput chiefs, and bound together by a common culture".

The nomenclature 'Rajput painting' was introduced by Ananda Coomaraswamy in his book Rajput Painting, Being an Account of the Hindu Paintings of Rajasthan and the Panjab Himalayas (1916), which was the first monography of the subject. Rajput painting evolved from the Hindu painting of the 16th century (sometimes called "Early Rajput Painting"), which substantially changed under the influence of Mughal painting. Different styles of Rajput painting range from conservative idioms that preserve traditional values of bright colour, flatness and abstract form (e.g. Mewar and Basohli) to those showing greater Mughal impact in their refinement and cool colour (e.g. Bikaner and Kangra). But despite absorption of the new techniques and subjects from Mughals (and also, to a lesser extent, from European and Deccan painting), Rajput artists never lost their own distinct identity, which manifested itself especially in Indian predilection to universal rather than individual. Local styles of Rajput painting developed in the 17th century, when Mughal painting dominated over Indian art. In the 18th century, Mughal school was only one of the many among regional schools of painting and Rajput art was much more important in its overall output. In the 19th century, with political decline of Rajput states and rising influence of Western painting and photography, Rajput painting gradually ceased to exist.

== Background: Painting in North India before Mughals. ==
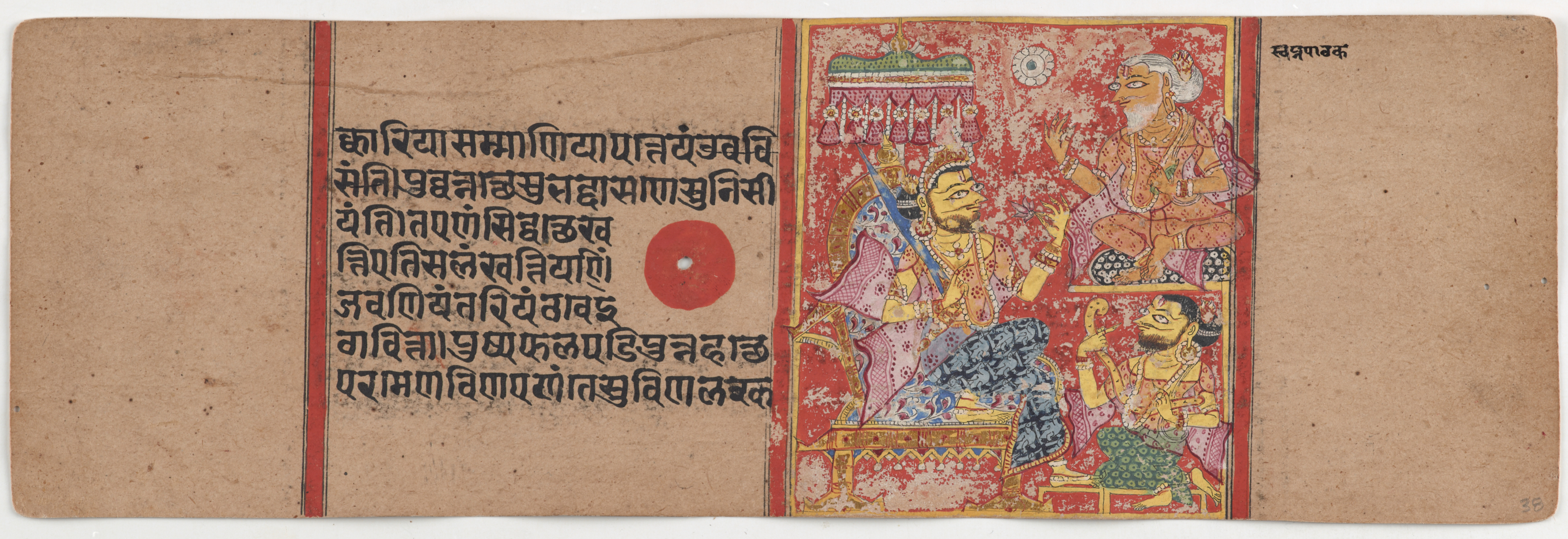
A King converses, Folio from the Kalpa Sūtra and Kalakacharya Katha. Gujarat, 1411. Arthur M. Sackler Gallery.

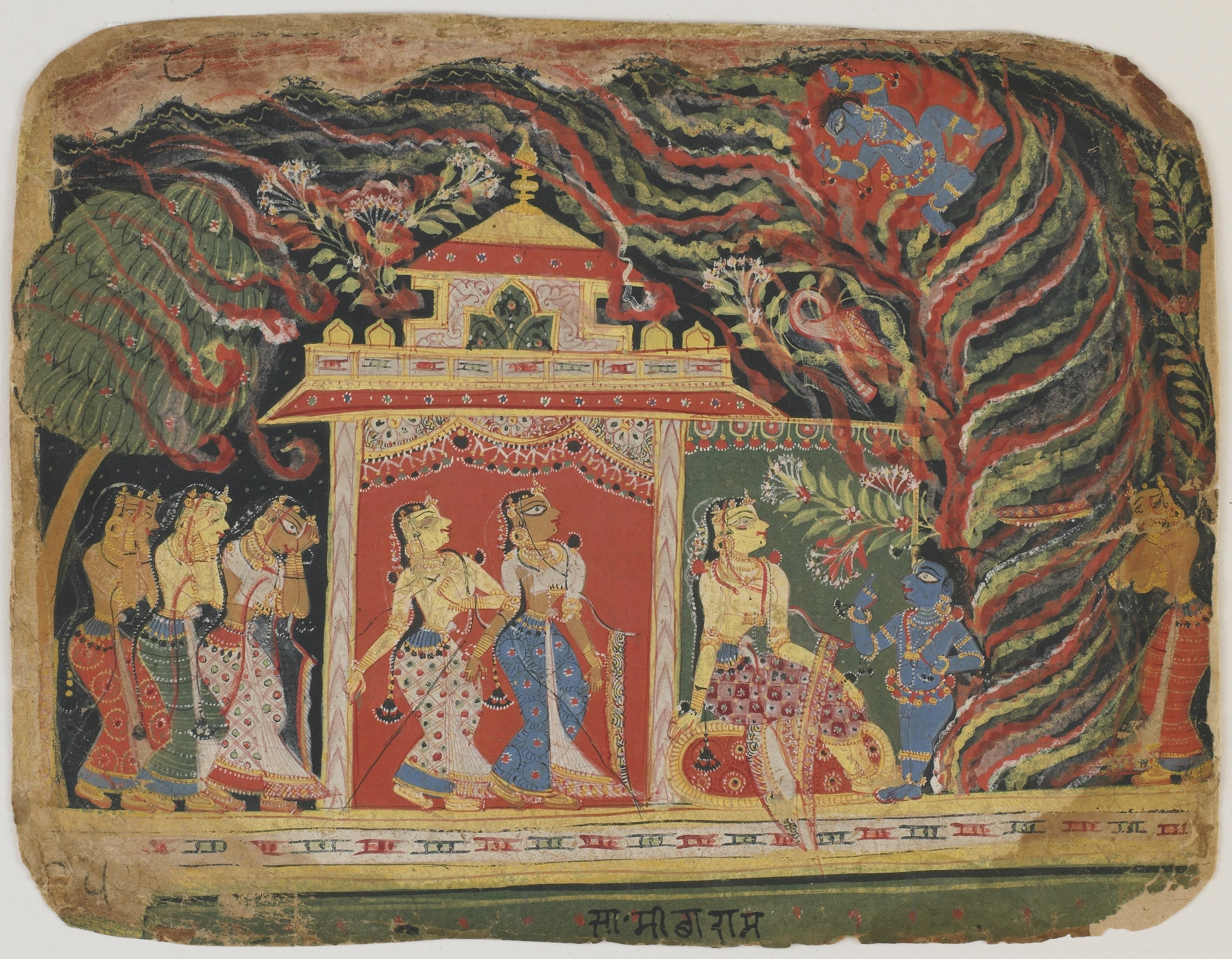
Krishna defeats Trinavarta, folio from the "Dispersed" Bhagavata Purana. North India, c. 1520. Freer Gallery of Art.

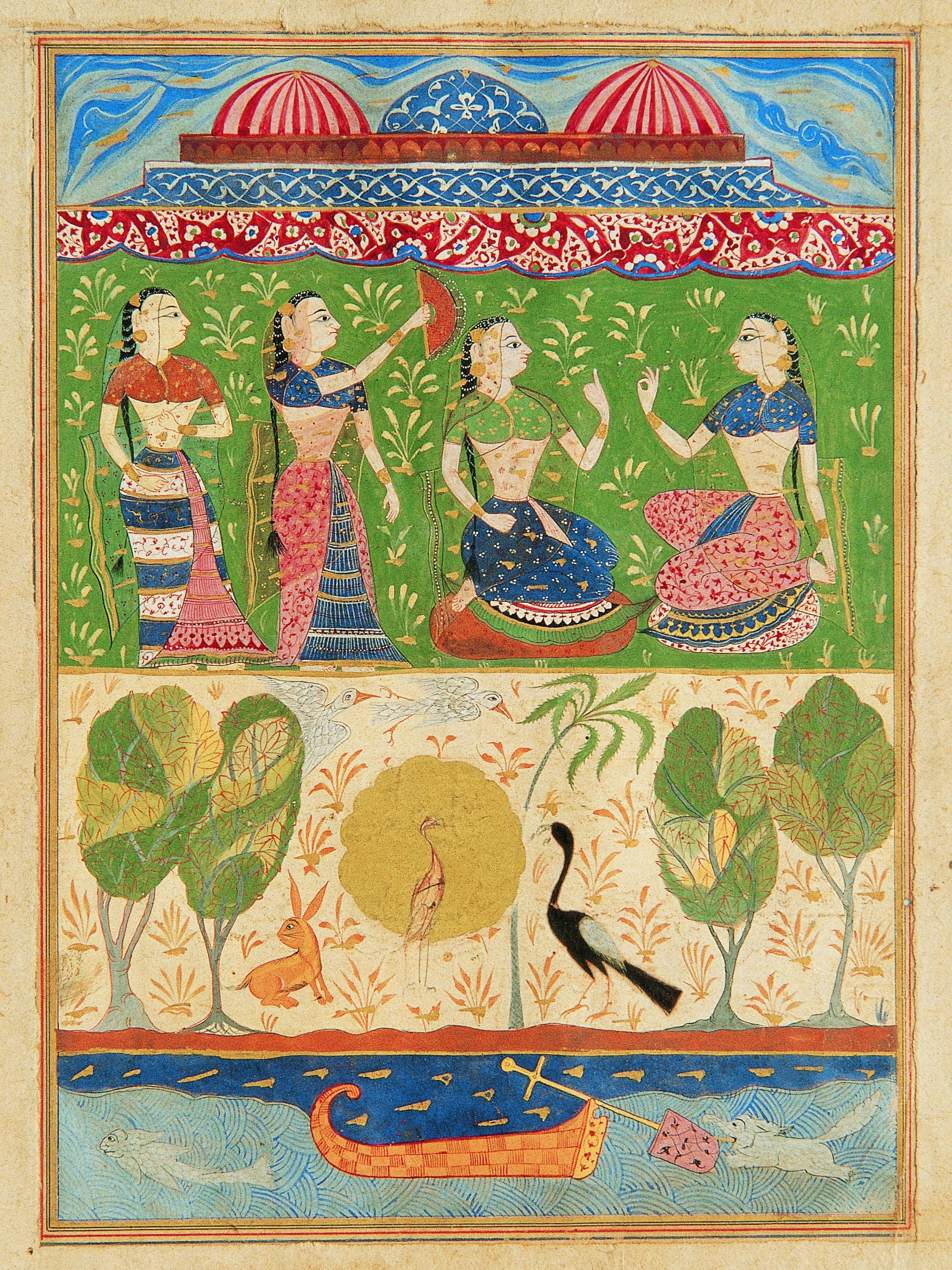
Chanda talking to a Friend, Folio from a Chandayana. Probably Delhi – Jaunpur belt, c. 1525–1575. Chhatrapati Shivaji Maharaj Vastu Sangrahalaya.

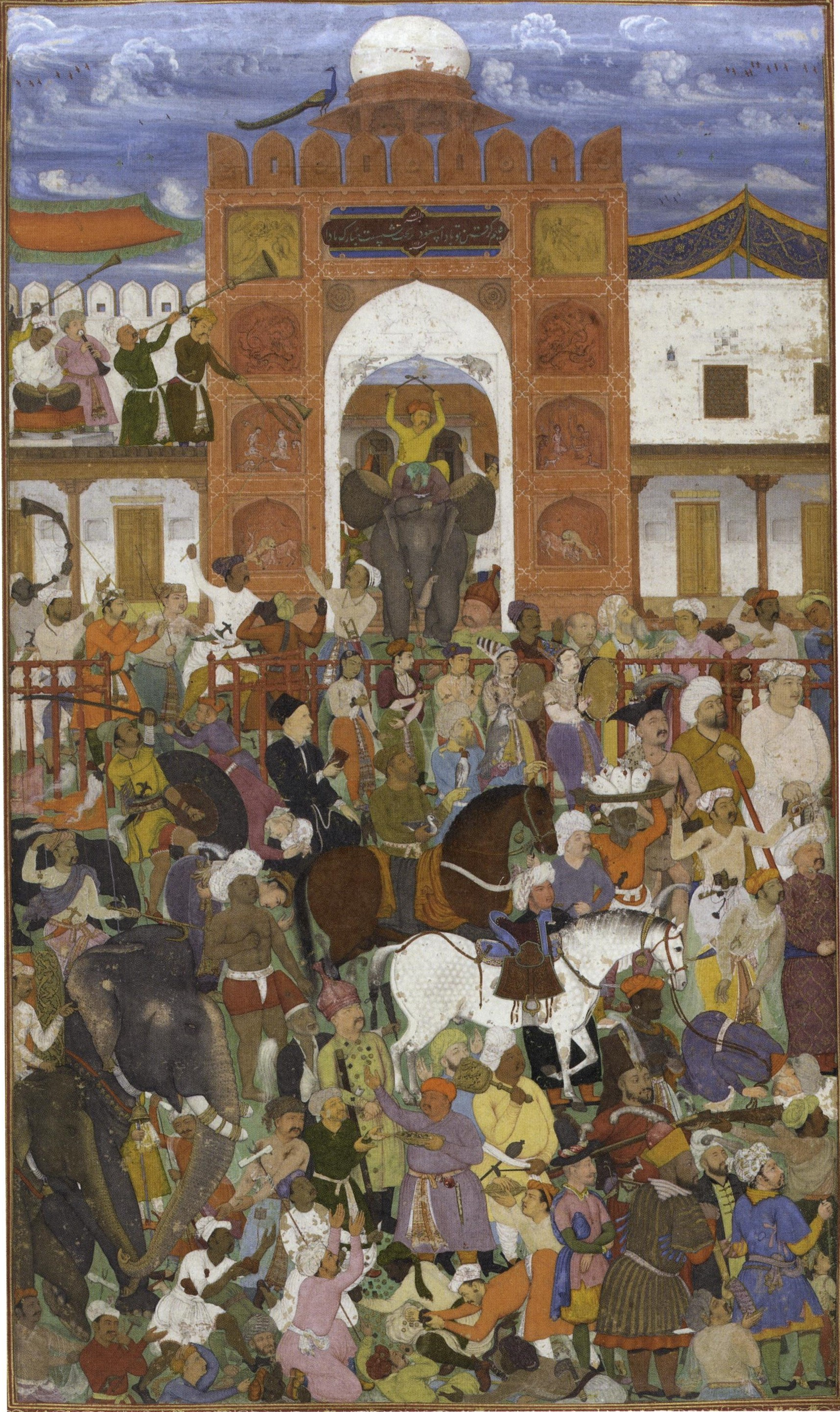
Nauroz durbar of Jahangir by Abu'l-Hasan, Folio from the St. Petersburg Album. Agra, c. 1610–18. Institute of Oriental Manuscripts of the Russian Academy of Sciences.

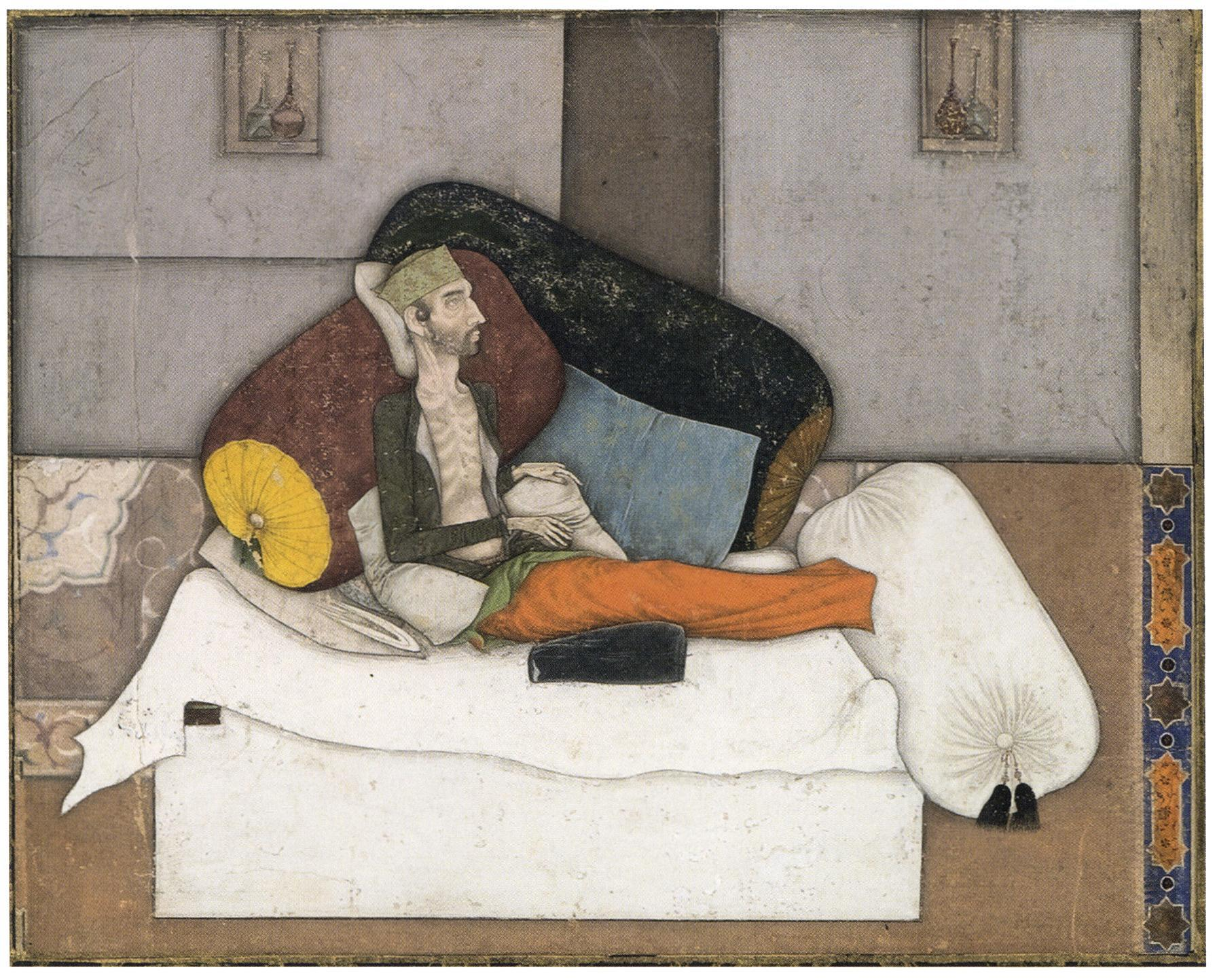
The Dying Inayat Khan by Balchand. Agra, 1618. Bodleian Library.

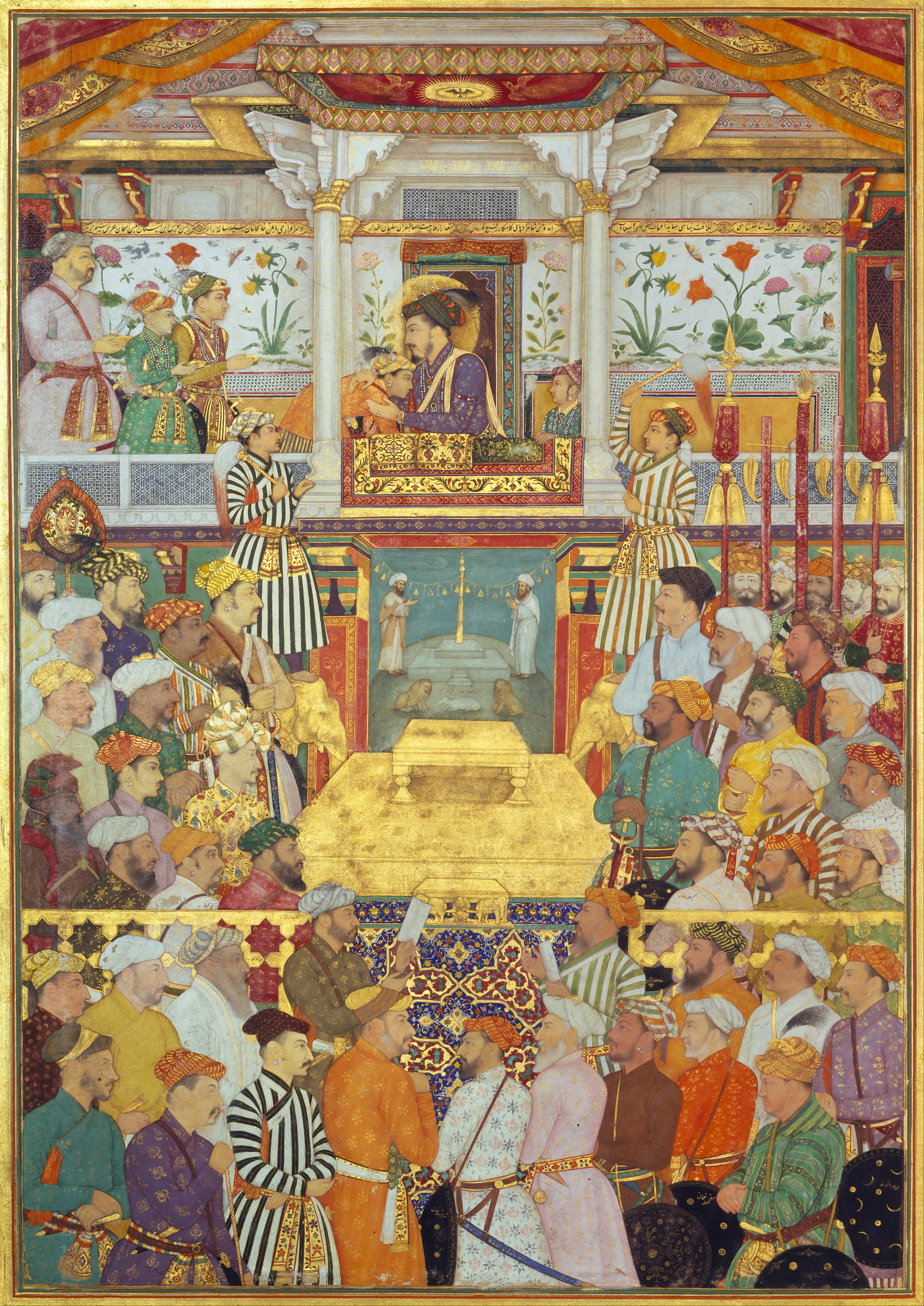
The accession of Shah Jahan by Bichitr, part of the Windsor Padshahnama. Circa 1628. Royal Collection.

=== Jain tradition ===
Dominant form of the Indian painting in late medieval period was manuscript painting and the earliest Indian books were "usually on pages made from leaves of the talipot palm; long and horizontal in format, the pages were pierced and threaded onto cords tied between wooden covers. The occasional illustrations were small and usually square". The term for such a book is pustaka in Sanskrit and pothī in Hindi. Despite the fact that paper became plentiful in India after about 1400 traditional format change very slowly and usually the loose paper pages were wrapped in cloth and tied in bundles.

Painting in North India at the beginning of the 16th century can be divided into three different categories: Jain (Western Indian), Hindu (Early Rajput) and Muslim. First of these was common in Western India (especially Gujarat) and the texts illustrated usually relate to Jainism, with copies of the Kalpa Sūtra and Kālakācārya Kathā commissioned most often. In Western Indian miniatures colors were very limited and applied in flat, clearly bounded areas; profiles, postures and gestures were sharp and angular; and compositions were broken down into small compartments with strongly colored flat backgrounds. These can be taken as general characteristics of indigenous Indian painting styles of the time – distinctive traits of Jain painting include the wiry, vital line drawing, far less robust and energetic colors than in Hindu group and the very repetitive character of the scenes in many manuscripts (see illustration of A King converses). Foreign men are sometimes depicted with the three-quarter profile and formulaic facial features common in Persian painting. However, this visible awareness of other styles did not necessarily lead to the development of new attitudes to pictorial space or compositional format.

=== Hindu tradition ===
Hindu painting on the eve of the Mughal period is best represented by a series of Bhagavata Purana illustrations. In a Krishna defeats Trinavarta (see illustration) among the already mentioned features common with Jain tradition we find also that all figures are in profile and each figure is constructed according to the same formula. We are dealing with types, not individuals. There is no attempt at a three -dimensional space and the artist is indifferent to technical expertise or the subtlety and variety of colors. We are presented with multiple moments or aspects of the event, but the successive episodes are not in visually linear sequence, because there is no attempt to make the moment seem unique, not to separate and distinguish individual forms in an empty space.

A second important series of illustrations from this period is associated with the erotic poem Caurapañcāśikā. It was discovered earlier than Bhagavata Purana series and "has given its name to this broad stylistic category of pre-Mughal Hindu painting in art-historical writings". Miniatures from the Caurapañcāśikā follow most of the traits of the Bhagavata Purana illustrations. Space is used metaphorically, not to provide a convincing physical setting, and objects do not seem to obey physical laws. The textiles are almost weightless. Women with impossibly large bosoms, tiny waists, and ample hips perfectly accord with traditional Indian ideals of beauty. Illustrations of Caurapañcāśikā are far more sophisticated in style than those of Bhagavata Purana, but it is the latter that was more influential at the Mughal court. Style of this group of works was called recently "Early Rajput Style".

=== Muslim tradition of the sultanate period ===
Muslims brought with them books on paper, bound along a spine, usually vertical and often encased in leather covers. Islamic rulers were interested in illustrated copies of Persian texts and for them painting was a court art. Books became an emblem of wealth and power, which meant that Muslim patrons demanded opulence of materials, fine craftsmanship, and continual stylistic and narrative novelty, for painting was also a form of personal entertainment. There is no evidence that Jain or Hindu painters had earlier worked exclusively for particular or single patrons, which may not have been economically feasible. "The Muslim rulers, however, formed kitabkhanas (library workshops) within their palaces, and artists and artisans often worked for specific employers. [...] Thus they painted to please a single person, rather than to reflect the general needs of a community, and this demanded sensitivity and responsiveness to a patron's individual and often highly idiosyncratic taste."

The great centre of Islamic art in Central India at the end of the 15th century was Malwa Sultanate under the rule of Ghiyath Shah (r. 1469–1500), who commissioned Nimatnama-i-Nasiruddin-Shahi, the most important royal manuscript made in his capital, Mandu. Miniatures of Nimatnama are good examples of Islamic painting in India of this era. The style of Nimatnama illustrations derives in part from contemporary painting in Iran, but one of its important aspects is its provincialism. "Some pages seem simply naive continuations of Iranian style, probably by Indian artists who did not fully understand the Iranian visual conventions they were directed to adopt. Other Nimatnama folios present a far more important combination of Iranian and Indian stylistic traits, and seems to predict the artistic character of early Mughal manuscripts." Mixture of Jain, Hindu and Persian styles in Nimatnama failed to produce any influential style of its own, but its best illustrations are extremely animated, both visually and narratively, and its characters are among the liveliest figures in Indian painting.

Two of the most important undated and unprovenanced Sultanate manuscripts of the period (one in CSMVS and another in John Rylands Library) are both of the same text, the Chandayana of Maulana Da'ud. The silhouetted figures with profile heads of the Nimatnama reoccur, but this time always standing on bases in front of a decorative background. Contrary to Iranian tradition every single folio bears a painting and "the density of narrative illustration is such that the text has become superfluous".

=== Mughal painting ===
The first evidence of Mughal artistic patronage emerges from the time of Humayun (1530–1556), who hired Iranian painters such as Abd al-Samad and Mir Sayyid Ali. Their works for the new patron were almost entirely Safavid in character, flat and highly decorative, with similarly sized figures spread throughout the page. The beginning of a distinctive Mughal style is associated with the Akbar Hamzanama, a manuscript of the Persian epic Hamzanama which originally consisted of 1400 69 cm × 54 cm paintings on cloth and took 15 or more years to complete (from around 1562 to 1577). Both the physical appearance of the manuscript and its extent are unprecedented in Islamic painting. Such large cycles of paintings, however, and the arrangement of every folio being illustrated are found in earlier Indian manuscripts. The earliest paintings of the Akbar Hamzanama remain Persian in character, with text panels at top and bottom, and painting treated as integral part of the text. The later paintings fill the entire page and they burst with energy and physicality (see illustration of Amr Disguised as Mazmahil the Surgeon Practices Quackery on the Sorcerers of Antali). They have started the integration of foreground and background and concentrate on the major figures of the story.

The next step in evolution of Mughal art involve influence of European painting, mainly through prints. In Seated Man by Basawan (see illustration) we can see how he use European figural modelling and consequent sense of spatial depth to explore physiognomy, character, texture of clothing and the way person positioned herself in space. When in Persian tradition human figure was an excuse to explore the beauty and independent expressiveness of line, for Mughal artists lines became tools to interpret personality.

This new Mughal naturalism further developed under the patronage of Jahangir (1605–1627). For Govardhan even figures in the marginal decoration of album (Muraqqa) pages where powerful character studies and "this flesh and blood quality [...] separate Mughal painting from its Iranian roots" because "it is Mughal painting alone that consistently recognizes, acknowledges and investigates the individuality and personal uniqueness of the people it portrays". An extreme example of Jahangir's unbounded curiosity and predilection to uncompromised naturalism is The Dying Inayat Khan by Balchand (see illustration), which exist only because a dying man, whose appearance seems interesting to the emperor, was made to pose for his portrait.

Moreover, Jahangir was interested in particular and recognizable character of the work of his artists. In his Jahangirnama he boasted that "my liking for painting and my practice in judging it have arrived at such a point that when any work is brought before me, either of deceased artists or those of the present day, without the names being told me, I say on the spur of the moment that is the work of such and such a man". This led to cultivation of individual artistic styles, and certain painters developed areas of expertise: Mansur as an animal and flower painter, Abu'l-Hasan and Bishandas as imperial portraitists, and Govardhan as a painter of holy men, musicians and eccentrics. Still, the pervasive mood was "the overwhelming dominance of the naturalism demanded by Jahangir". Even paintings of court scenes, like Nauroz durbar of Jahangir by Abu'l-Hasan (see illustration), were occasions to many individual studies of human characters.

Since the mid-16th century, many Mughal painters had been trying to bring painting closer to empirically perceived reality. This Mughal concern for objective distinctiveness and human individuality was a radical shift within both Islamic and Indian traditions, which celebrate rather universal than particular. Equally new was the idea that individual artist's styles should be considered recognizable and important. But already at the end of Jahangir's reign in Mughal art becomes visible another, more traditional trend. In paintings like Jahangir Preferring a Sufi Shaikh to Kings by Bichitr (Freer, F1942.15a) more important than description of rational, natural world becomes symbolic imagery and imperial decorum. This new style dominates during the reign of Shah Jahan (r. 1628–1658) and it culminates in paintings made for his Padshahnama. When for Abu'l-Hasan scene from imperial court was an occasion to delight in the variety and quirks of individual appearances, Bichitr in his The accession of Shah Jahan (see illustration) simply demonstrate the power of state ritual. In fact, the whole manuscript of Padshahnama abounds with such ritual enactments of imperial power and is far less personal than paintings from Jahangirnama. Court scenes are rendered static by the lack of contact between the Emperor, depicted as a superior being, always in profile and placed high on his throne platform, and the courtiers below. There is much less individuation of human figures, who are defined rather by their roles in society, than personal traits, and "it is a clear return to more traditionally Indian ideas of individual's subservience to an ultimate unity, and a major change of direction for the Mughal tradition. [...] it is no longer what separates [sic] men but what unites them that is important."

The next emperor, Aurangzeb (r. 1658–1707), wasn't interested in art, and Mughal painting declined. Formal portraits of the emperor and the nobility remained in demand, but they were created through the increasingly mechanical repetition of long established formulas. Later emperors showed greater interest in the arts than Aurangzeb, but the historical continuity of a distinctively Mughal painting style had ended. In accordance with Indian tradition, it had begun "to emphasize the universal aspects of the emperors, rather than their unique qualities, and to diminish the importance of the individualistic, innovative styles practiced by specific painters. What has been termed the decline of imperial Mughal art when viewed with the criteria of the European historian is also evidence of the assimilation finally of Mughal painting into the Indian artistic mainstream."

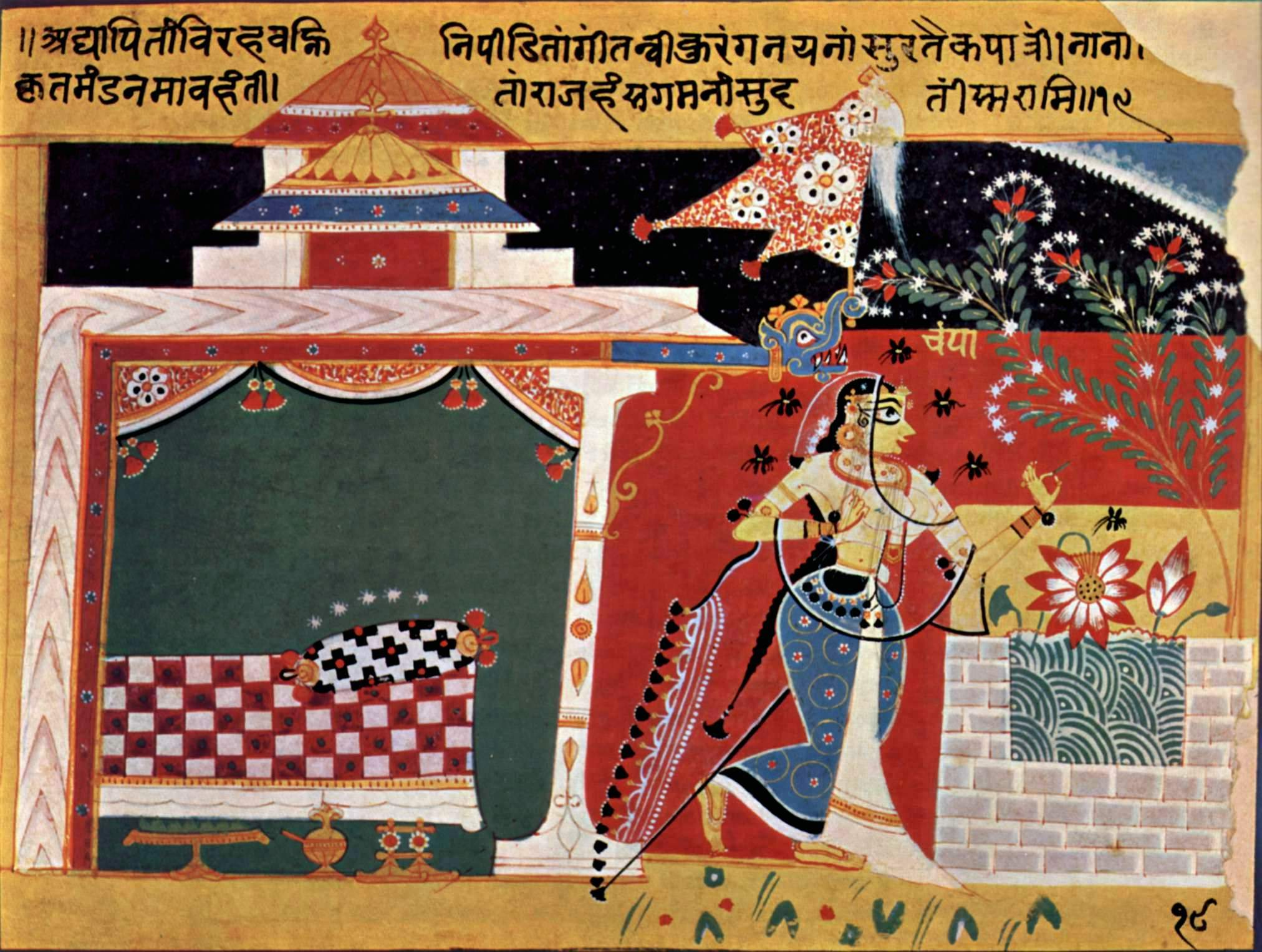
Remembering that Fawn-Eyed Beauty, Folio from a Caurapañcāśikā. North India, second quarter of the 16th century. Lalbhai Dalpatbhai Museum, N.C. Mehta Collection.

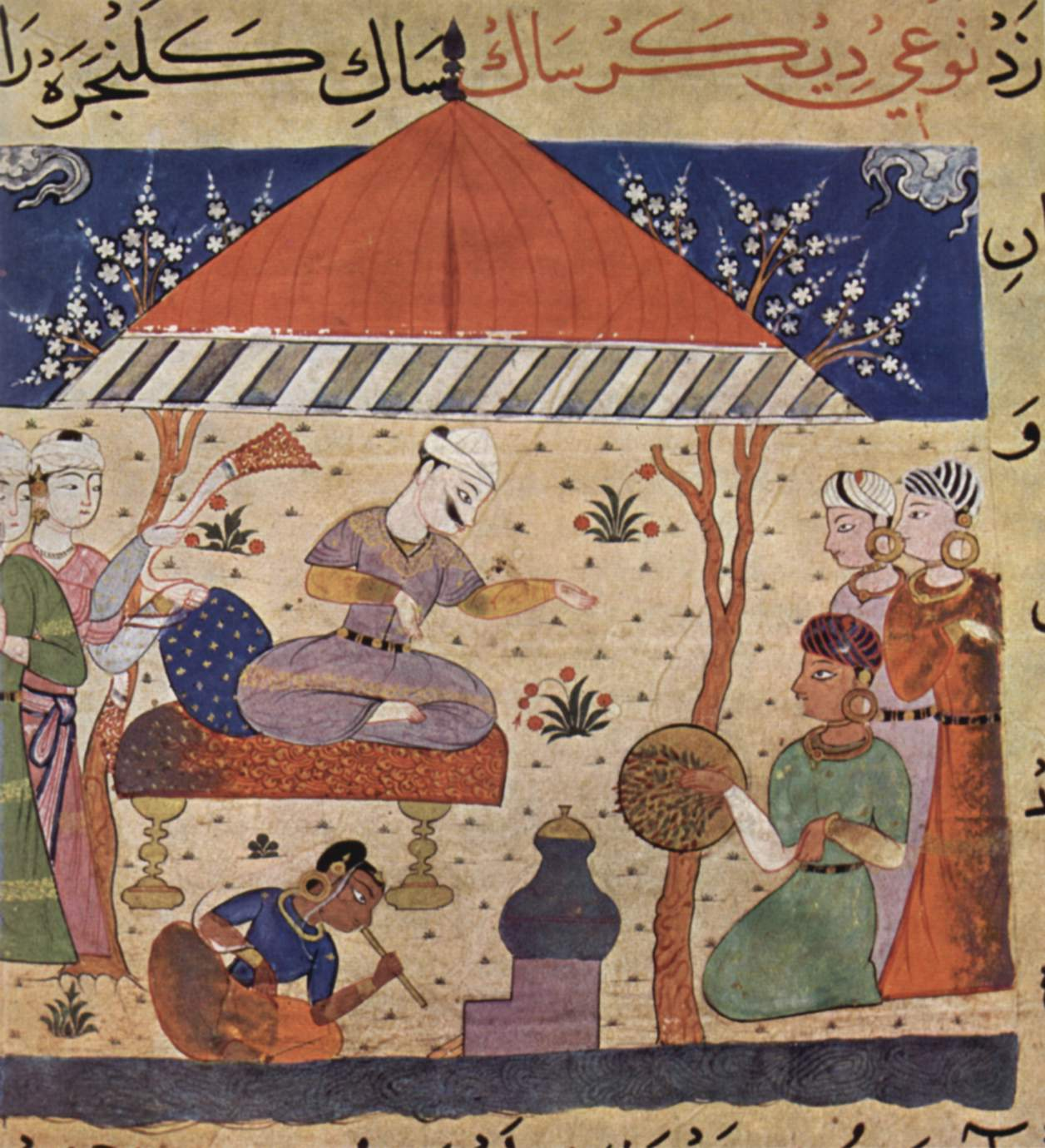
Ghiyas al-Din watches the process of cooking green vegetables, Folio from a Nimatnama-i-Nasiruddin-Shahi (detail). Malwa Sultanate, c. 1500. British Library.

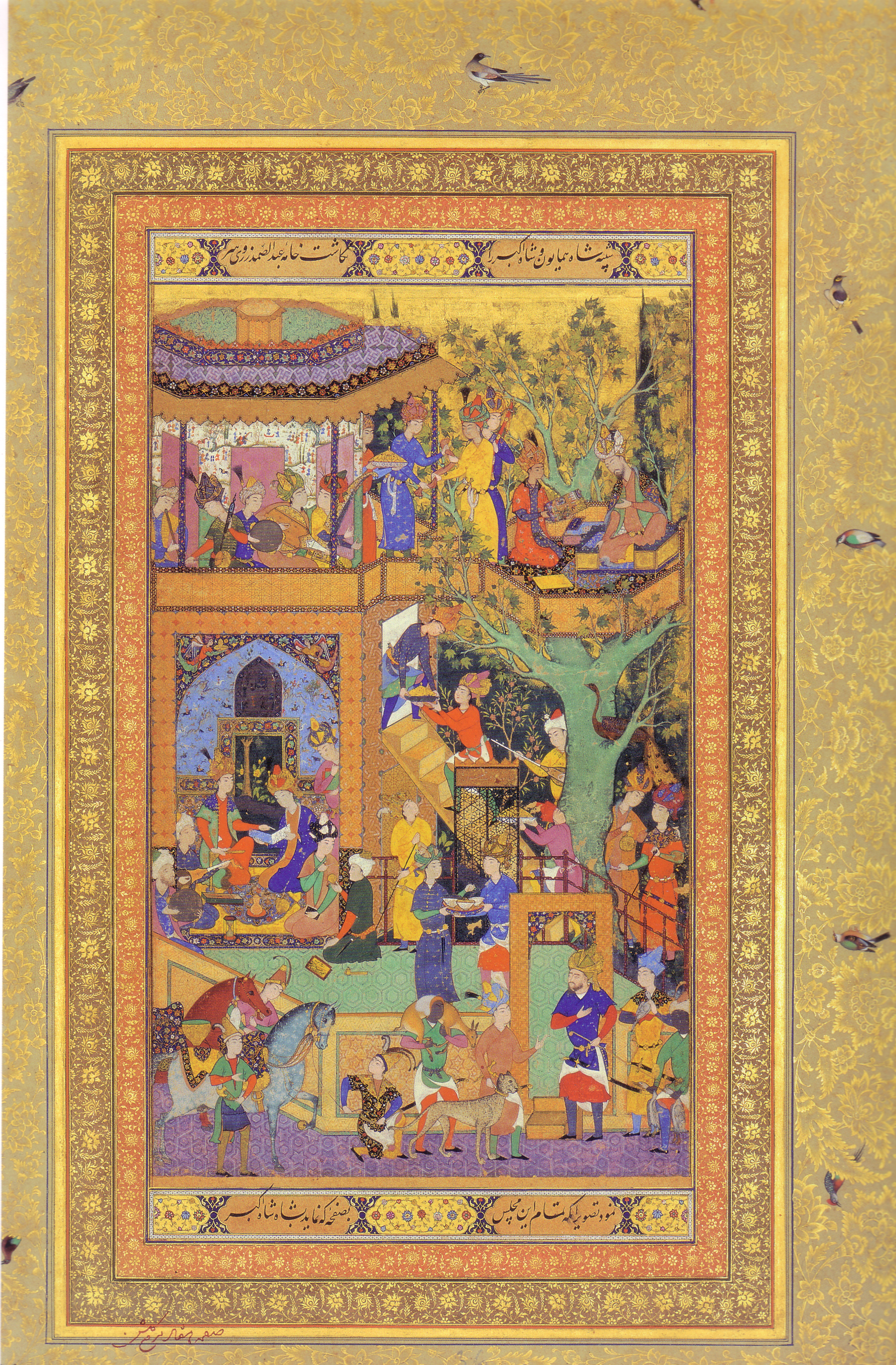
Akbar presenting a painting to his father Humayun by Abd al-Samad, Folio from the Golshan Album. Probably Kabul, 1550–1556. Golestan Palace Library.

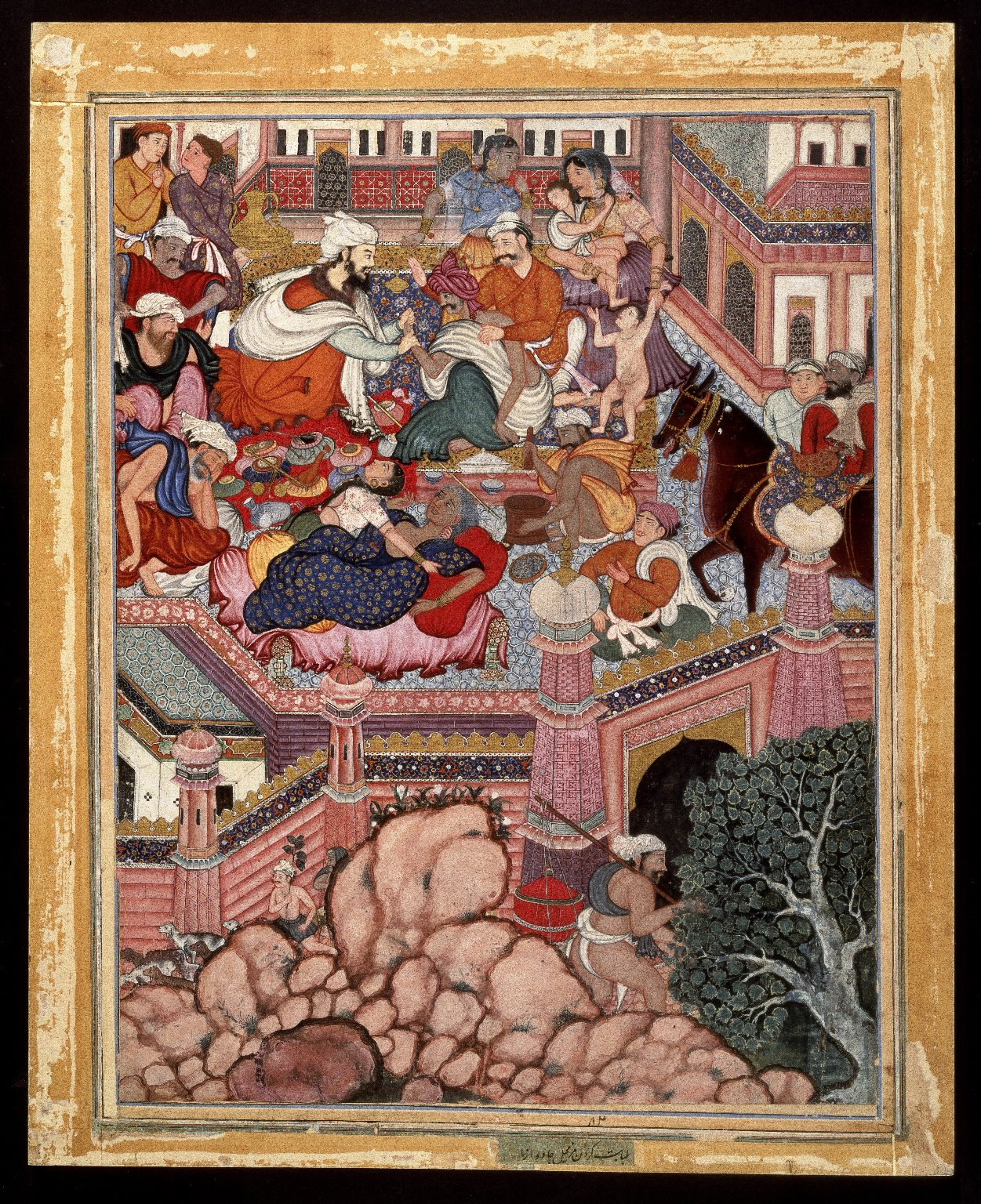
Amr Disguised as Mazmahil the Surgeon Practices Quackery on the Sorcerers of Antali, Folio from the Hamzanama. Attributed to Daswanth, Sharavana and Mahesh. Between 1562 and 1577. Brooklyn Museum.

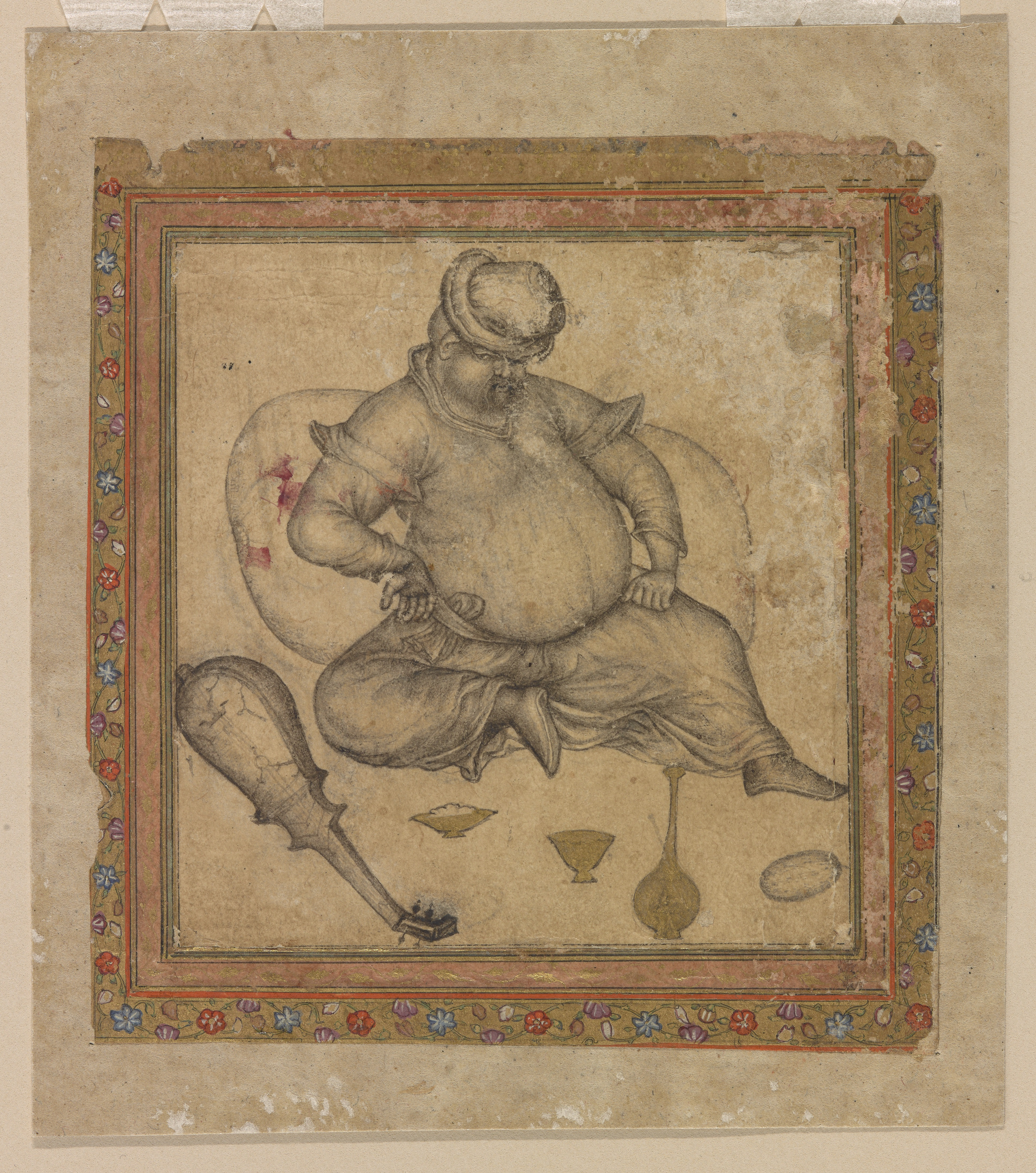
Seated Man by Basawan, c. 1580. Freer Gallery of Art.

== Materials, technique, subject matter, organization ==
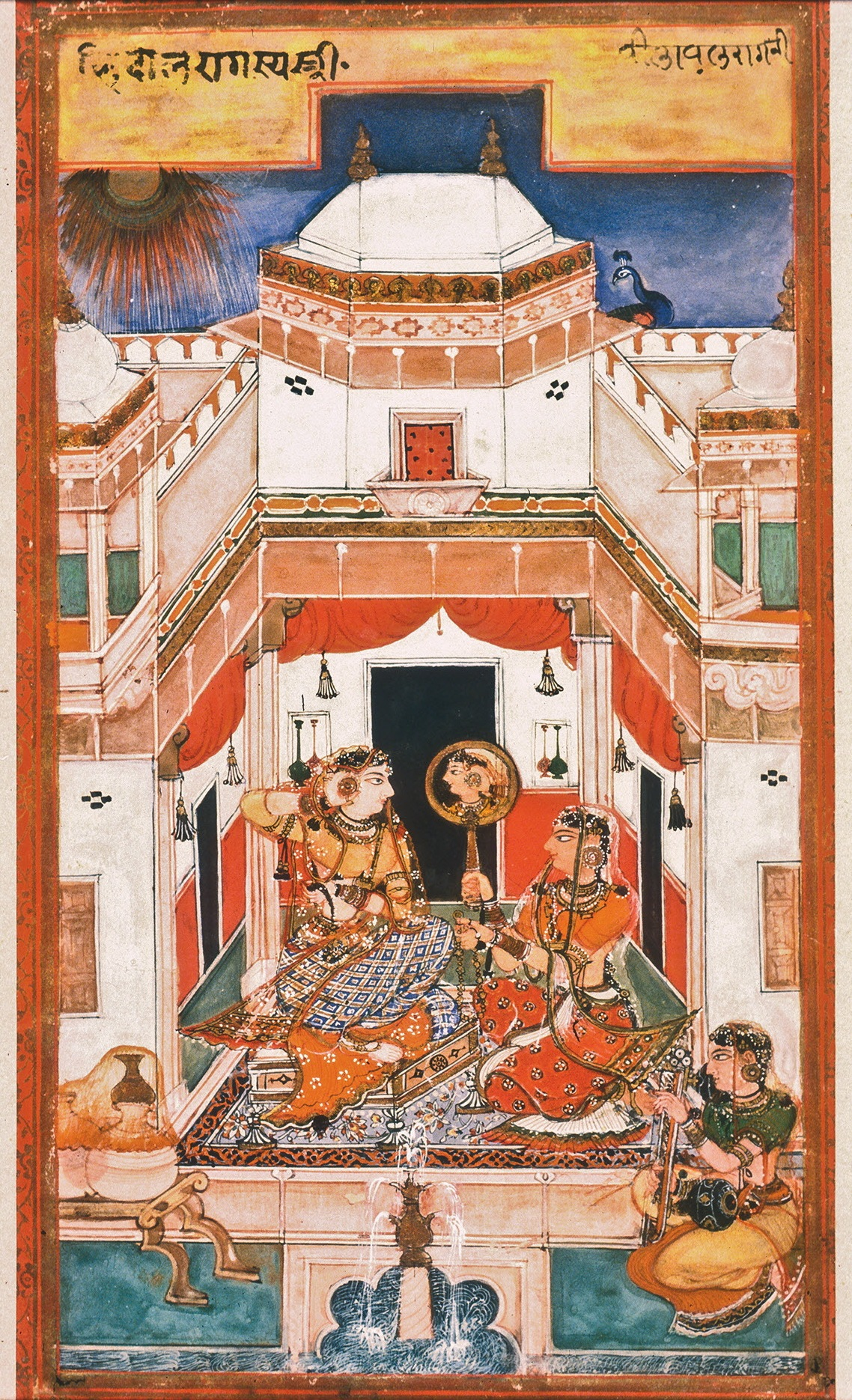
Vilaval Ragini, folio from the Chunar Ragamala, dated February 24, 1591. Bharat Kala Bhavan.

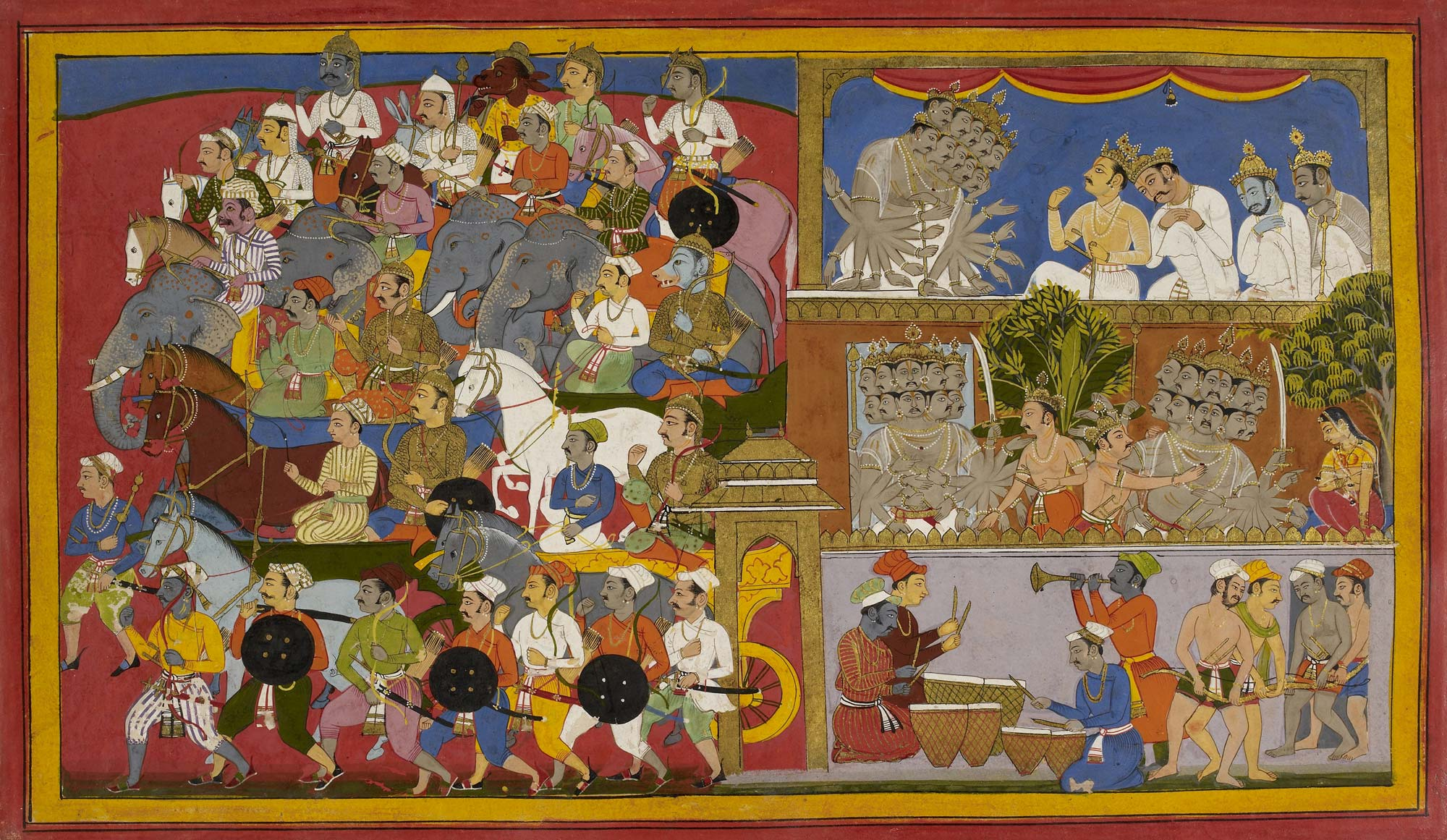
Ravana, overwhelmed by grief on hearing of his son's death, sends out more forces against Rama by Sahibdin, Folio from the Mewar Ramayana. Arranged in old horizontal pothī format, a full-page picture on one side of folio and accompanying text on the reverse, this painting follow Indian tradition of illustration of several connected incidents from a story in the same picture in continuous narration. Here we first see Ravana overwhelmed by grief on hearing of his last remaining son's death. Then furious with rage, he rushes with his upraised sword at Sita, who calmly awaits her fate seated in her grove, but he is restrained by his minister Suparsva. In order to intimidate Rama for his own going forth on the morrow, he decides to send out his army yet again to the accompaniment of war-drums and trumpets being beaten and blown, while his own bow is made ready. Mewar, 1652. British Library.

After some experimentation in the early 17th century, the Rajput manuscript format clarified into the large pothī, with paintings occupying the full size of the folio and text on the reverse and on intervening folios. In Rajput manuscripts, contrary to Mughal tradition, several connected incidents from a story quite often were illustrated in the same picture in continuous narration. Manuscripts of the 17th century have unillustrated folios separating the pictures. From the early 18th century they are more like picture books, because of the general continuation of the format of pre-Mughal manuscripts, with a full-page picture on one side of every folio and accompanying text on the reverse. The next stage of this development, found particularly in the court studios of the Punjab Hills from the mid-18th century, "is the reduction of the full Sanskrit text to a selection of verses or a summary in Hindi. In these late manuscripts may be seen the final development of the Indian conception of book illustration". For smaller texts Rajput studios used an upright pothī format, like the unbound leaves of a normal book, but often made of thick card. Texts such as Ragamala were illustrated one verse at a time, usually with a text panel at the top of the page and the painting underneath. Versos in this format are always blank and very rarely are such sets bound.

Nearly all Indian paintings, including Rajput, use technique described as gouache or opaque watercolor on paper. The first step is to draw a sketch with a charcoal stick with only the rudiments of a composition. The initial drawing is then firmed up in sanguine with a brush, with some details introduced, which is followed by a thin coat of priming in white. This priming was truly thin, for the 'underdrawing' has to show which, in the next step, is firmed up with a black line. Pigments are applied in stages, layer after layer, and after each coat was applied, the painting was placed face down on a flat surface and burnished, which fuses the pigments and imparts upon the painting a measure of the lustre. In next stage, khulai, (literally "opening up") "every outline turns crisp, every detail comes to life". To this moment rather bland painting start to bloom in all its aspects. Finally comes fine shading, sometimes gold applying, and "moti mahavar (pearl and henna) work, in which the minutest of detailing is painted in: impasto is applied on ornaments and jewellery, 'tooling' is done, lips and fingertips reddened".

Until the 18th century, painting for Rajput patrons was almost completely confined (with some exceptions) to the illustrations of traditional texts. Most popular subjects were Ragamalas and episodes from the life of Krishna (usually adapted from the Bhagavata Purana). The text of the Ragamala illustrates an element of Hinduism known as bhakti, devotionalism, a system whereby the worshipper exists in a direct relationship with a god. In both literary and visual presentations "this takes the form of romantic, often explicitly sexual, imagery: the worshipper (Lover) longs for union with the divine (the Beloved), and the obliteration of all sense of individuality". A second facet of the religious background to Rajput painting was Vaishnavism, which had become overwhelmingly influential by the 16th century. Krishna, the favorite incarnation of Vishnu, is a form of the god sent to earth to release men from the power of evil forces. Vaishnavism and devotionalism become so intertwined "that such non-Vaishnavite, bhakti texts as the Ragamala often show Krishna as the male figure" and in popular imagination he became the archetypal Beloved.

Among the sacred texts the most often illustrated was the tenth book of the Bhagavata Purana, with Ramayana only slightly less popular. Mahabharata was rarely illustrated. There are also many Rajput illustrations of medieval Hindi and Sanskrit literature, especially such rhetorical texts as the Rasikapriya of the poet Keshav Das, the Rasamanjari by Bhanudatta and the Satasai by Bihari. These works classified heroes (nayakas) and heroines (nayikas) (i.e. Ashta Nayika) and were so well known that series illustrating these subjects often had little or no text. Mughal influence means also that Rajput court artists were asked "to attempt portraits and records of historical events, instead of illustrating merely familiar texts extolling the gods".

Work in the Mughal workshops was highly organized, hierarchical and controlled. In Rajput world, there seems to be no "workshops" - in the sense of halls or buildings situated in the capital city, controlled by master (ustad) and attached to the court. There was extensive painting activity, large and cultivated states in which paintings in enormous numbers were made - one can take as examples Mewar in Rajasthan, or Kangra perhaps in the Pahari region - "but nearly everything there appears to have been made within families of painters: «family workshops», so to speak, not necessarily located in the state capital or nearby, and not made up of artists from different extractions or backgrounds". Artists could be working in their family homes, perhaps in a small town or village, being present at the court from time to time, especially when an occasion demanded it. Here too there were seniors and juniors, authority and obedience, masters, who were often heads of families, but the relationships were like those between members of family. Each family workshop, which could be large and extended, and include even some distant cousins, continuing to plow its own artistic furrow, preserving its own professional secrets, and walls of complete insularity were break down by intermarriage and other social interactions between artist families. Nevertheless, family conventions can survive "far longer than would have been possible within a Mughal-style workshop".

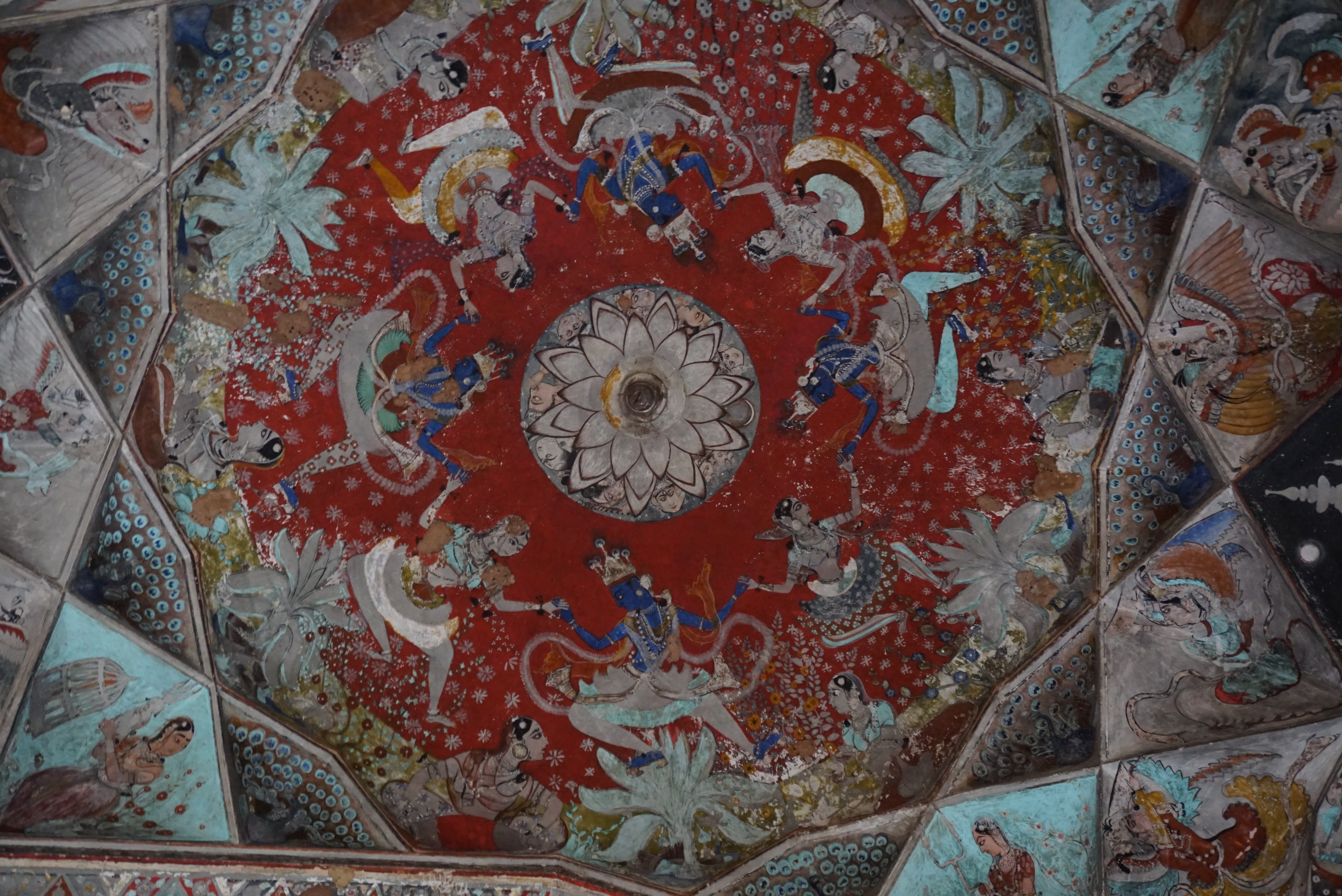
Rasamandala, c. 1620. Wall-painting in the Badal Mahal, palace of Rao Bhoj, Bundi Palace. Wall painting, although less important form of Rajput painting than manuscript painting, at the beginning of the 17th century was still practised at many Rajput courts. The most exquisite wall paintings of this period survive in the new palace of Rao Bhoj Singh (r. 1585–1607). Ultimately wall painting survive only at a folk level (see for example Shekhawati painting).

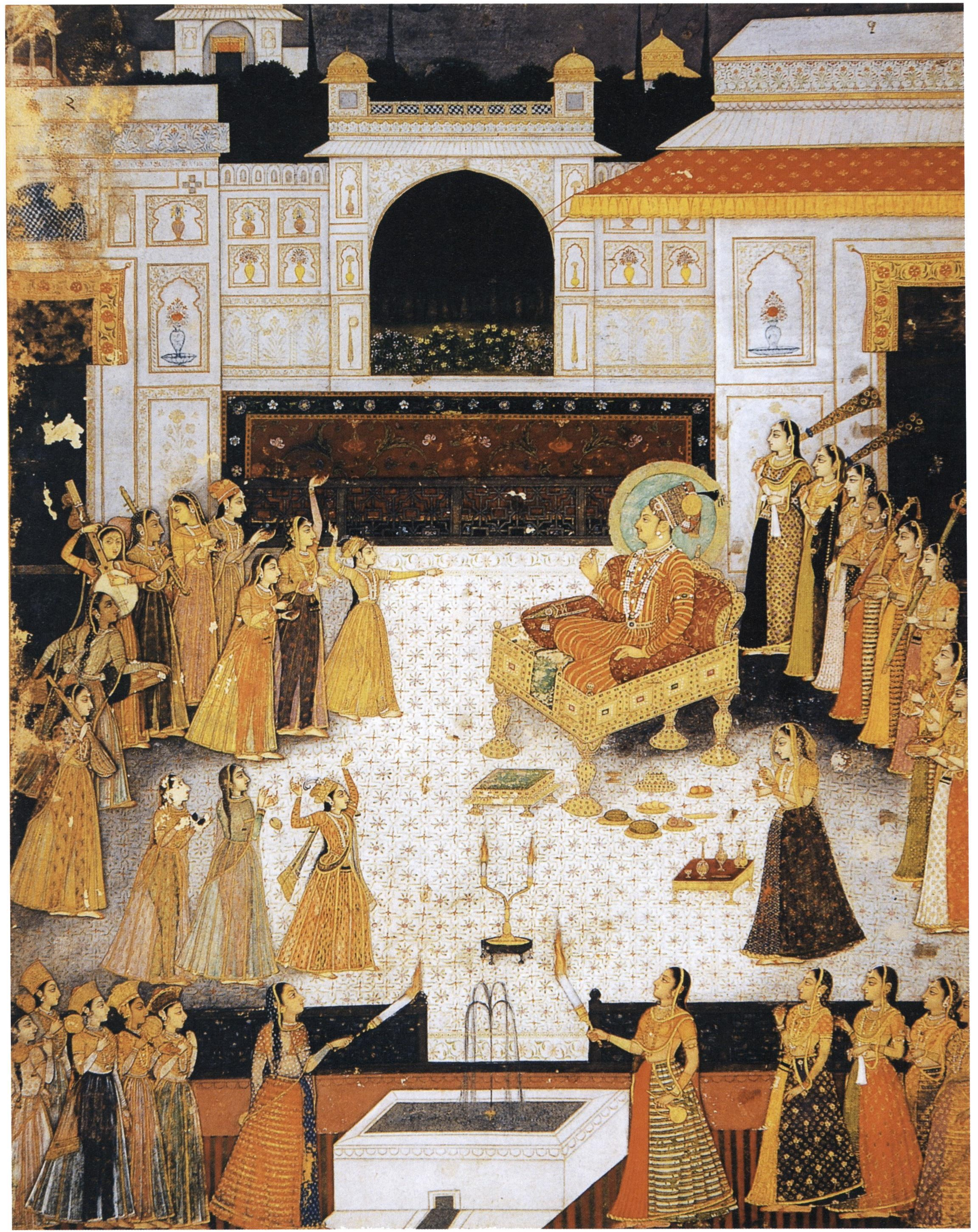
An Evening Performance for Maharaja Abhai Singh by Dalchand. Jodhpur, c. 1725. Mehrangarh Museum Trust.

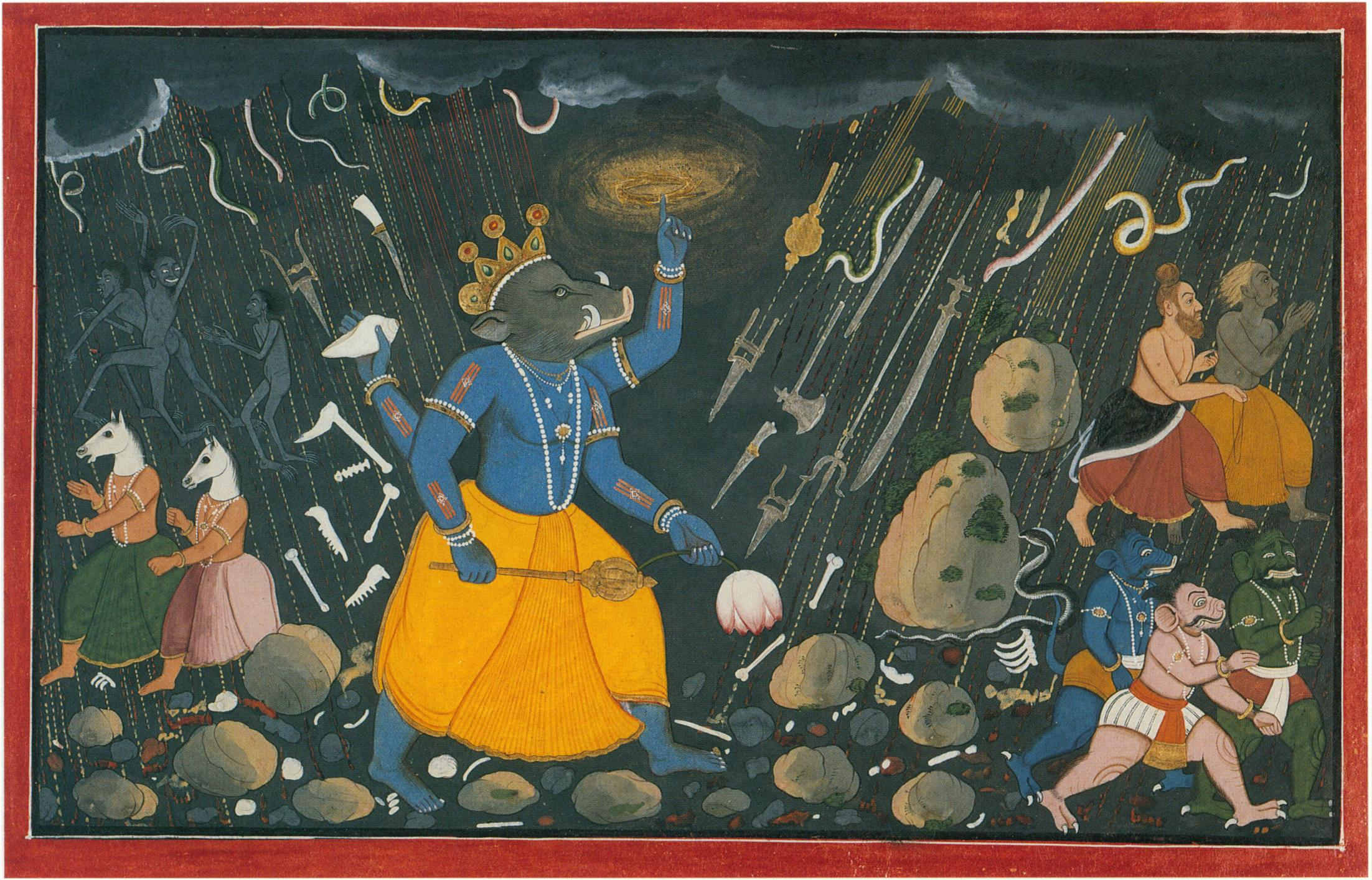
The Emergence of Varaha, the Boar-Incarnation of Vishnu by Manaku of Guler, Folio from a Bhagavata Purana series. On verso, inscribed with nine lines of Sanskrit verse from the Third Book of the Bhagavata Purana in devanagari characters. Guler, c. 1740. Government Museum and Art Gallery, Chandigarh.

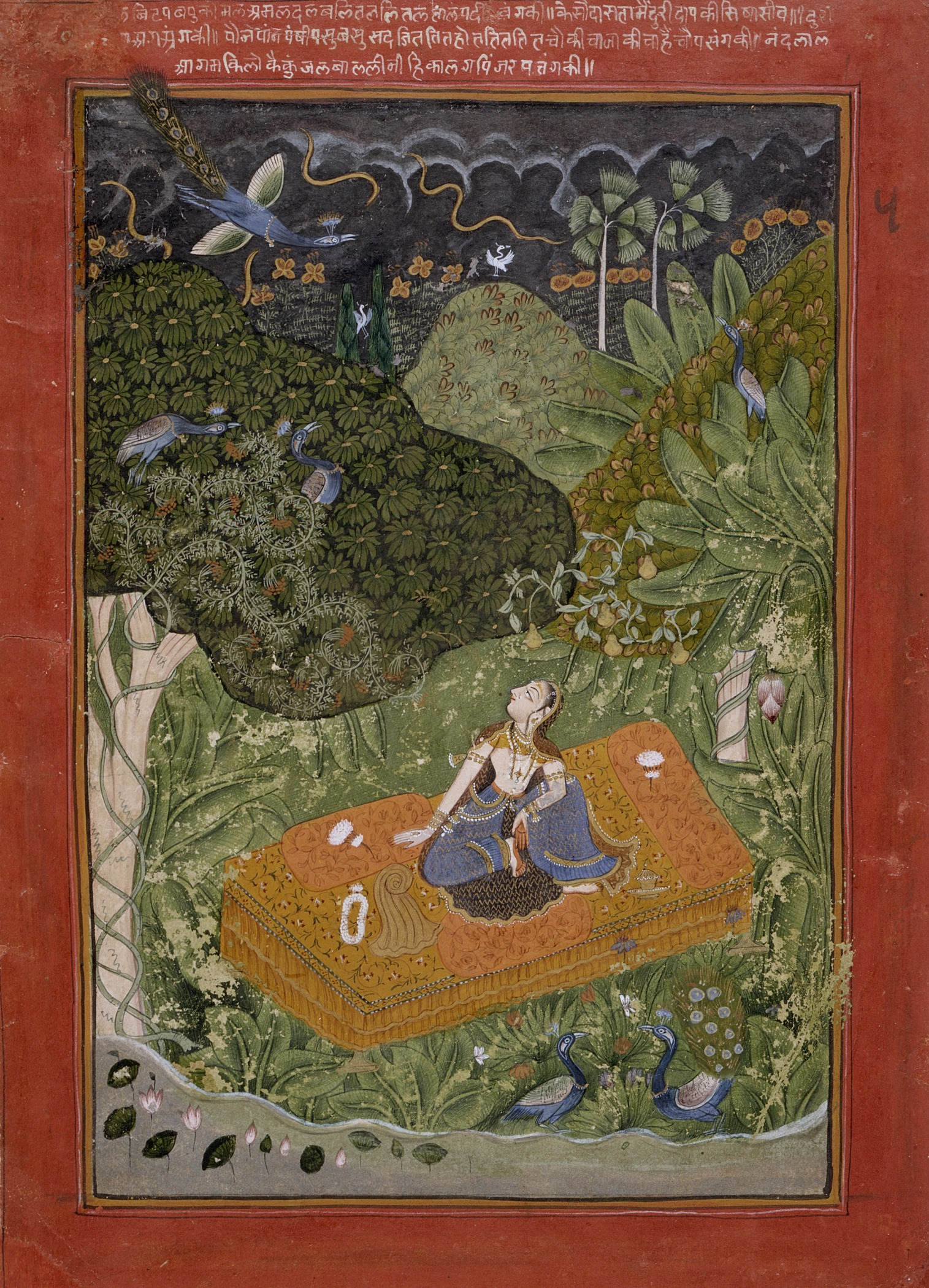
The Anxious or Expectant Heroine (Utka Nayika), Folio from a Rasikapriya (The Connoisseur's Delights) of Keshavdas. Uniara, c. 1760 or later. Los Angeles County Museum of Art.

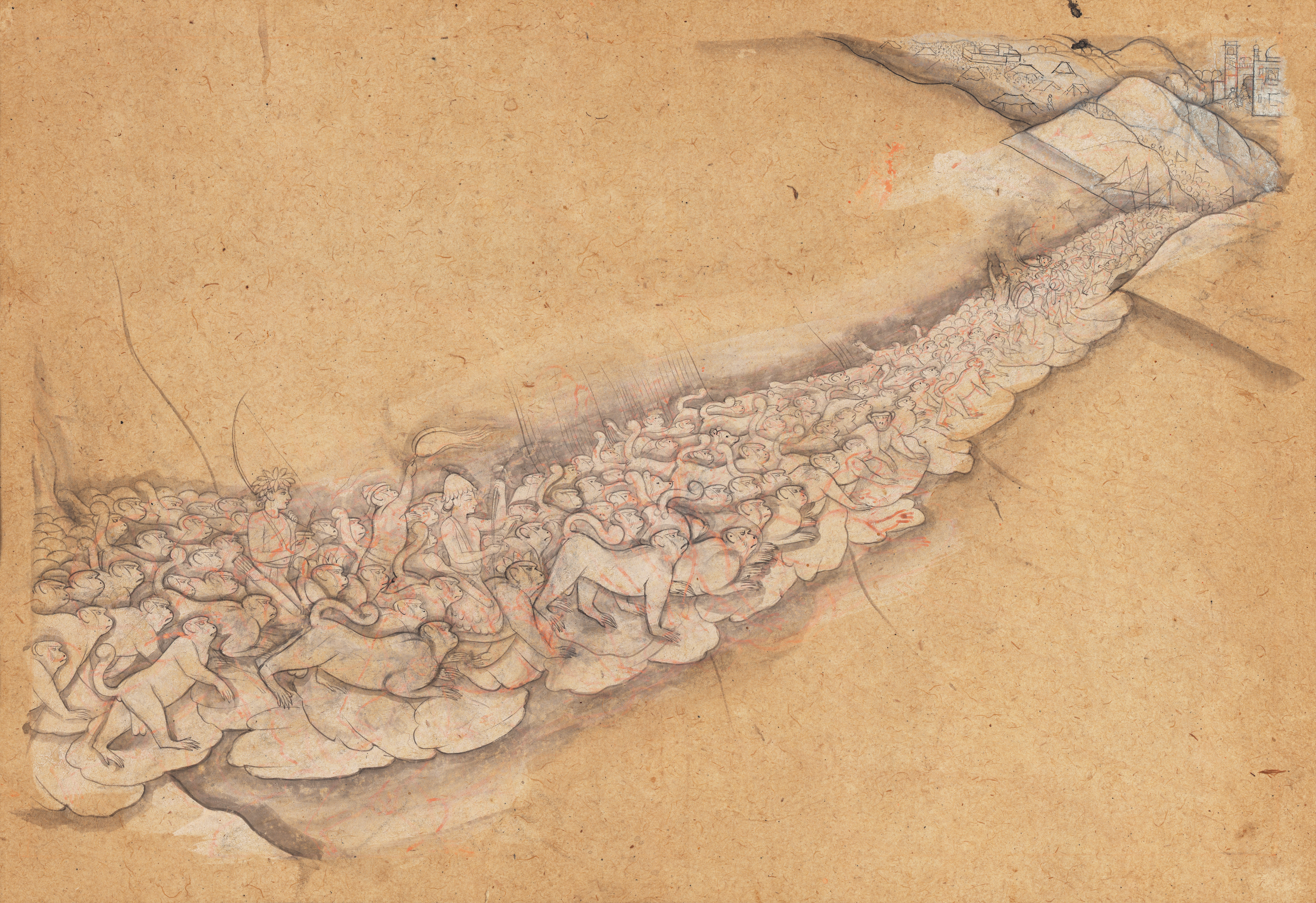
Setubandha – Rama and Lakshmana crossing the bridge to Lanka with the Monkey Army. Attributed to a Master of the First generation after Manaku and Nainsukh. Not every preparatory drawing becomes finished painting. Thousands of these drawings survive to this day and some of them are masterpieces in their own right. Here a master from the Seu-Nainsukh family workshop use an oblique perspective with strong diagonals and the suggestion of receding planes and diminishing figures meandering into the horizon, which impart a wonderful dynamism to the painting. Despite the dense crowding of figures, individual characters are expressed by the diverse gestures to animate them. The monkeys are depicted with remarkably intense expressions. The background is indicated through fluid undulating strokes indicating the hills with gentle slopes on the outskirts of the palace city at Lanka. Kangra, c. 1770. National Museum, New Delhi.

== The growth of local styles in the 17th century ==
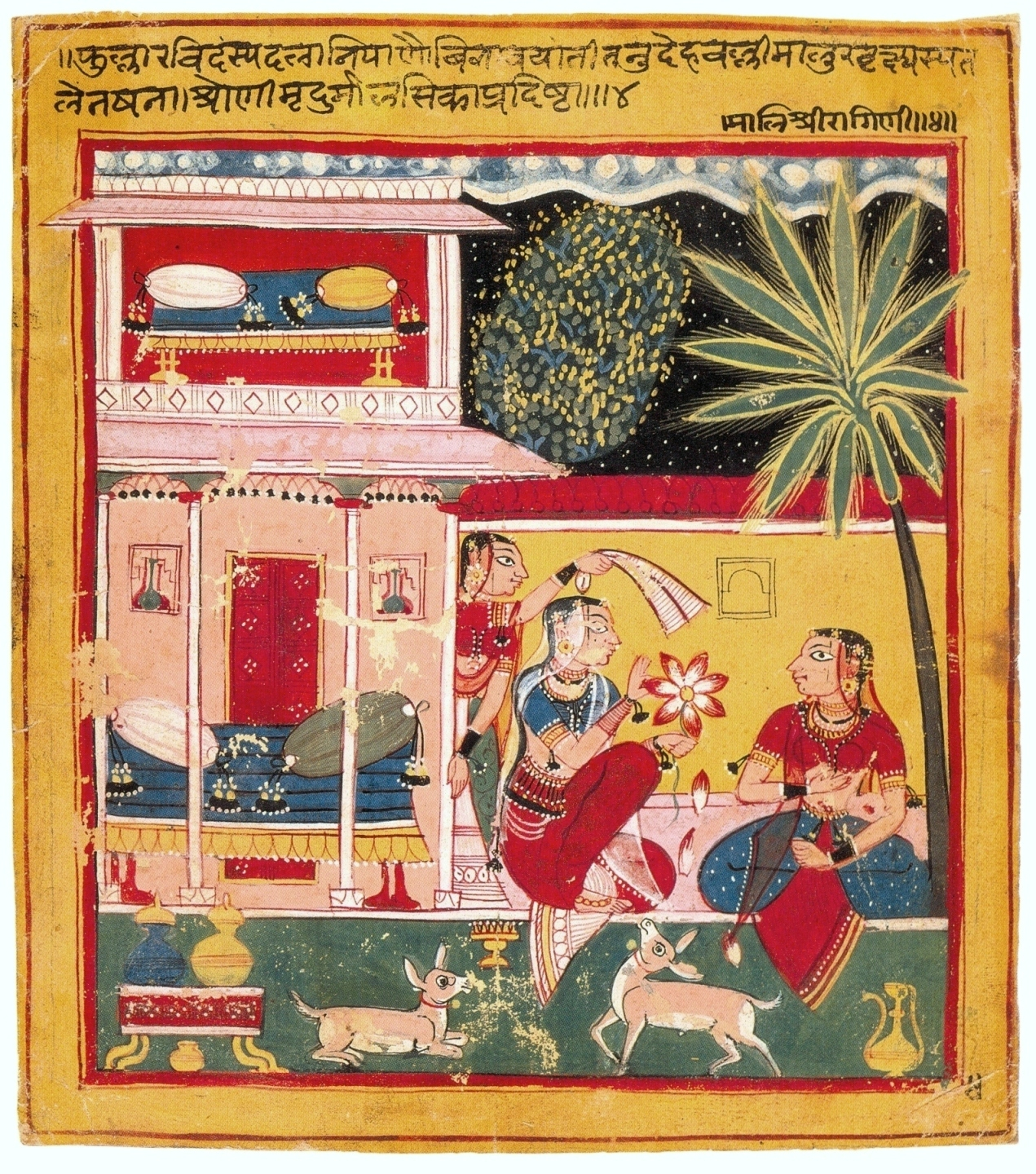
Malasri Ragini, Folio from the Chawand Ragamala by Nasiruddin. Mewar, 1605. Los Angeles County Museum of Art.

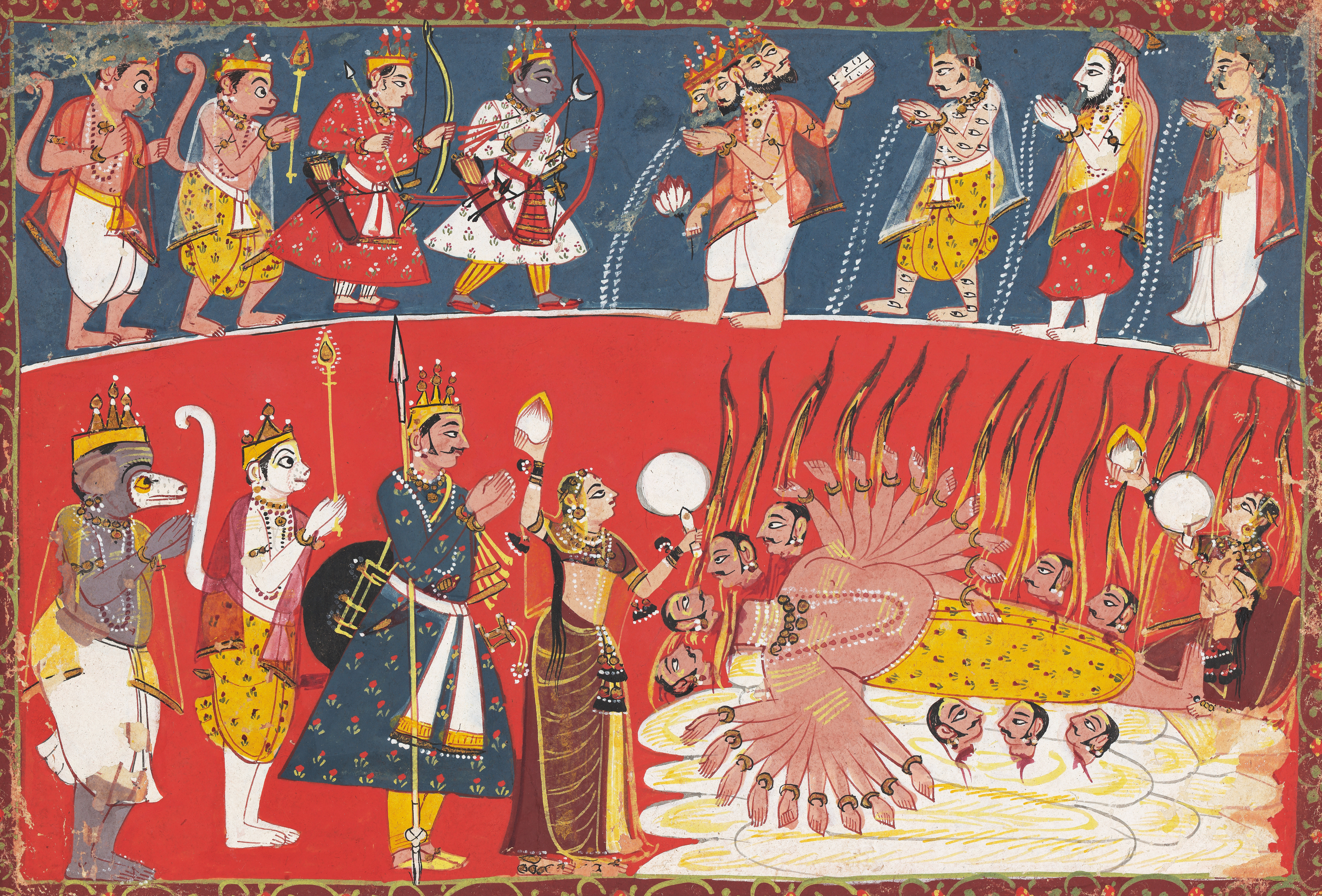
The death of Ravana, Folio from the Ramayana. The composition is divided into two horizontal compartments one of happiness and another of despair by a thin white curved horizon line, typical of the Malwa style. The upper panel in blue depicts gods and sages - Brahma, Shiva, Narada, Sanka celebrating Rama's victory facing Rama, Lakshmana, Hanuman, Angad crowned and adorned with their weapons. The lower register in vermilion (colour preferred by the Malwa artists) depicts Ravana's body on logs of sandal wood. Mandodari with Vibhishana, Sugriva and Jambavan pay last tribute to Ravana, when one of his wives is seated with him on his funeral pyre committing sati, which is not mentioned in Ramayana, but possibly reflects the prevalent custom of the time. Malwa, Mid-17th century. National Museum, New Delhi.

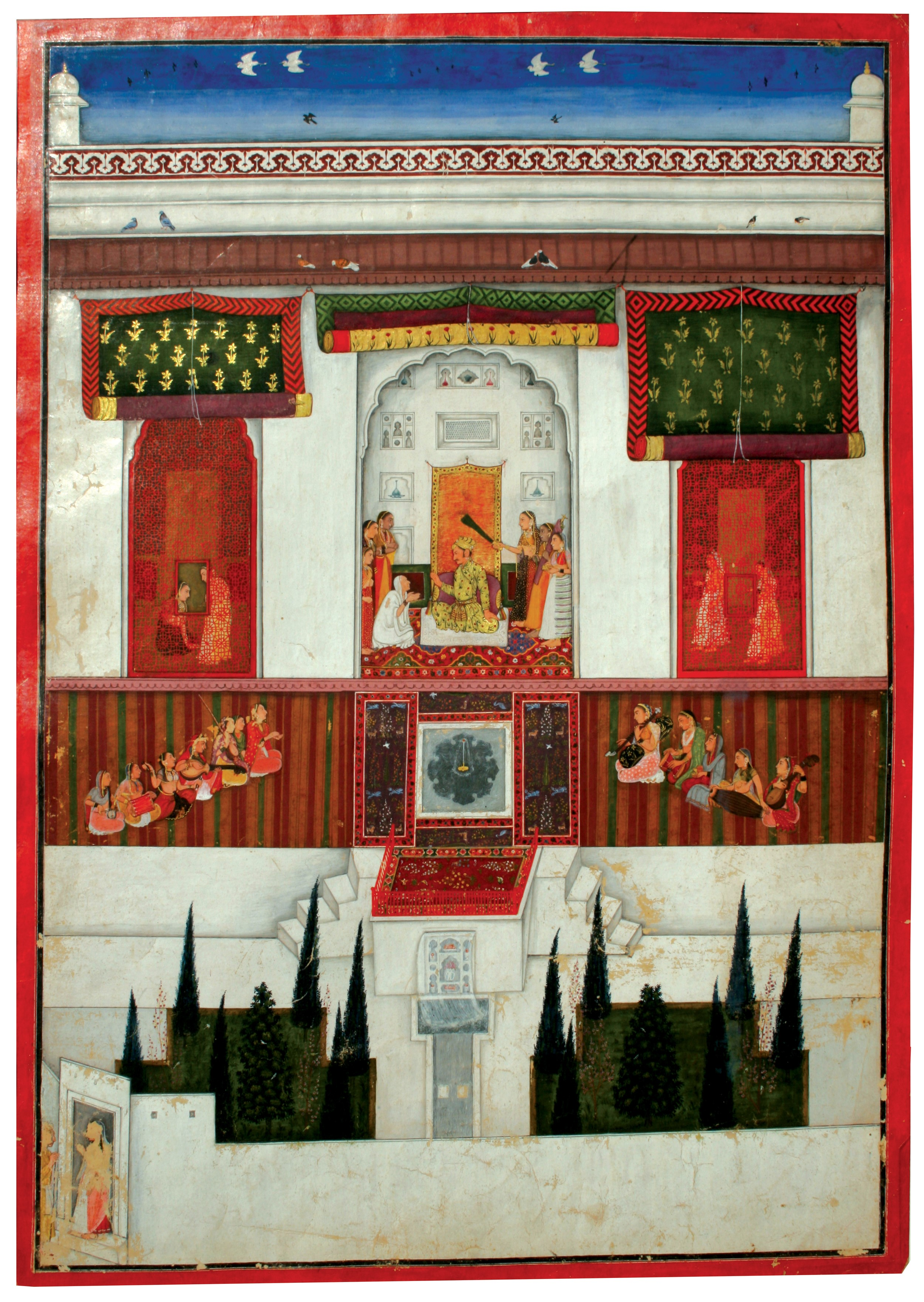
King Kamsa in His Inner Apartment, Folio from a Bhagavata Purana series. Mandi, c. 1650. Private collection.

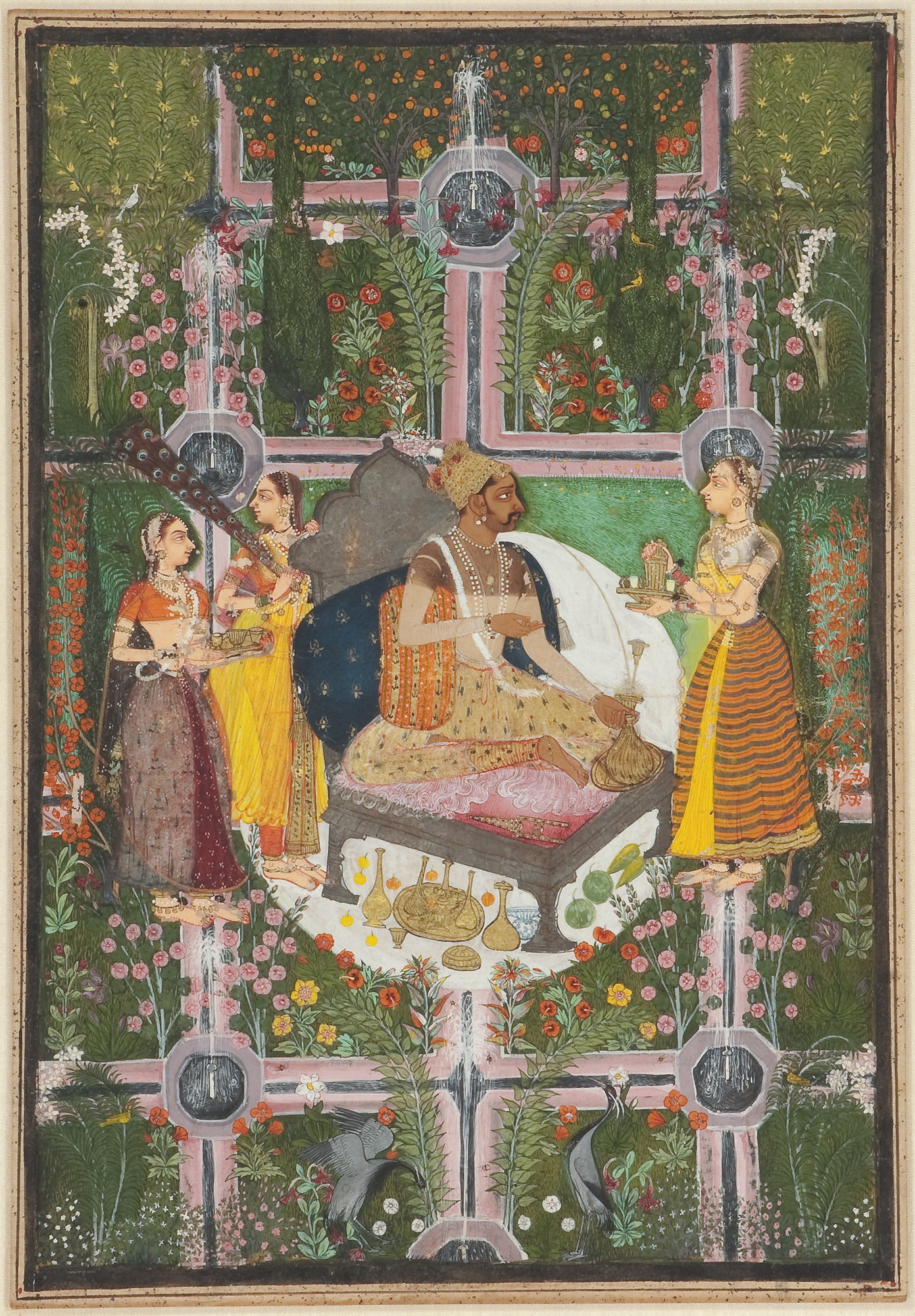
Maharao Jagat Singh of Kota in a Garden, attributed to Hada Master. With ruler centrally positioned on a platform in a geometrically laid out garden seen from bird's eye view, this work is based on a compositional type established under Jahangir. Rarely has a symmetrical garden seem more jungly, however, with yellow, orange and pink blossoms bursting out from a tangle of dark foliage, and there is no sense whatsover of the rigid garden pattern. Jagat Singh's expression is lively, and even the lines of his skirt swirl with abandon. Unlike contemporary meticolously planned and executed imperial Mughal portraits this work "seems to be painted in a series of spontaneous gestures". Kota, c. 1660. Private collection.

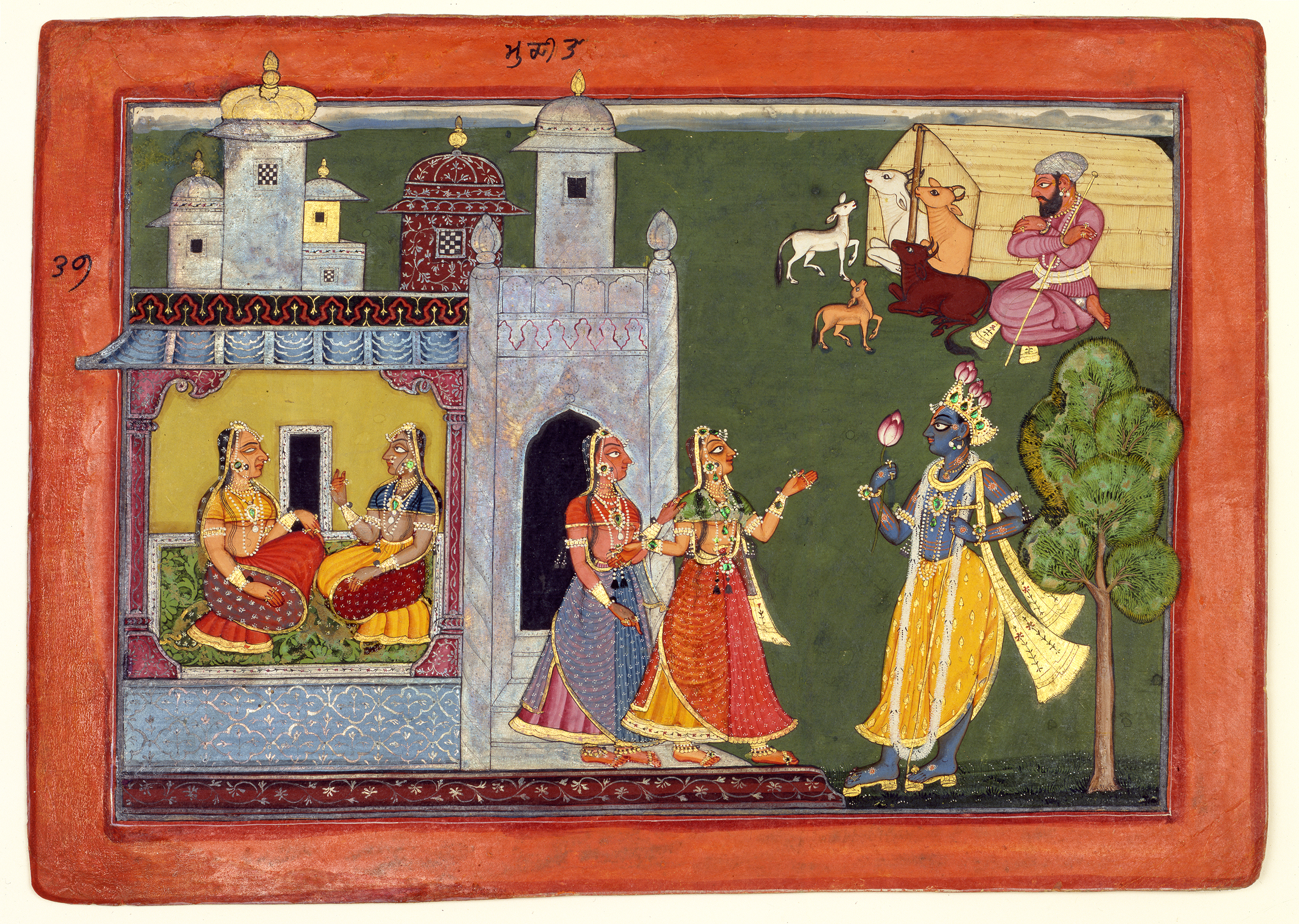
Delighted at the Prospect: the Nayika Mudita, Folio from a "Rasamanjari" series, attributed to Kripal of Nurpur. Nurpur, c. 1660–70. San Diego Museum of Art.

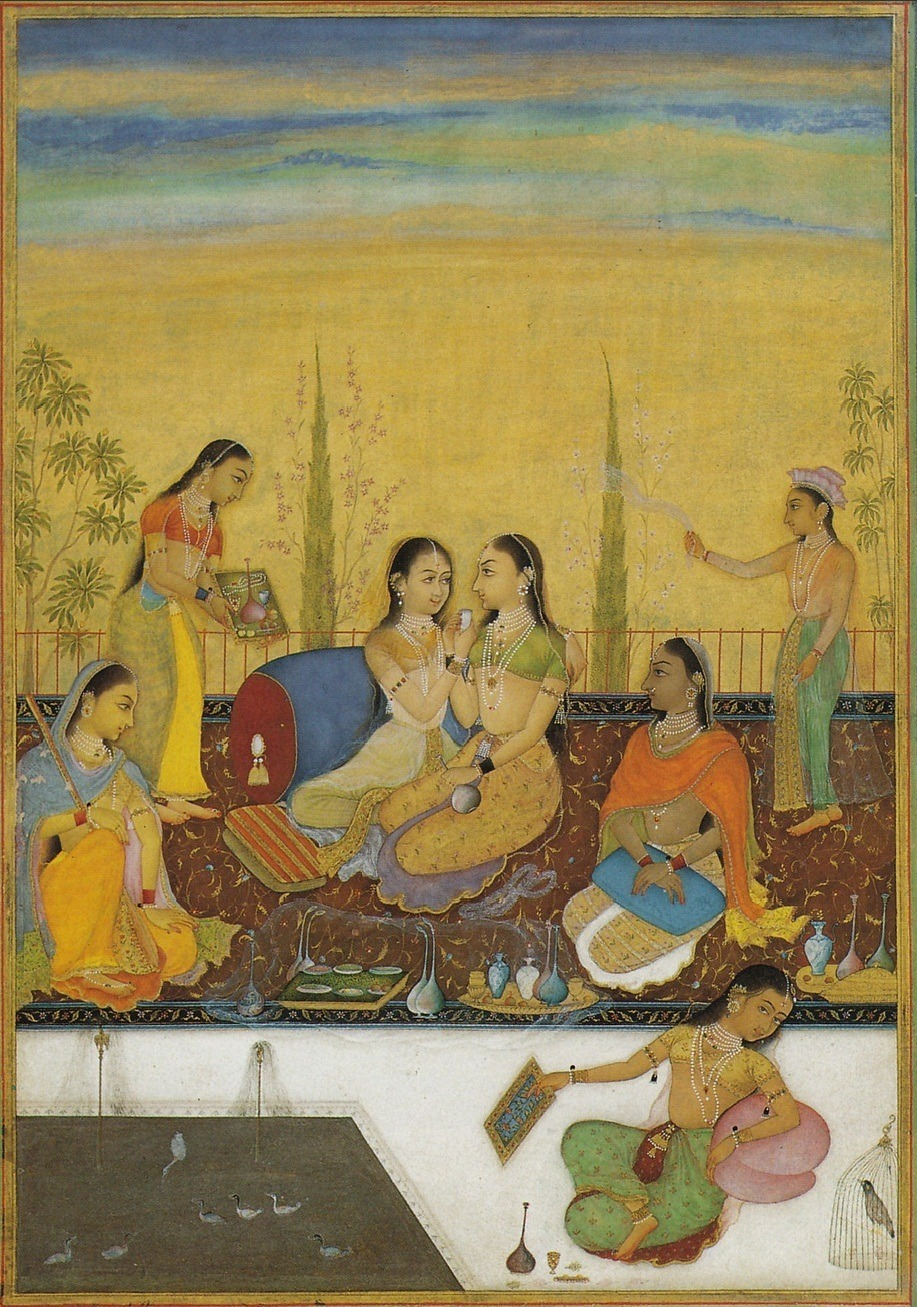
Ladies of the zenana on a roof terrace by Ruknuddin. Bikaner school is best known for its lyrical paintings in soft colours and with its "jewel-like color, refined drawing, extraordinary detail, superb finish and poetic mood" this work of Ruknuddin is great example of the style. Bikaner, 1675. Kronos Collections.

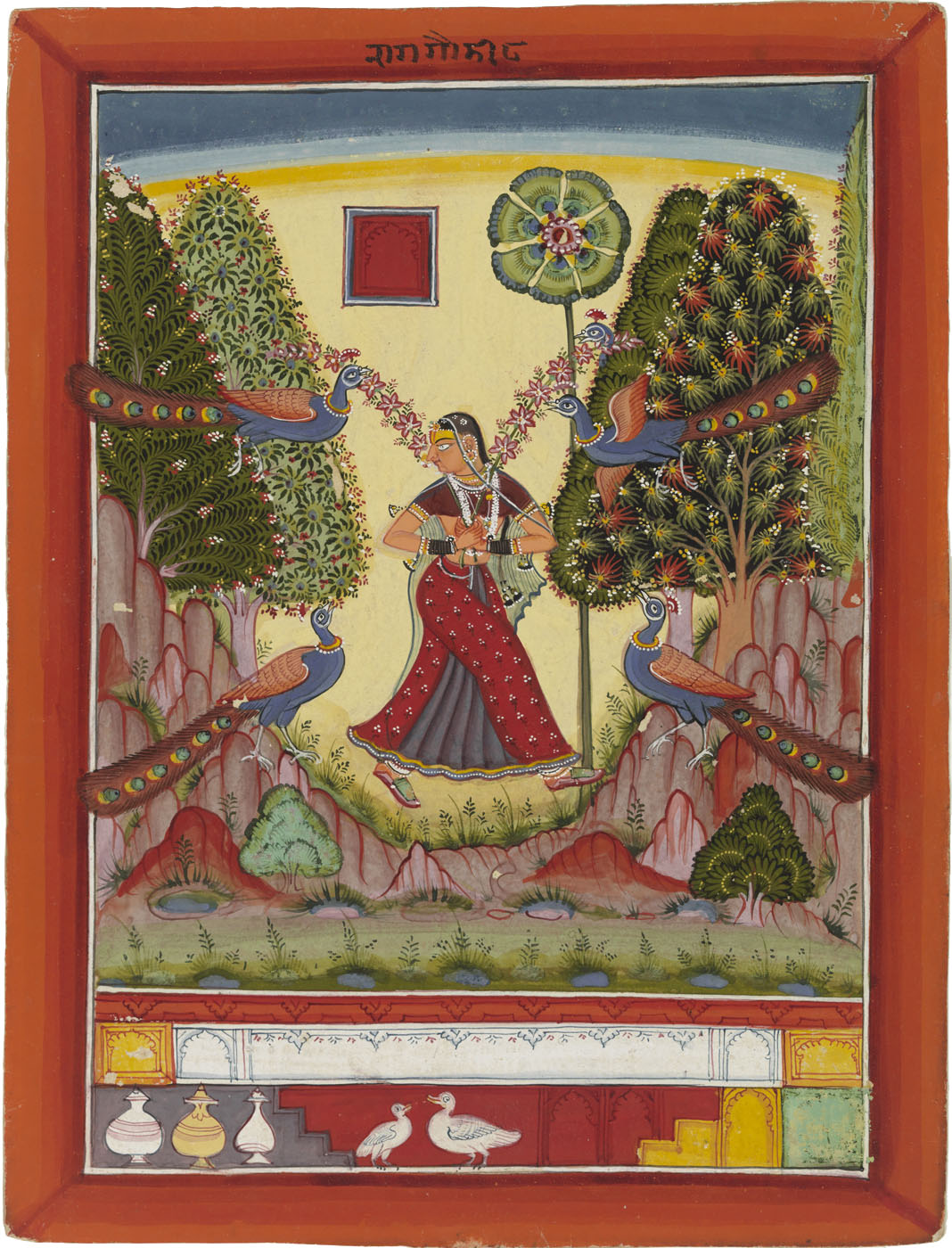
Gauri Ragini: A Girl with Peacocks, attributed to Sirohi Master. Probably Sirohi, c. 1690. Williams College Museum of Art.

=== Bundi and Kota ===
Rajput rulers and princes were frequently in residence at the Mughal court and hold important imperial posts. In this new founded Mughal-Rajput milieu they have direct contact with Mughal artistic taste and standards. Early evidence of those contacts is so-called Chunar Ragamala, dated 1591 (see illustration), which was probably painted for the member of the royal family of Bundi, and then became a model for painters from that state. Three artists of the Chunar Ragamala introduce themselves as trained in the imperial workshops by Mir Sayyid Ali and Abd al-Samad and whole set is painted in "a rough, but vigorous and inventive adaptation of Mughal style".

Bundi painting, with its refined line and controlled palette, is a good example of a fact that some styles of Rajasthan derive directly from Mughal painting (the same can be said about Bikaner and Kishangarh school). Other styles (e.g. Mewar and Malwa) "are the inheritors of the pre-Mughal Caurapañcāśikā group idiom and carry its essentially conservative values of flatness, abstraction, bold line and bright colour into the 17th century and beyond. [...] In spite of their apparent differences, the extremes of style in this area should not be considered as polar opposites but as ends of a stylistic continuum".

It is under the rule of Rao Ratan Singh (r. 1607 - 31) that the evolution of Bundi painting can be documented on the basis of datable miniatures and wall paintings. In 1624 Jahangir seized part of Bundi territory, presenting it to Rao Madho Singh (r. 1625 - 48), younger brother of the Ratan Singh. It was the beginning of the independent Kota State, but from the artistic point of view, painting of Bundi and Kota represent the same closely related idiom. Among the artists of Bundi state one great painter, called by today scholars Hada Master (fl c. 1610–60), established himself as a specialist in scenes involving elephants and hunting. At some time he moved to the new kingdom of Kota, when his works became the basis for its later painting. Attributed to him is also the earliest major portrait in what would become the distinctive Kota style, Maharao Jagat Singh of Kota in a Garden (see illustration). In Kota hunting scenes and studies of elephants (like illustrated here Ram Singh I of Kota Hunting Rhinoceros), remained popular into the 19th century. Painting at Bundi "developed instead an ongoing preference for Ragamalas and other literary and religious subjects, as well as more standard scenes of court life".

=== Bikaner ===
Bikaner submitted to Akbar in 1570 and daughters of the royal family were married to the emperor and Prince Salim (future Jahangir). This important and early presence at the Mughal court certainly affected artistic taste of the state's rulers. Bikaner painting has thorough contemporary documentation with inscriptions in Mughal fashion, and records indicate that some 500 artists worked at the court one time or another. The first documented patron is Maharaja Karan Singh (1631–69) and works from his reign draws heavily on contemporary Mughal and Marwar prototypes. Masters of the period included ‛Ali Raza 'of Delhi' (fl c. 1645–65), Natthu (fl c. 1650–95) and most famous of all Bikaner painters, Ruknuddin (fl c. 1650–1700). During the reign of Maharaja Anup Singh (r. 1669 - 98) Bikaner painting assumed a distinct character, "best described as a Rajput adaptation of Mughal refinement combined with an intense, Deccani-influenced palette".

=== Mewar ===
Kingdom of Mewar was the last state of the Rajputs which fall under Mughal rule. It wasn't until the 1615 that Mewar accepted Mughal suzerainty, and its long time resistance, motivated by orthodox Hinduism, becomes legendary. Artistic conservatism of Mewar art "was itself a reflection of the unchanging social and cultural values of this most traditionalist of Rajput courts". The first document of Mewar painting and one of the earliest dated Rajput works is so-called Chawand Ragamala of 1605. Painted by Nasiruddin this work shows strong stylistic affiliations with 16th-century manuscripts from Caurapañcāśikā group. Ragamala from 1628 by Sahibdin (fl 1628–55) show some influence of Sub-Imperial Mughal style, but his use of vibrant primary colours "reveals him as essentially a follower of the tradition of Nasiruddin, to whom he may have been related".

Sahibdin was the most important artist at the court of Jagat Singh I (r. 1628–1652), whose reign produced an enormous output of painting. Important manuscripts include Sūryava ṁśaprakāśa (‘Genealogy of the Solar dynasty’, i.e. the Sisodia Rajputs) of 1645, Bhagavata Purana of 1648 and the largest project, monumental Ramayana (see illustration of Ravana, overwhelmed by grief on hearing of his son's death, sends out more forces against Rama), with known volumes dated between 1649 and 1653. This last work show a retreat from earliest Mughal influence to even more traditional Indian style. Another artist who works on Ramayana with Sahibdin was Manohar (which shouldn't be confused with Mughal painter Manohar), known from harsher and less flexible idiom. Later manuscript painting at Mewar "seldom ventured beyond imitation or occasionally inspired elaboration of Sahibdin’s achievement".

=== Malwa ===
Malwa school of painting, because of its unpretentious appearance, had been designated 'Primitive Rajasthani'. In one of the earliest known examples of the style, Rasikipriya manuscript dated 1634, "backgrounds are plain blocks of colour; a patch of sky hangs at the top of the work, with a broad white band indicating the horizon line. Figures and a tree are often set against the monochrome ground; in rare instances a richer background is created with tall and decorative trees." Despite their 'primitive' appearance, the illustrations are indicative of a well-established tradition. Future stylistic evolution of this idiom is displayed in Ramayana manuscript of c. 1640 and Ragamala of c. 1650. In manuscript of Amaru Shataka from 1652 emerge another strain of Malwa painting, which in its delicate faces, gentle movements and subdued colors show Mughal influence. These two strains of Malwa school influenced each other in the succeeding decades. Illustrations of the Rasabeli (c. 1670; N. Mus., New Delhi, MS. 51.63/1–25) painted by Sukhadeva in old Malwa style nevertheless show clear influence of a new idiom. The so-called "Narsyang Shahar Ragamala", dated 1680 (N. Mus., New Delhi) and painted by Madho Das, is one of the most important works in a new style, which at this stage achieved its apogeum. Malwa tradition declined in the 1690s but nevertheless left a mark on painting of the neighbouring regions.

=== Marwar ===
Marwar, with its huge and largely desert territory, covers much of western Rajasthan. The far west of the region, around Jaisalmer, is geographically remote, and painting there maintaining simple compositions and a distinctive angularity largely untouched by Mughal courtly styles. A good example of those qualities is the most important early landmark in Marwar painting, the so-called Pali Ragamala of 1623 (see illustration), painted by Pandit Virji. The paintings are in an archaic horizontal format and represent lively folk style strongly influenced by the tradition of Jain manuscript painting. Later 17th-century manuscripts, predominantly Ragamalas, show an eclectic style, still heavily influenced by Jaina painting, but also with some elements borrowed from Malwa and Mughal schools.

Marwar painting in more easterly centres, nearer to Delhi and situated on important trade routes, was open to greater Mughal influence, especially after the rulers of Marwar capitulated to Akbar in the late 16th century. Maharajas Gaj Singh (r. 1620–38) and Jaswant Singh (r. 1638–78) were both eminent figures at the court of Shah Jahan, and under their patronage for the first time appeared Mughal-style portraits and group scenes. Some paintings from the reign of Jaswant Singh are evidence of "the style and technique of almost imperial calibre", but already after 1660 there is visible retreat from the earlier enthusiasm for Mughal taste. Despite all similarities disinterest in any accentuation of human subjects or material textures separates Marwar court paintings from their Mughal prototypes.

=== Sirohi ===
Sirohi seems to have developed a highly recognizable style by about 1680, its exact territorial range is however difficult to ascertain, because the lack of documentation means constant problems in assigning provenance. Sirohi painting is represented by almost identical Ragamalas, which show even less interest in Mughal painting than Mewar, where the most comparable style was practised. One of the artists associated with this broad regional style extending from southern Marwar across Sirohi State into Gujarat is called by today scholars Sirohi Master (fl. c. 1670–1690), because he probably worked for some time at the court of Sirohi. Attributed to him Ragamalas show consistent use of strong and strongly contrasting colors and absence of Mughal innovations in the depiction of spatial depth, individualized portraiture, and subtleties of colour. The textiles show none of the Mughal concern for the physical texture of fabric; while a sense of bodily weight is created by emphasizing and thicknenig the contour lines of the body, "following ancient Indian principles seen most notably in the Buddhist frescoes at Ajanta and continued in later manuscripts on palm leaf. [...] This is painting that seems to have evolved from the pre- and non-Mughal styles of Hindu and Jain India".

=== Mandi ===
Pahari painting is a phenomenon a little later than its Rajasthani counterpart. First evidence of painting from the hill region is a manuscript of Devi Mahatmya (Him. State Mus.), almost certainly from the third quarter of the 16th century, which was painted in a style of the Caurapañcāśikā group. The earliest court paintings from the Pahari state, done in a cohesive style very close to that practiced at the Mughal court between 1590 and 1630, were produced at Mandi, "a populous Hill court geographically occupying a large area in the lower portion of what is now Himachal Pradesh state". Many of these paintings were perfected by hand of an artist called by Catherine Ann Glynn Early Master at the Court of Mandi (fl c. 1635–1660) or were made in his atelier. The Early Mandi Master, following Mughal influence, to traditional technique added subtle pastels and more naturalistic drawing to achieve more realistic figures and vegetation. The subject matter of Mandi painting was similar to those practised in Rajasthan - illustrations to sacred texts like Bhagavata Purana and Ramayana, Ragamalas and secular court subjects.

Personality of Raja Sidh Sen (r. 1684–1727), who was a man of enormous stature and a great warrior as well as a devotee of the Shiva, heavily influence later development of the Mandi school, which acquired a highly distinctive character, especially in its portraits. The most important artist of this period, called by today scholars simply Master at the Court of Mandi, in contrast to earlier phase of Mandi painting used rather rough technique, aiming not to recreate a realistic image, but to provide a sense of the portrayed's character (see illustration of Raja Sidh Sen of Mandi - An Informal Portrait). Painting of this time is "characterized by bold, sweeping lines. Important figures are given emphasis by strong modelling on faces and other parts of the body. Compositions are simple and colours progressively more controlled. Space is often divided in three horizontal registers: a narrow foreground, monochrome background [...] and a white and blue strip at the top for the sky. The palette consists of muted colours, light blue and chocolate brown".

=== Nurpur and Basohli style ===
Prior to the 1980s the beginning of Pahari painting was associated with two series of paintings, so-called "Early Rasamanjari" (see illustration of Delighted at the Prospect: the Nayika Mudita) and the "Tantric Devi" series, both datable to c. 1660 - 1670. According to Goswamy and Fischer, who attributed them to painter Kripal of Nurpur (fl c. 1660–1690), those illustrations are "two of the most brilliant series of paintings in the entire art of India" The composition is an assamblege of compartments, each backed by a flat plane of colour. Figures are angular, with large heads and enormous eyes. There is facial modelling, but not allied to effects of light and shade. All of this, together with strong colors, brings comparisons with Caurapañcāśikā style, but the technique is extremely precise and there is none of the roughness of the pre-Mughal Bhagavata Purana. This kind of refined simplicity is responsible for much of the impact of these extremely expressive and vivid paintings.

Paintings of Kripal are linked with the so-called Basohli style (term coined by Ajit Ghose in 1929), characterized by "rich, monochromatic backgrounds; a strong, bounding line; exaggerated but superbly controlled drawing of faces and forms; arbitrary but brilliant use of architectural and decorative design; and, for a period of time, the use of beetle wing-cases stuck on to paintings suggesting, through their dazzling effect of colour and lustre, emeralds in jewellery and clothing". Ananda Coomaraswamy (who designated these works as from Jammu) distinguish this early, more passionate, style from the later, more fluent and naturalistic Kangra style. More generally, Pahari styles, like those of Rajasthan, range from "conservative idioms that preserve traditional values of bright colour, flatness and abstract form (e.g. Basohli and Kulu) to those showing greater Mughal impact in their refinement and cool colour (e.g. Kangra and related styles)".

Both son and grandson of Kripal, Devidasa (fl c. 1680–1720) and Golu (fl c. 1710 - 1750), painted their own Rasamanjari series, but only Devidasa worked for the ruler of Basohli, namely Raja Kripal Pal (r. 1678–1695). Family of painters descended from Kripal of Nurpur and associated with the beginning of the Basohli style lived in Nurpur and no major family of artists based in Basohli has so far come to the notice of scholars. Indeed, much work grouped under the umbrella term Basohli seems to have been done elsewhere or by artists working only temporary for the ruling house of this state.

Lying close to the Punjab plains, Nurpur was less isolated than other Pahari states. The earliest known Nurpur painting, dated c. 1620 (many of which is portraiture), indicates a debt to Mughal works. At the same time a bolder style was adopted for Ragamalas and some religious painting. These two styles coalesced in the early 18th century in the Rasamanjari of Golu. Paintings from the mid-18th century are markedly different, showing the influence of Guler and Jammu. Political deterioration of Nurpur means that from the 3rd quarter of the 18th century no major work was done and distinct Nurpur style ceased to exist.

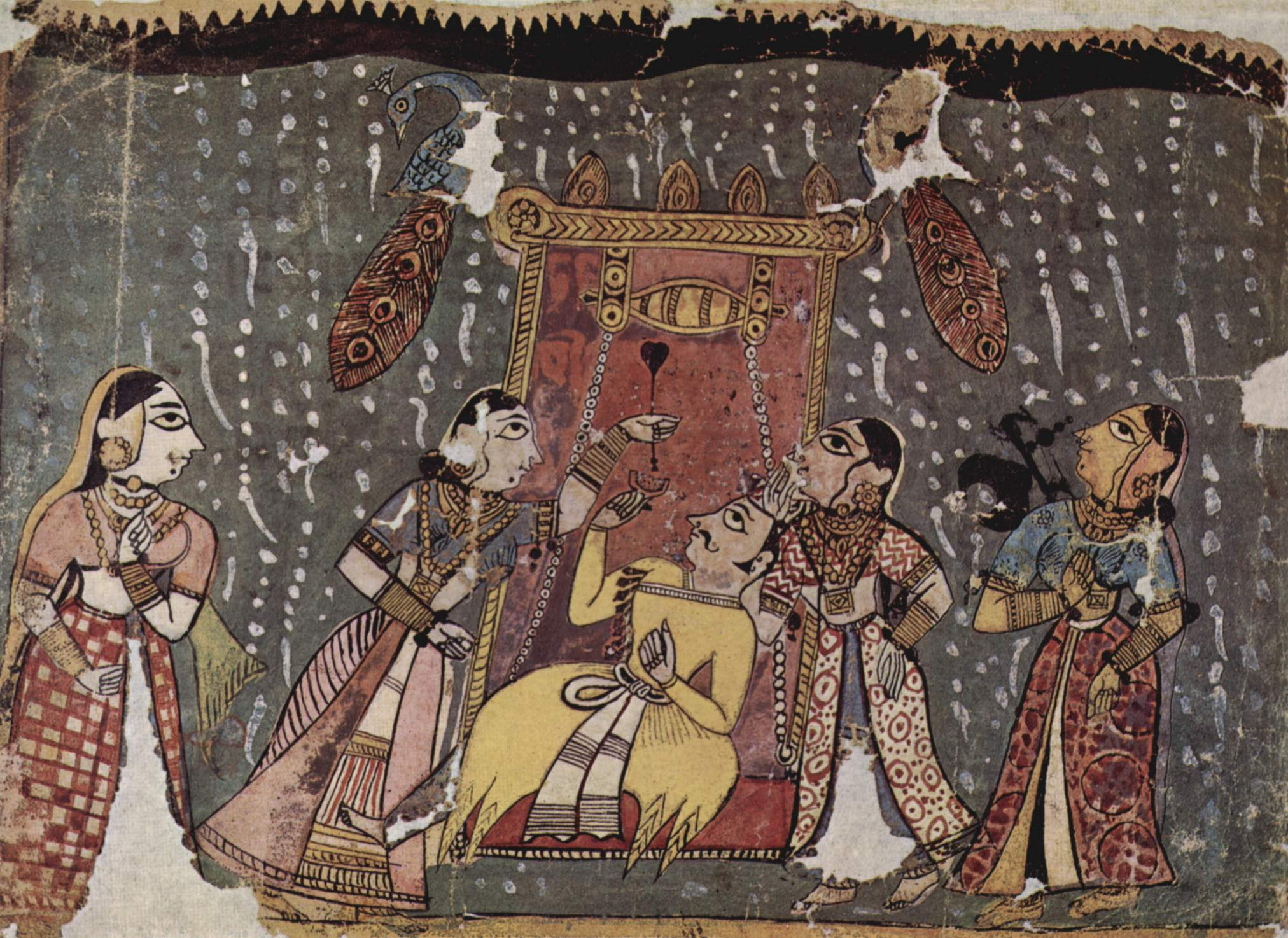
Hindola Raga, Folio from the Pali Ragamala by Pandit Virji. Pali, 1623. Sangram Singh collection.

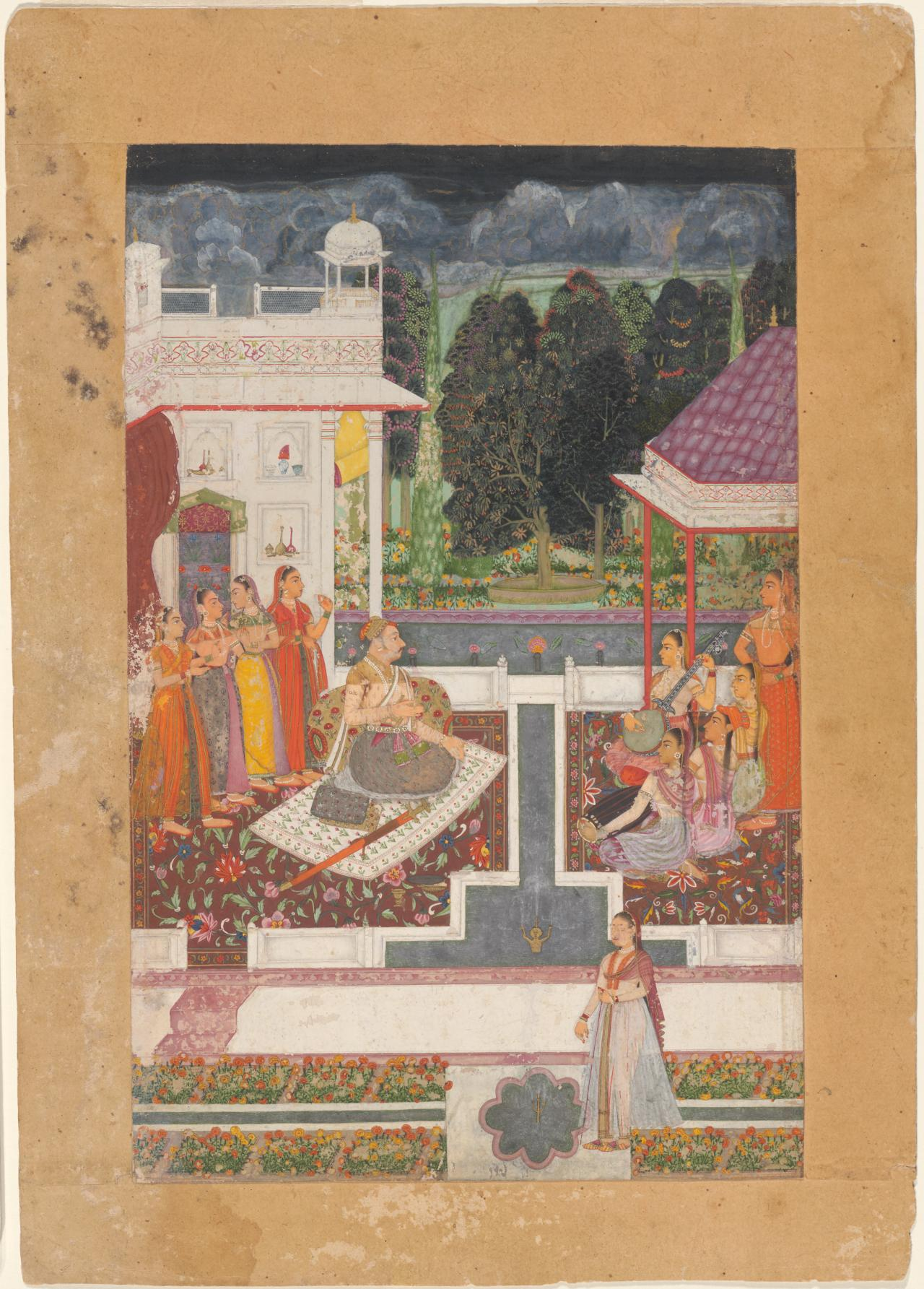
Maharaja Jaswant Singh of Jodhpur listening to music. This work, similarly to Mughal court art, seems to record a specific event in an identifiable setting. But unlike in imperial paintings the entire surface is so lively that we do not see people emphasized by a less important background, which is as intricate and detailed as the human figures. Nor are we aware of differentations of physical texture, and the clothing does not arose in us a sense of muslin or silk, but simply of strong shapes and colors. Marwar, c. 1660. National Gallery of Victoria.

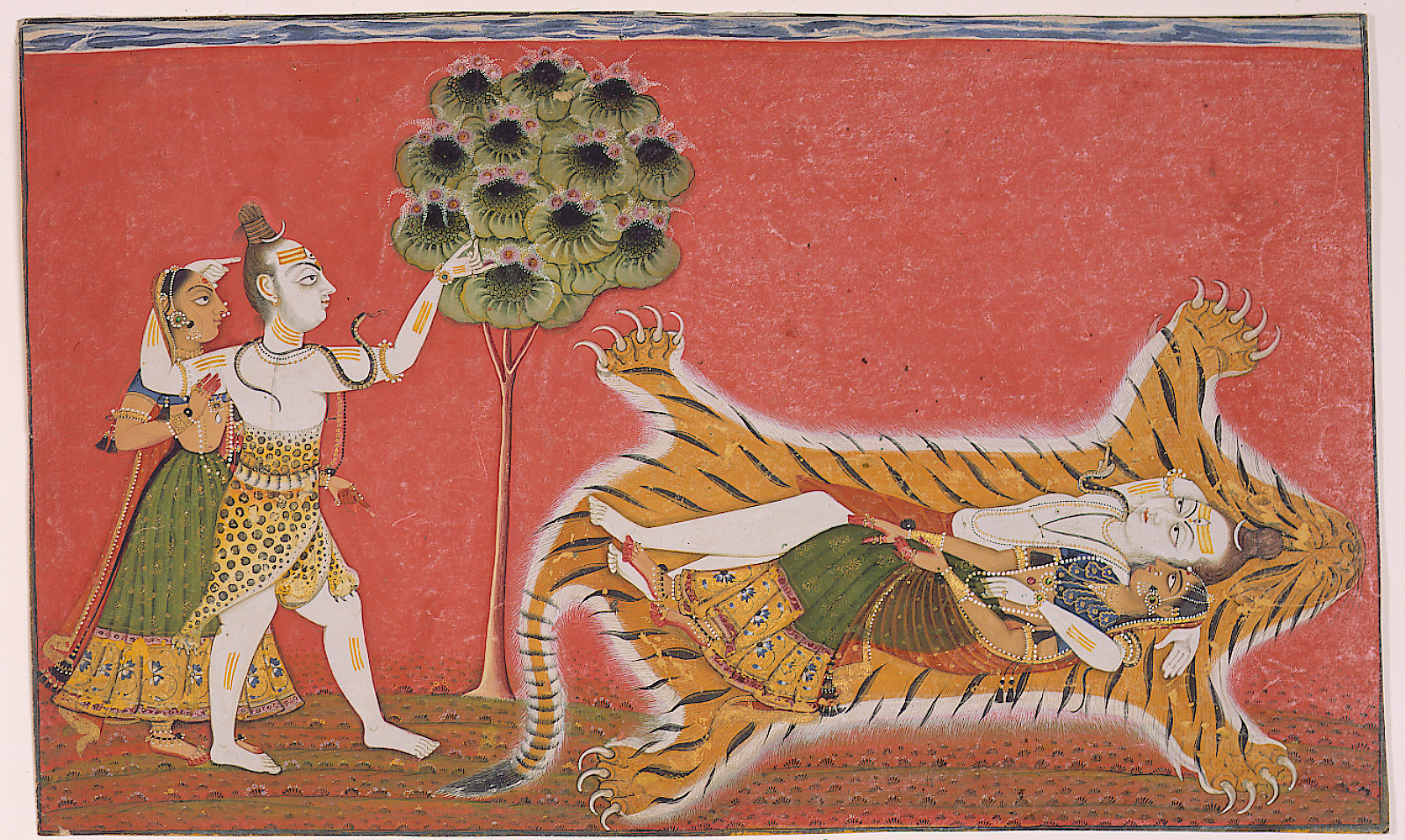
Shiva, Ever Solicitous of His Other Half by Devidasa of Nurpur, Folio from a Rasamanjari series. Basohli, 1694–1695. San Diego Museum of Art.

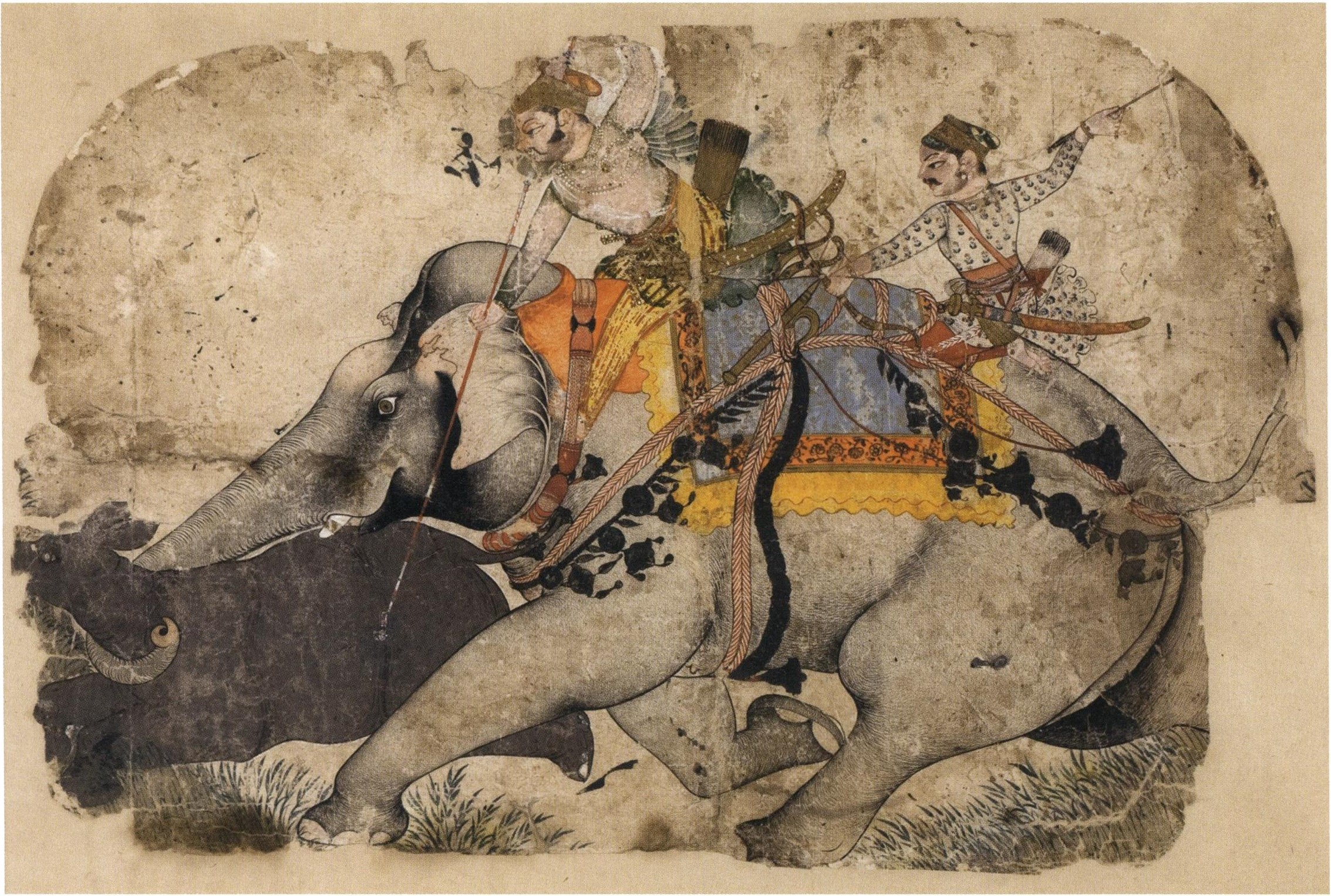
Ram Singh I of Kota Hunting Rhinoceros. Hunting scenes and elephant combats became a hallmark of Kota painting and in the overall effect of tense excitement, as well as in the detailed execution of animals, miniatures such as this one "exemplify the vivacity of design and technical skill achieved by the artists of Kota in the late 17th century". Kota, c. 1700. Private collection.

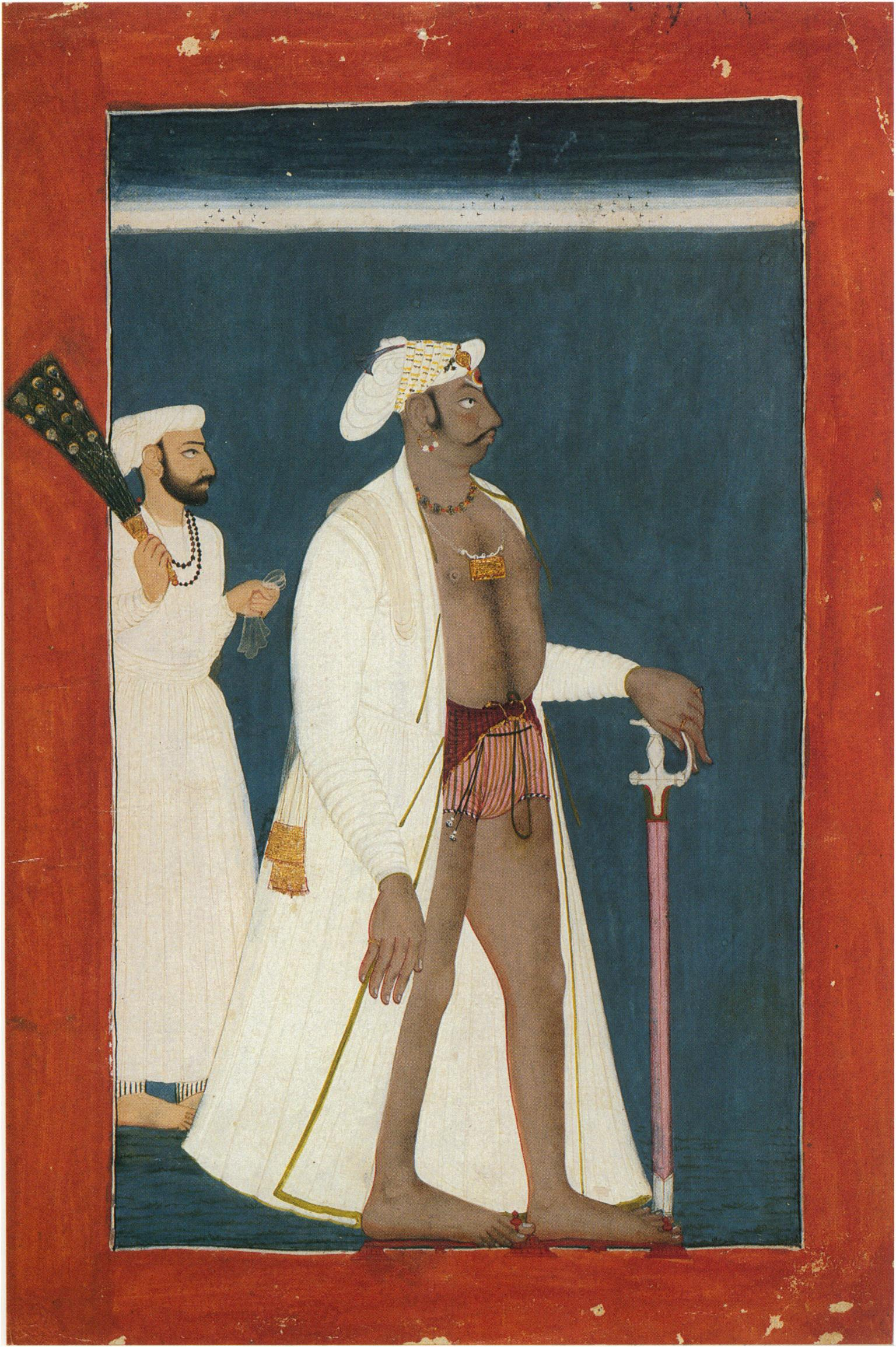
Raja Sidh Sen of Mandi - An Informal Portrait. Mandi workshop, attributed to Master at the Court of Mandi, c. 1700. Government Museum and Art Gallery, Chandigarh.

== Domination of Rajput painting in the 18th century and later developments ==
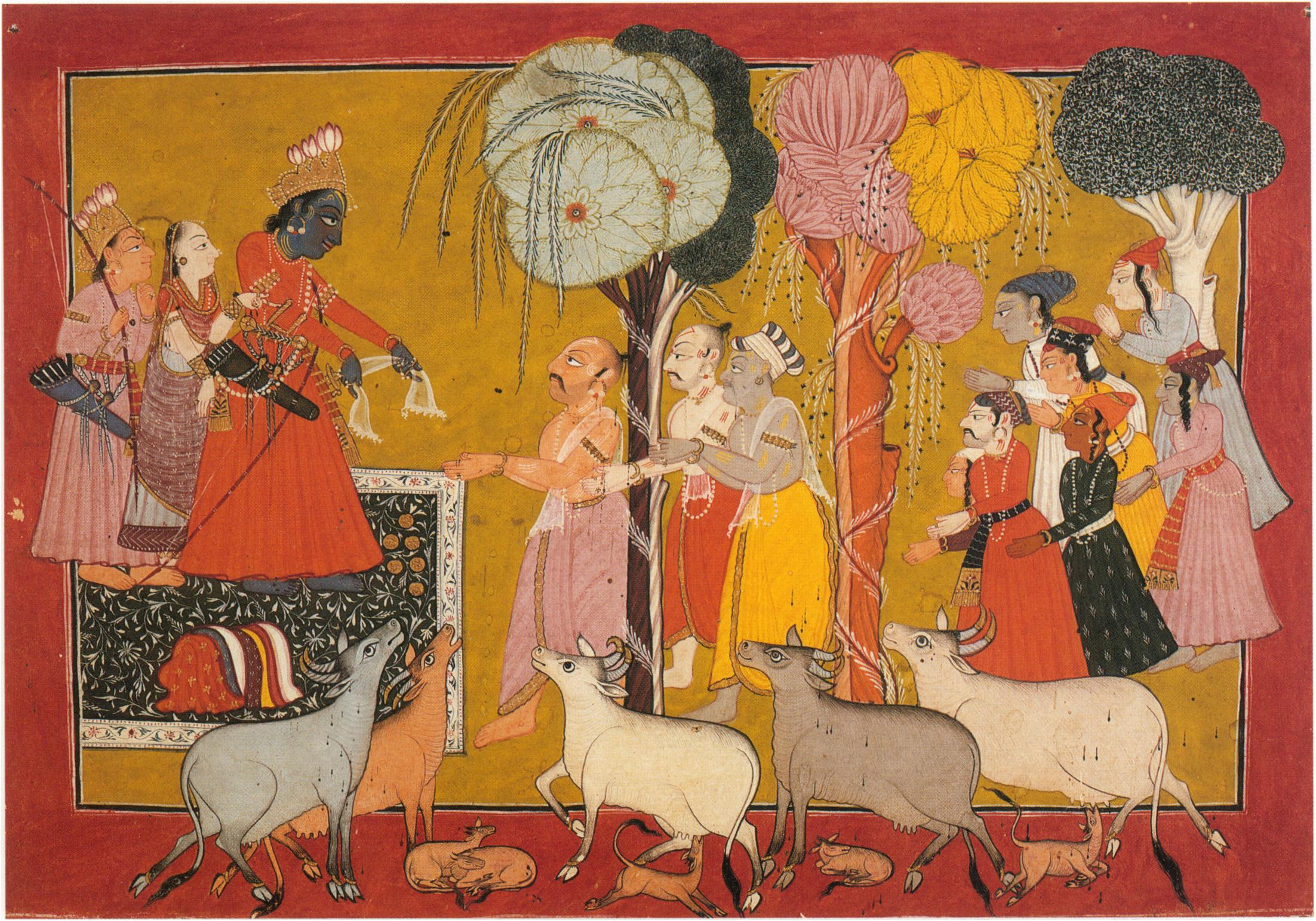
Rama Bestows His Possessions on the Brahmins, His Friends, and Servants, Folio from the "Shangri" Ramayana. Attributed to First Bahu Master, c. 1680–1695. Los Angeles County Museum of Art.

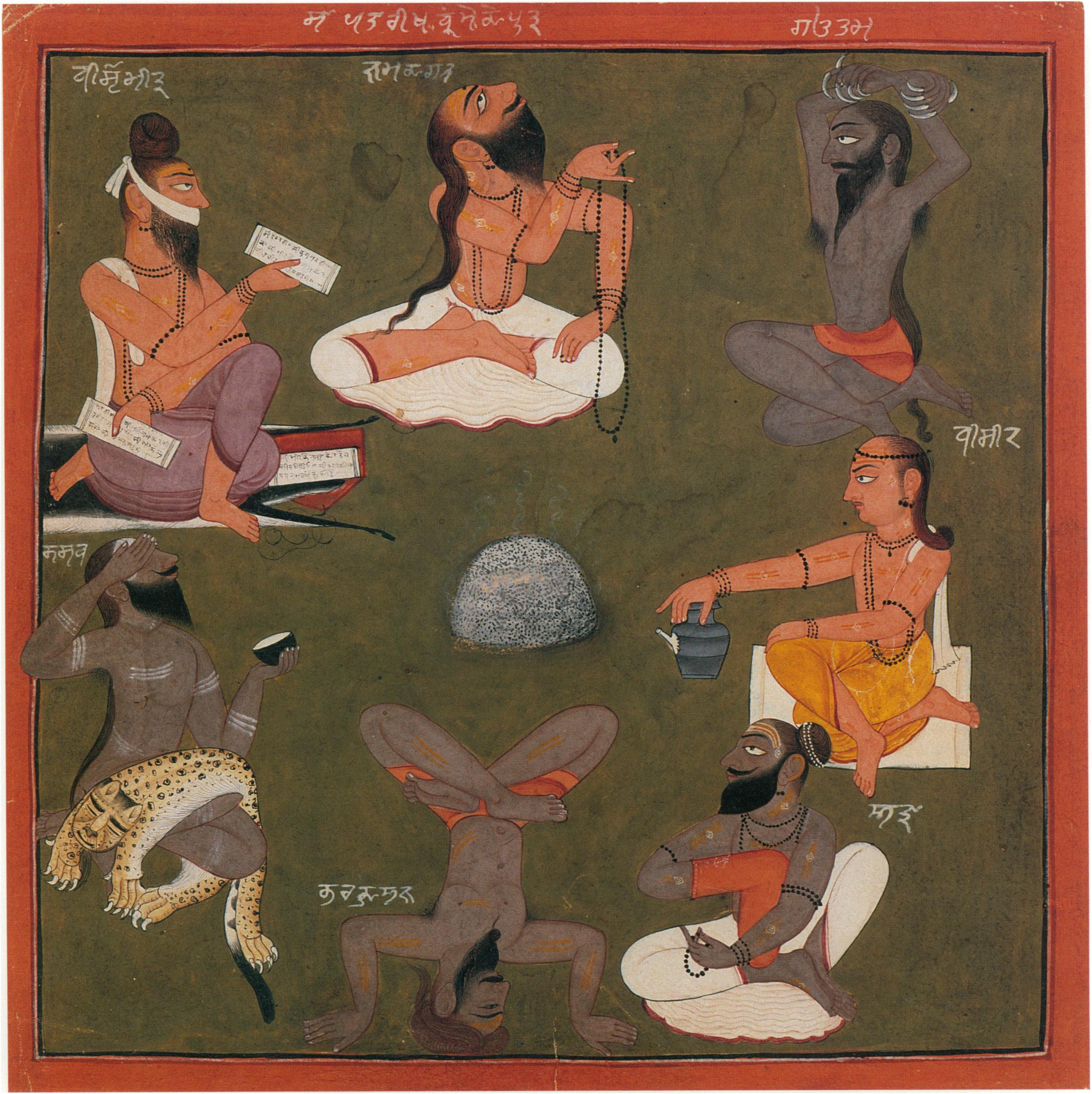
Saptarishi. The Seven Sages, attributed to Master at the Court of Mankot. Bandralta-Mankot workshop, c. 1700. Government Museum and Art Gallery, Chandigarh.

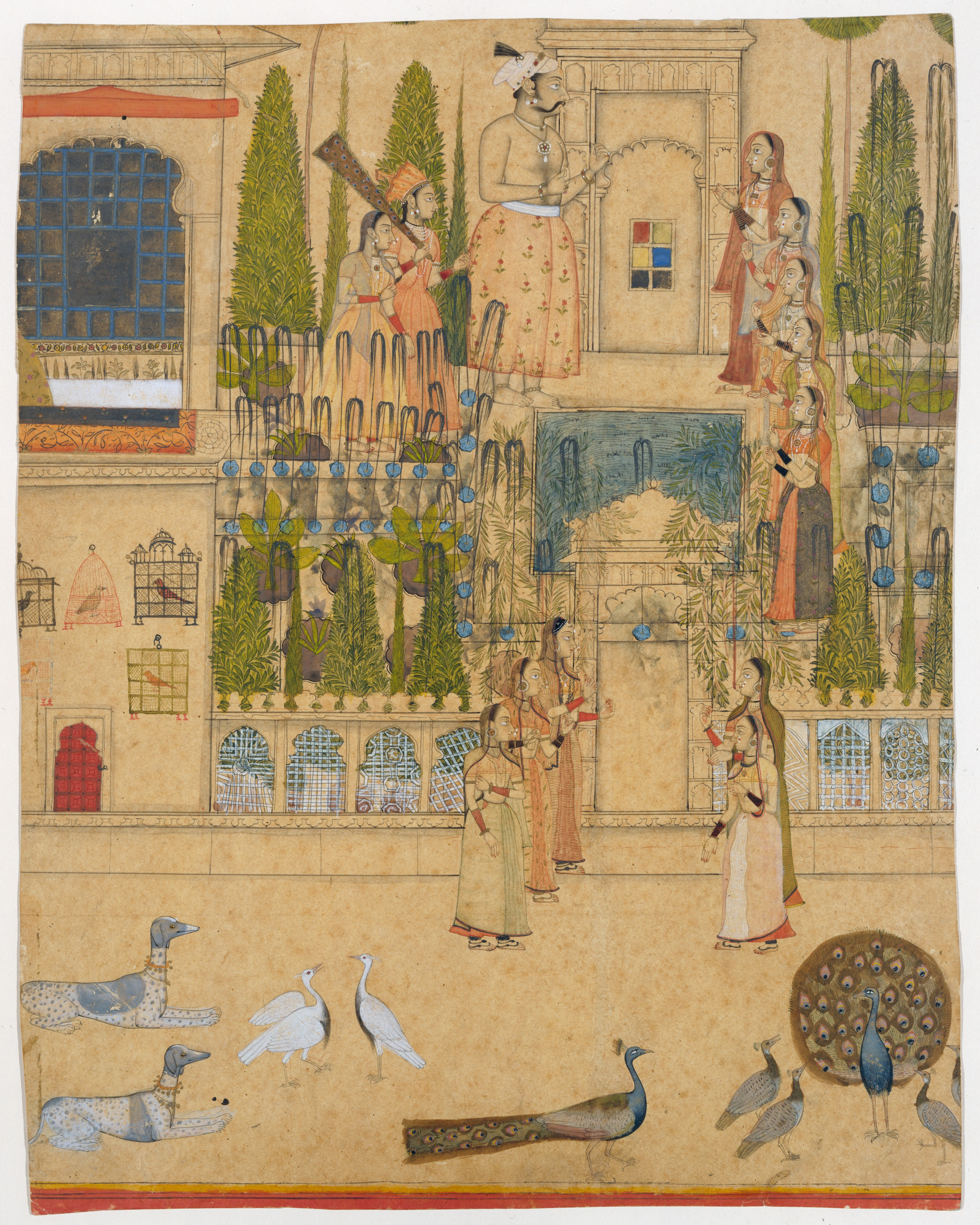
Maharana Amar Singh II with Ladies of the Zenana outside the Picture Hall at Rajnagar, attributed to Stipple Master. Udaipur, c. 1707–8. Metropolitan Museum of Art.

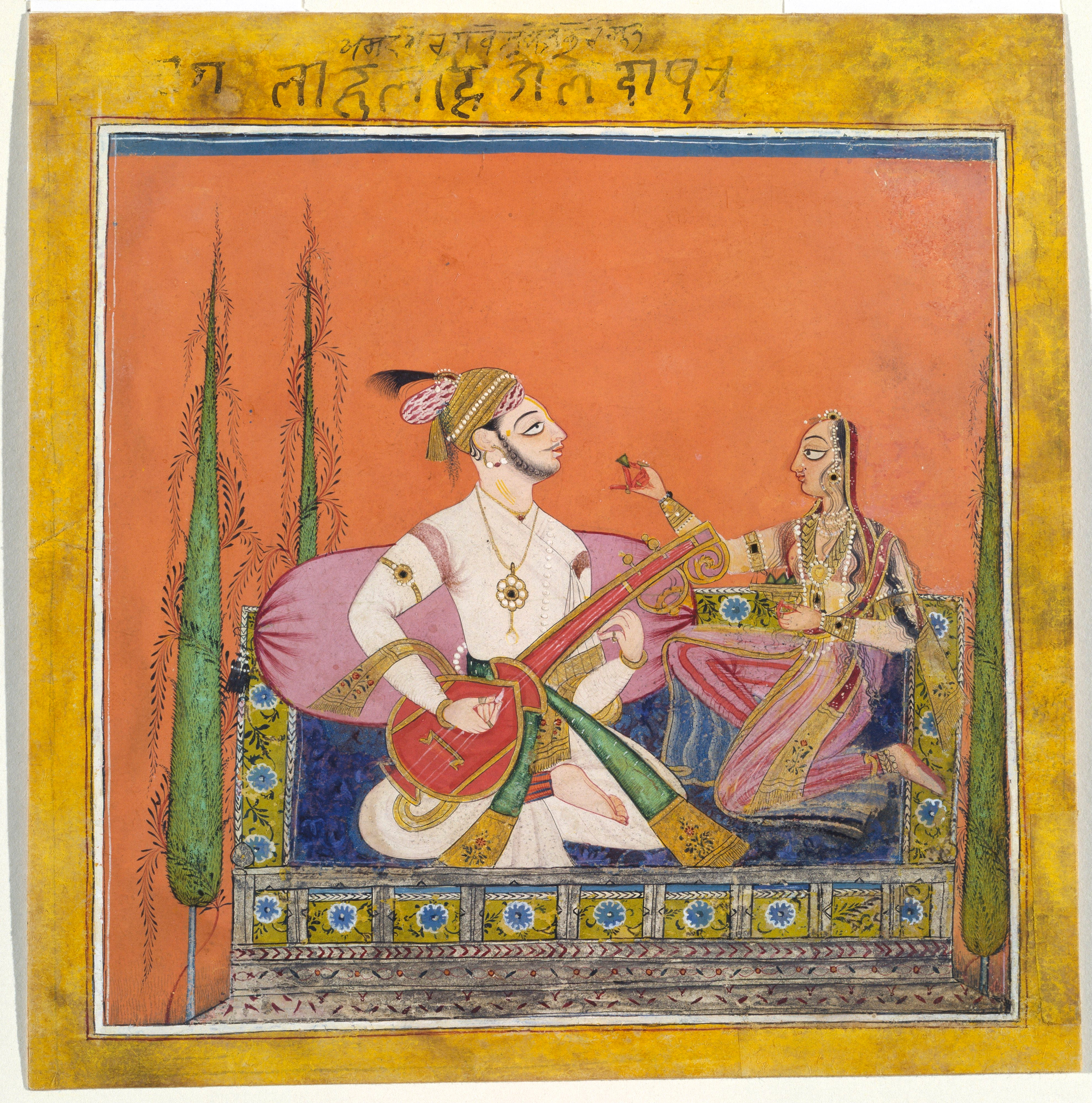
Ragaputra Velavala of Bhairava, Folio from a Ragamala series. Basohli, c. 1707–1715. Art Gallery of New South Wales.

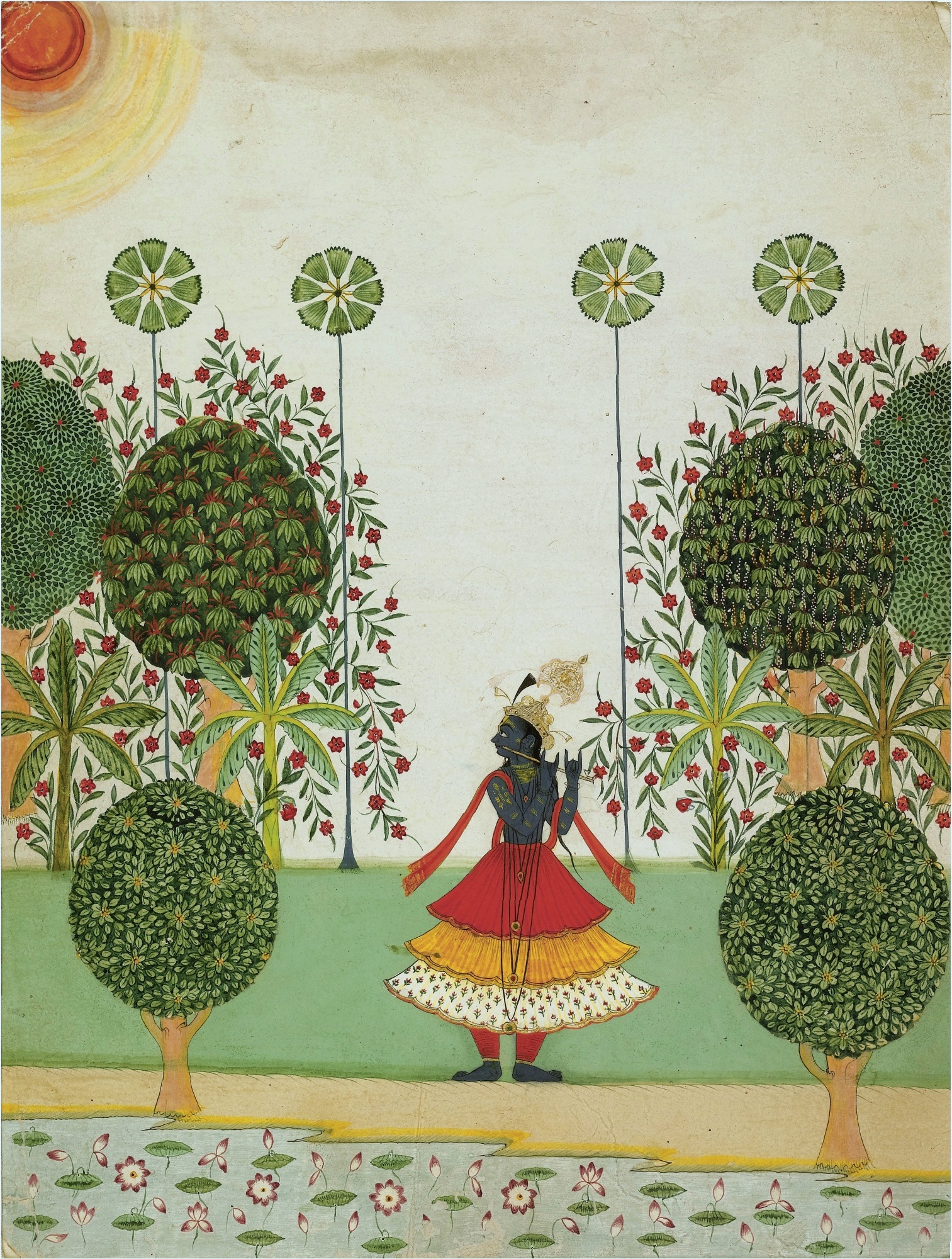
Krishna Fluting in the Forest. Jaipur, c. 1720–1740. Harvard Art Museums.

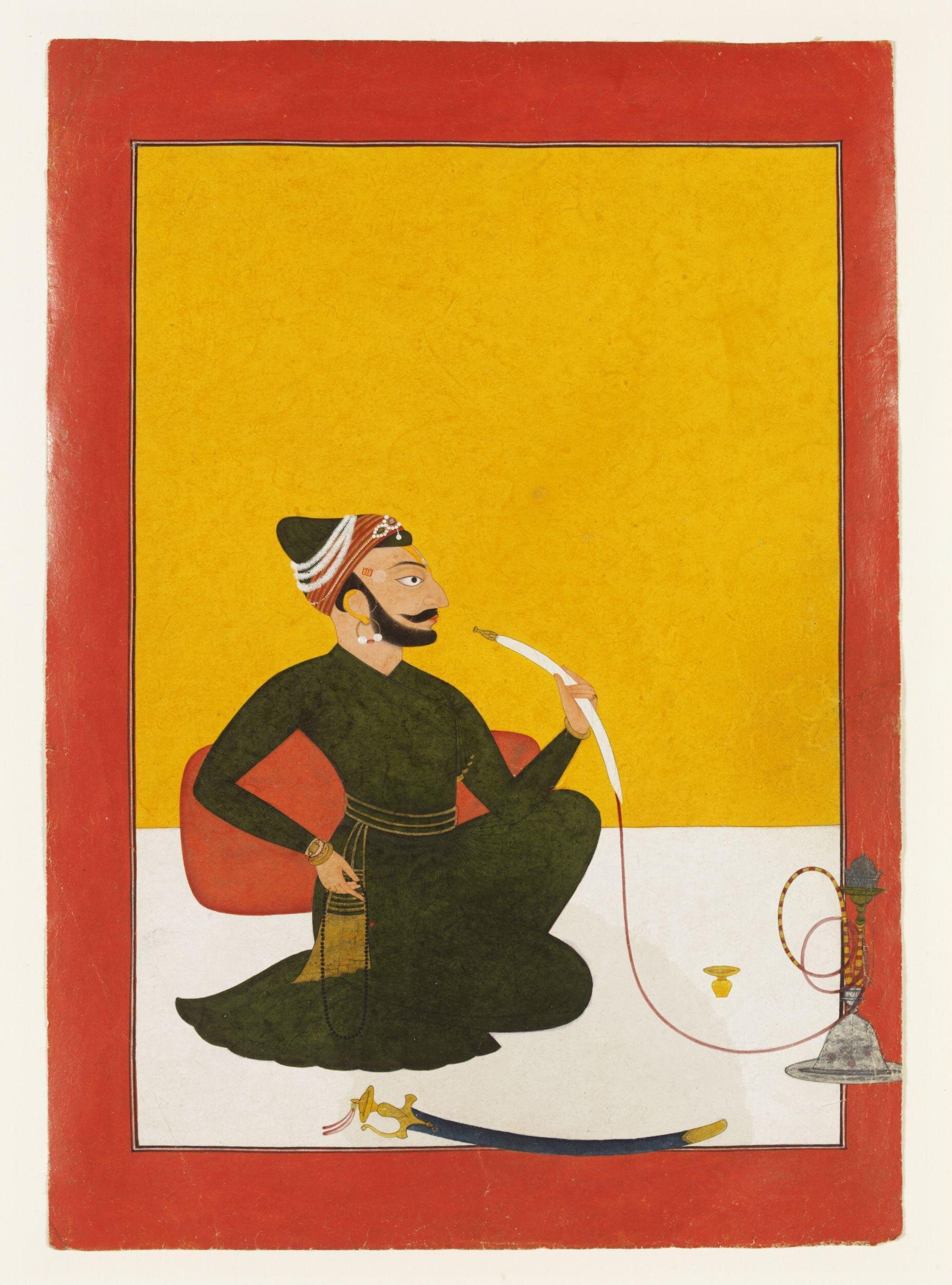
Raja Ajmat Dev. Mankot, c. 1730. Victoria and Albert Museum.

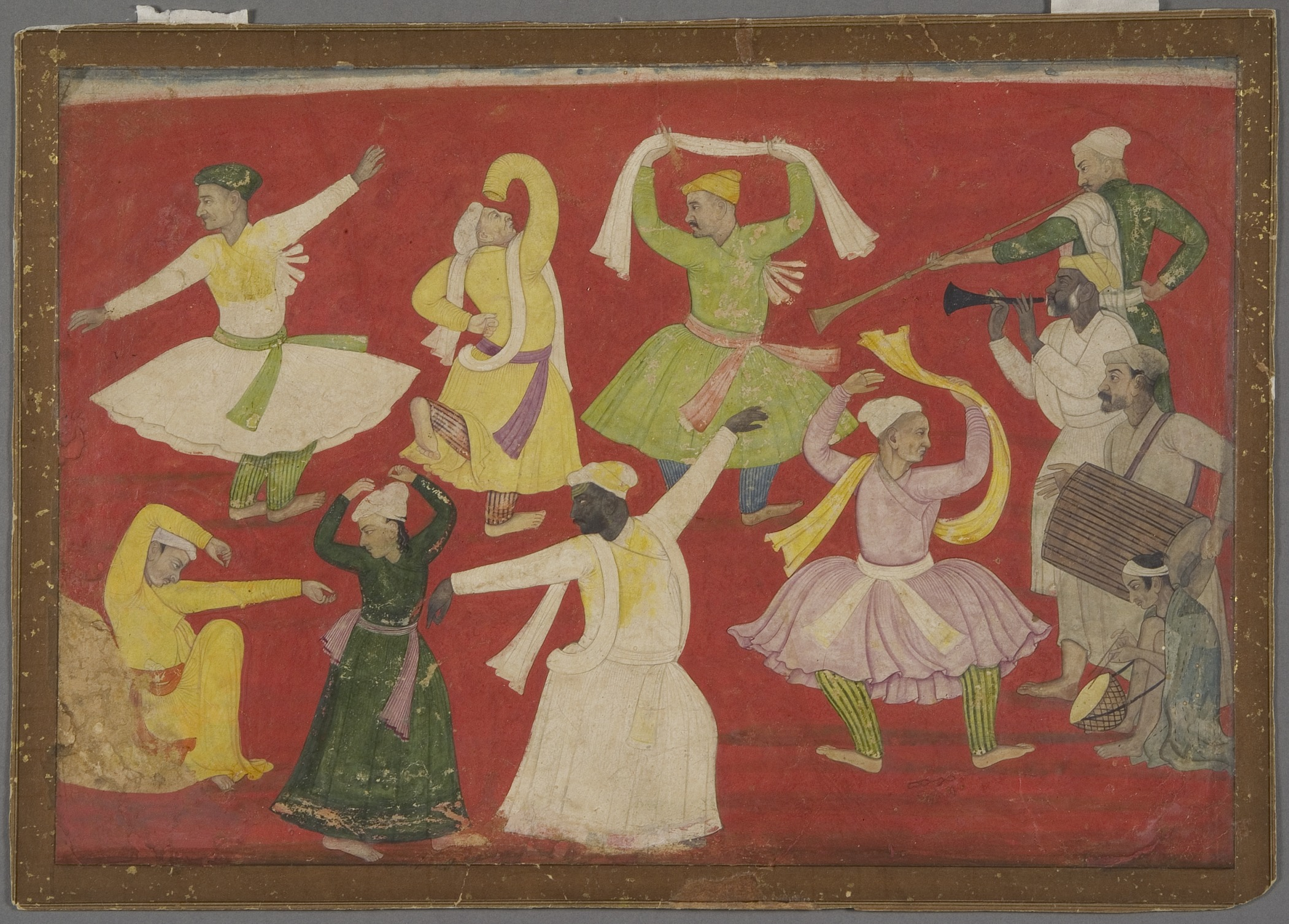
Dancing Villagers by Pandit Seu. Guler, c. 1730. Los Angeles County Museum of Art.

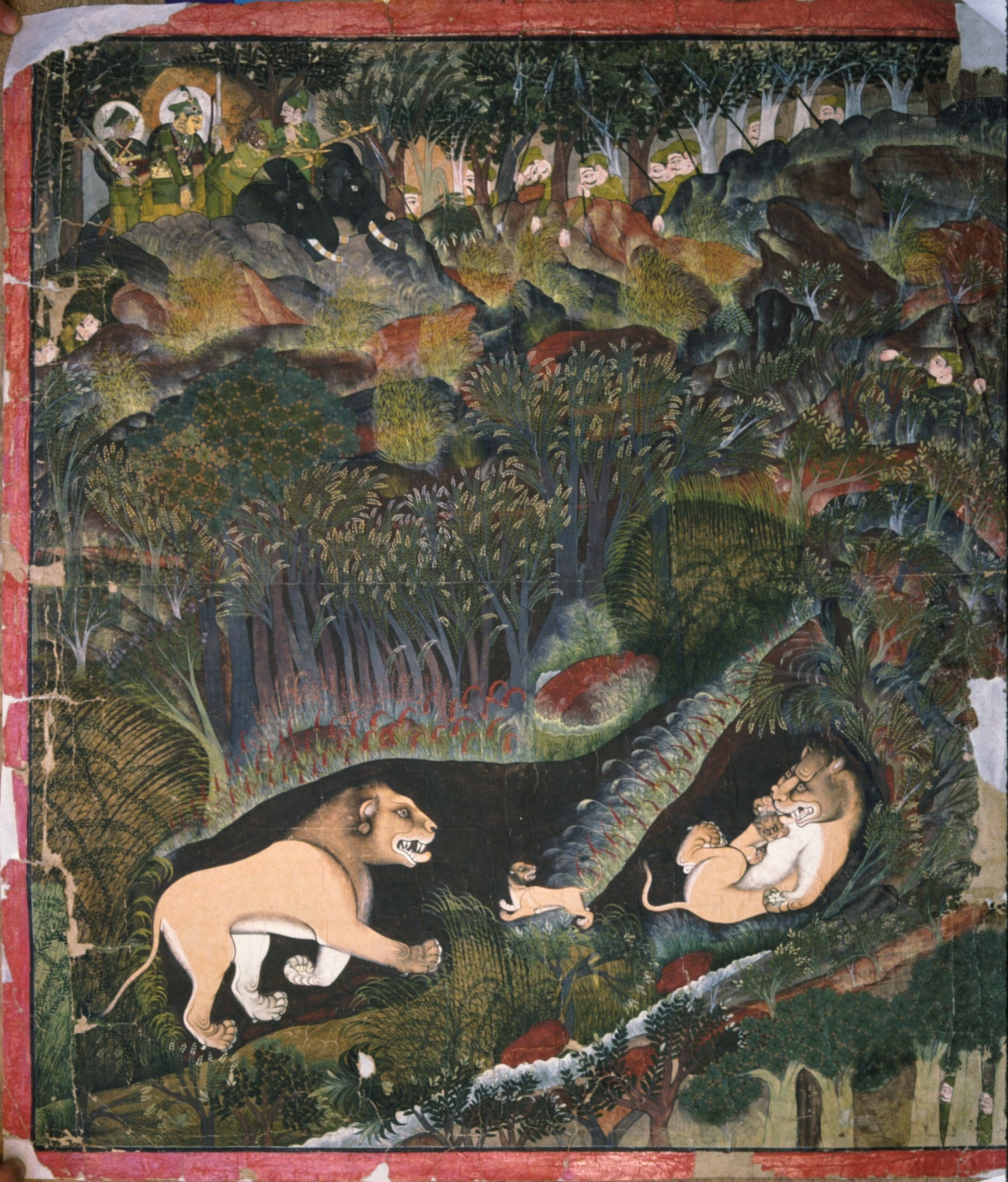
Brijnathji and Durjan Sal sight a pride of lions, attributed to anonymous painter assisted by Shaykh Taju. Kota, 1730–1735. Rao Madho Singh Trust Museum.

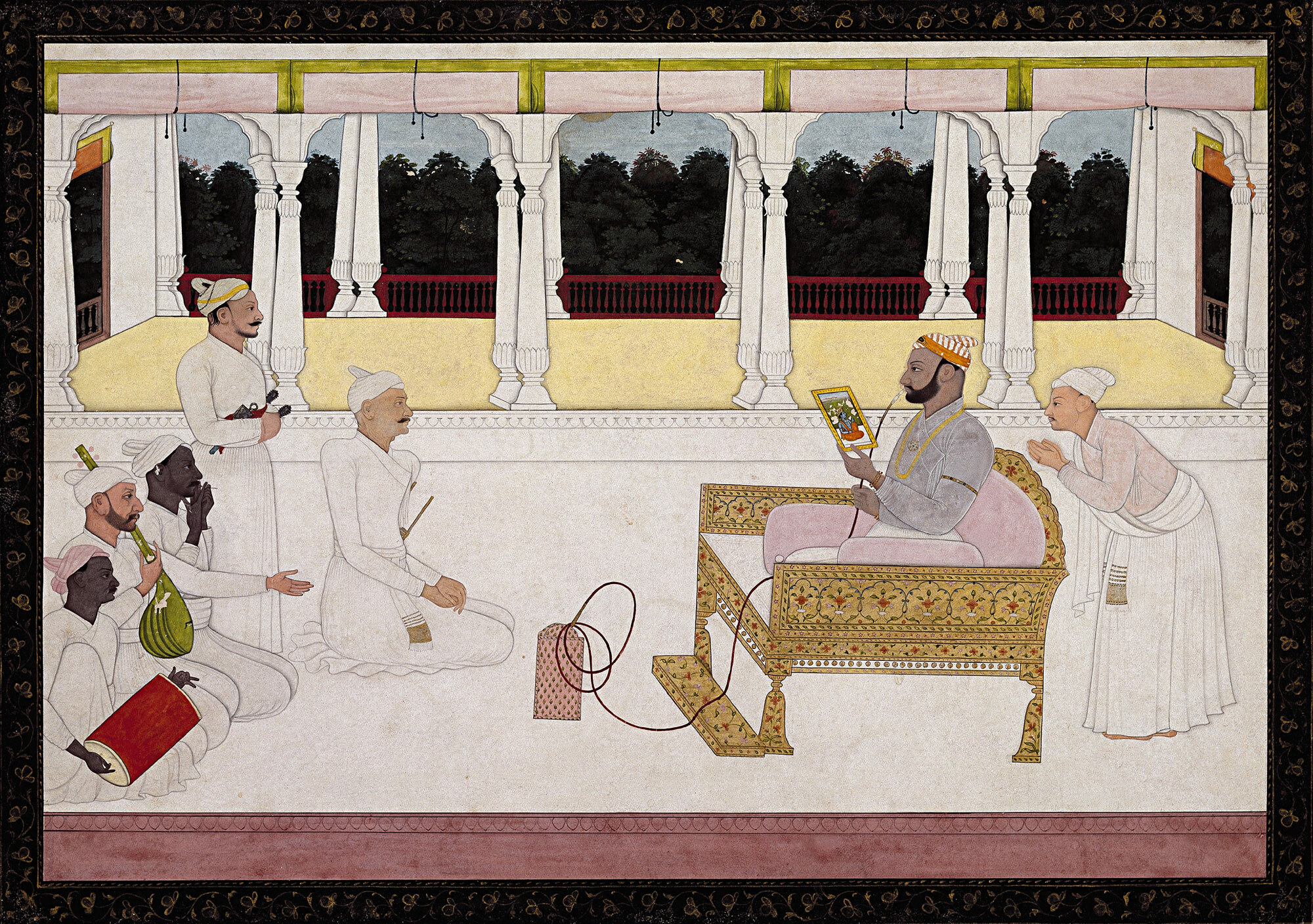
Raja Balwant Singh of Jasrota examining a painting with Nainsukh by Nainsukh. Jasrota, 1745–1750. Rietberg Museum.

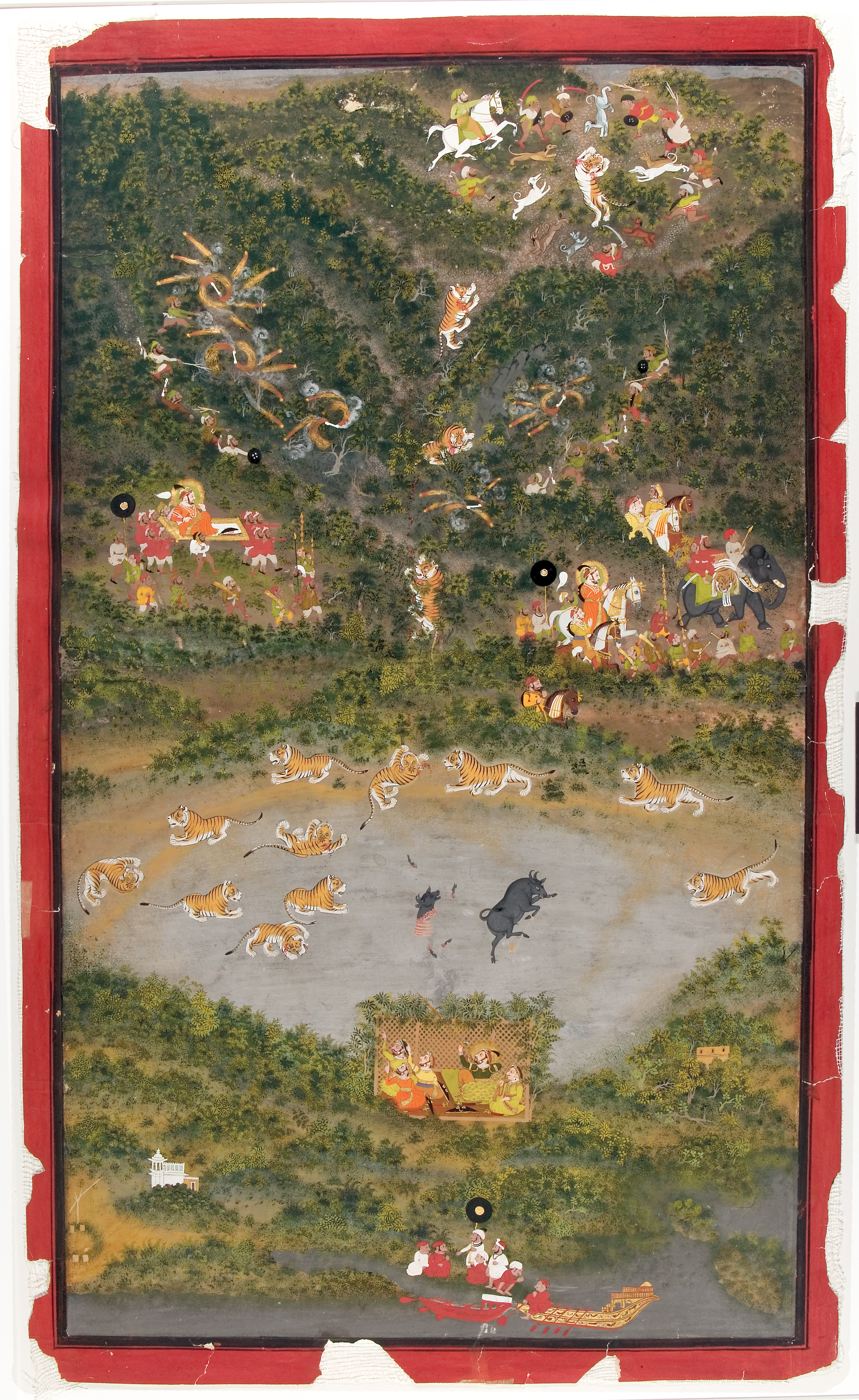
Maharana Jagat Singh II hunting tiger by Jiva. Mewar, 1749. San Diego Museum of Art.

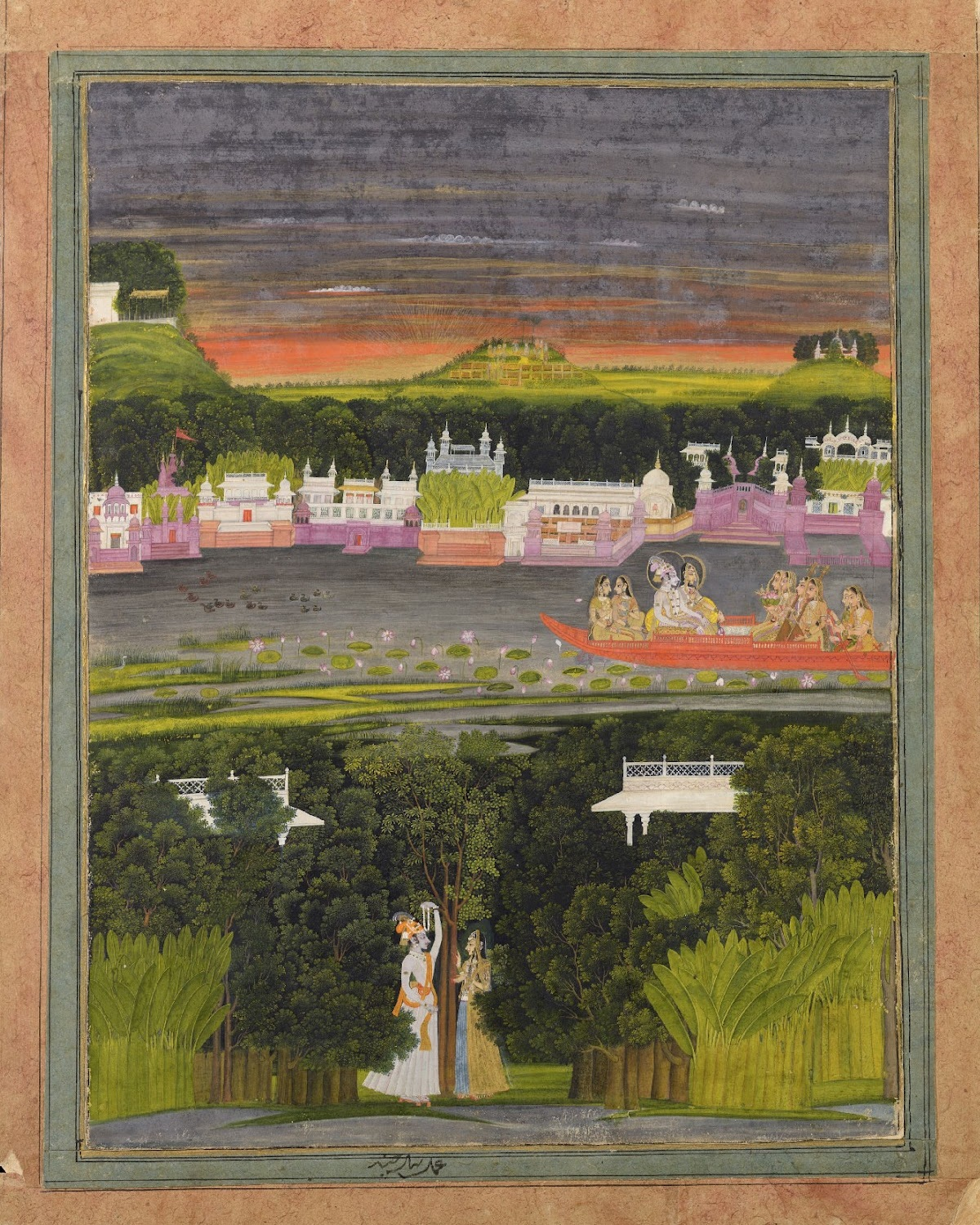
Radha and Krishna in the boat of love by Nihal Chand. Kishangarh, c. 1750. National Museum, New Delhi.

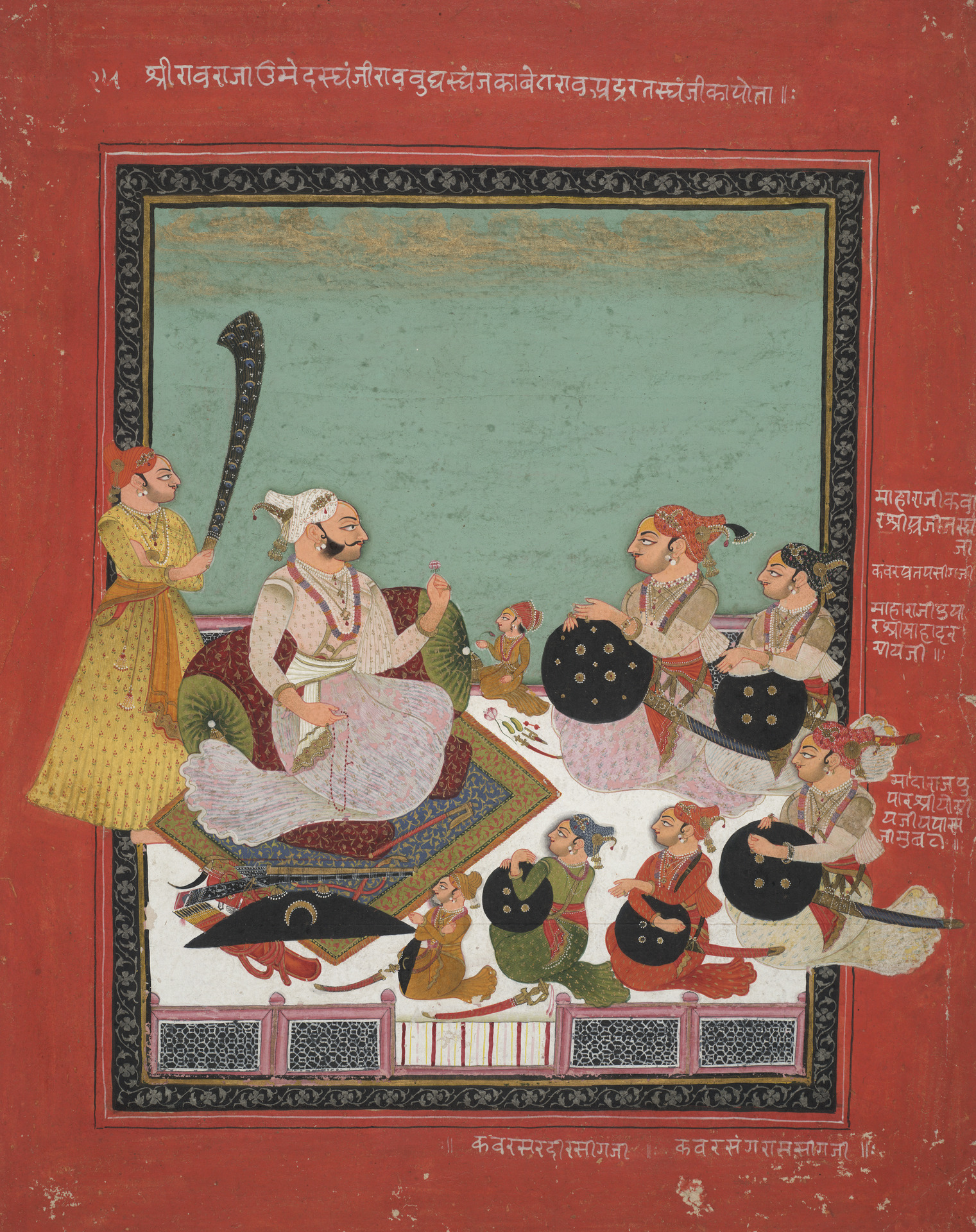
Umed Singh of Bundi with his Sons. Bundi, c. 1765. Yale University Art Gallery.

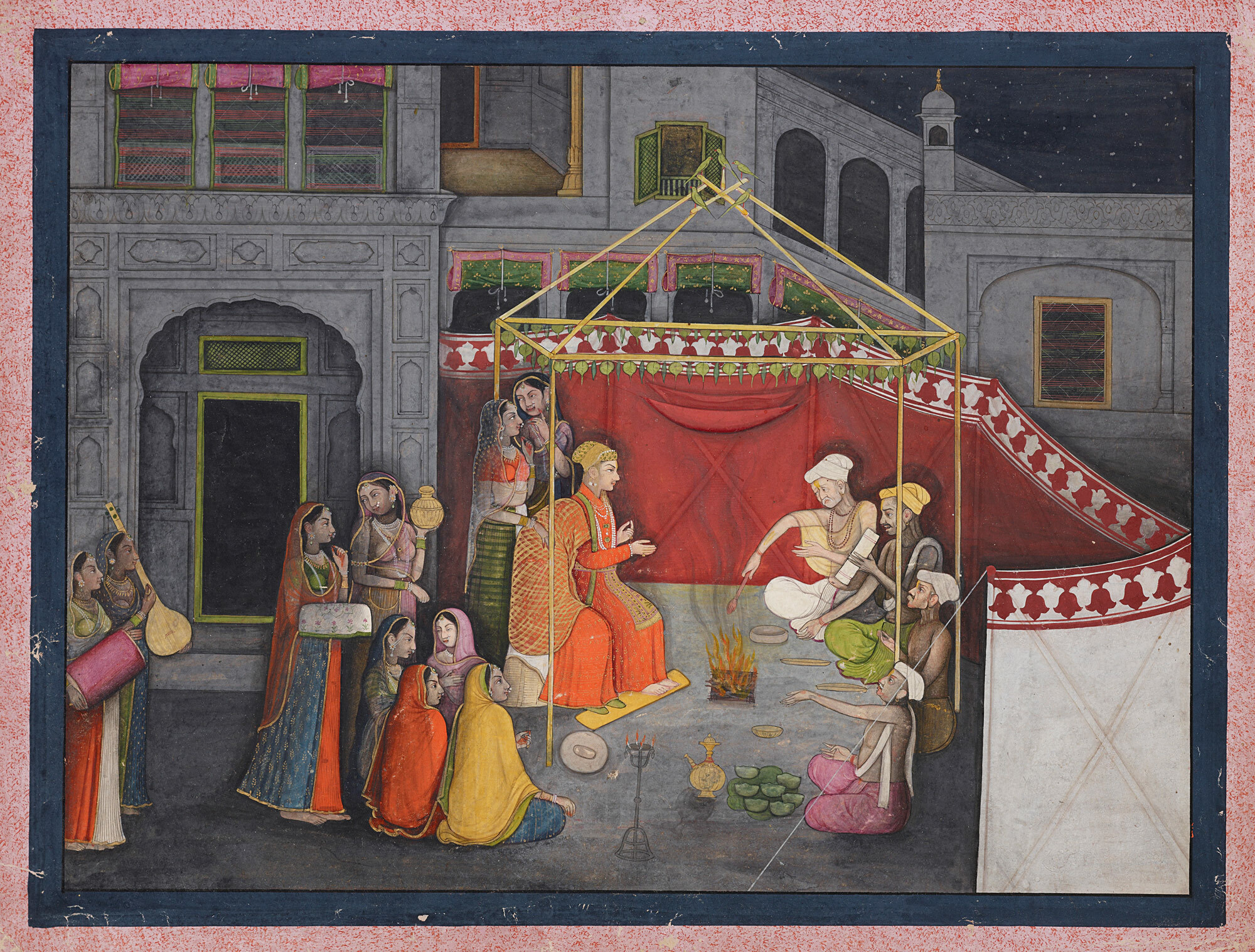
Wedding of Krishna's Parents, Folio from a Bhagavata Purana series. Ascribed to a Master of the first generation after Manaku and Nainsukh. Guler, c. 1770. Museum Rietberg.

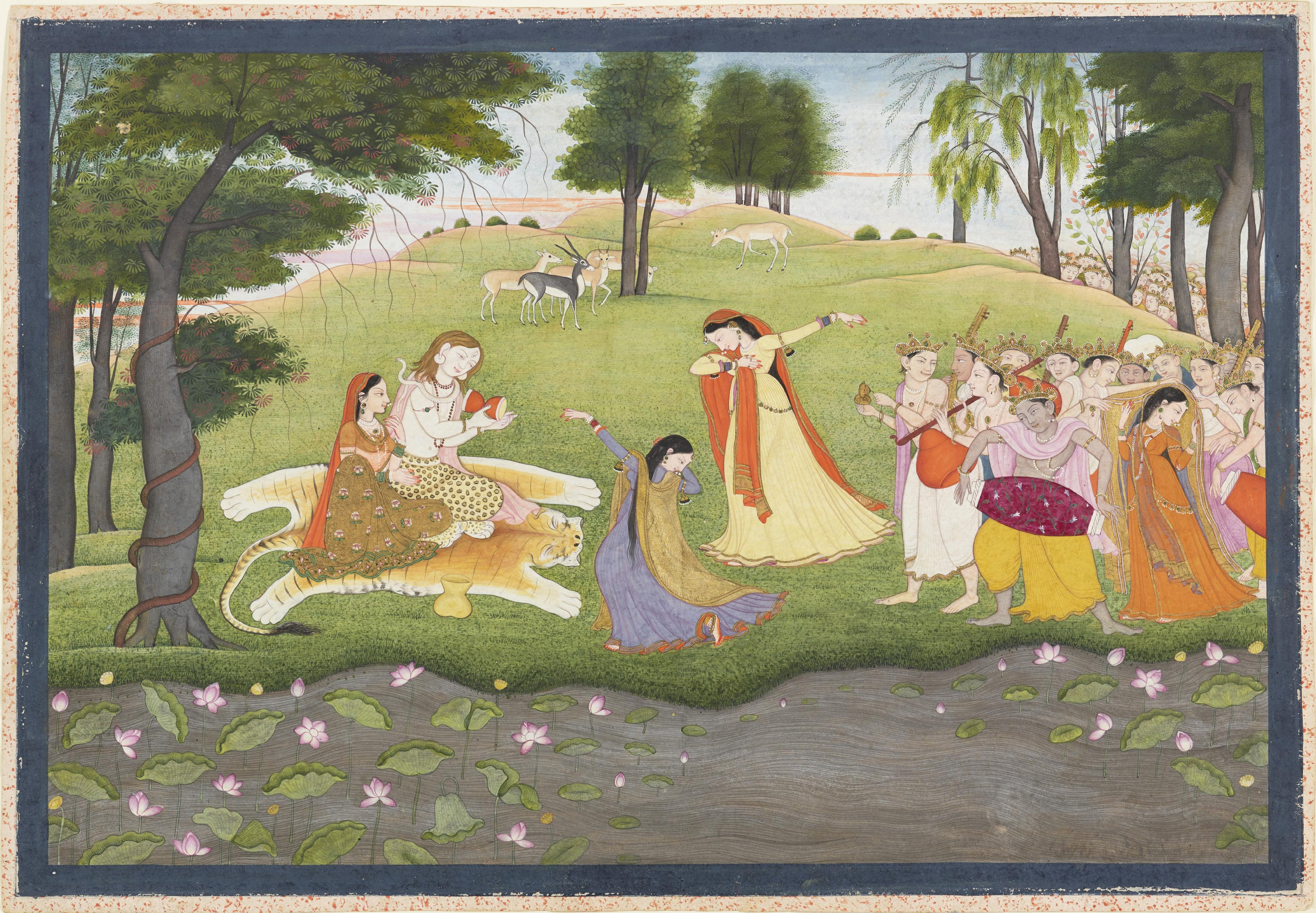
The Gods Sing and Dance for Shiva and Parvati, attributed to Khushala, son of Manaku. Kangra, c. 1780–1790. Philadelphia Museum of Art.

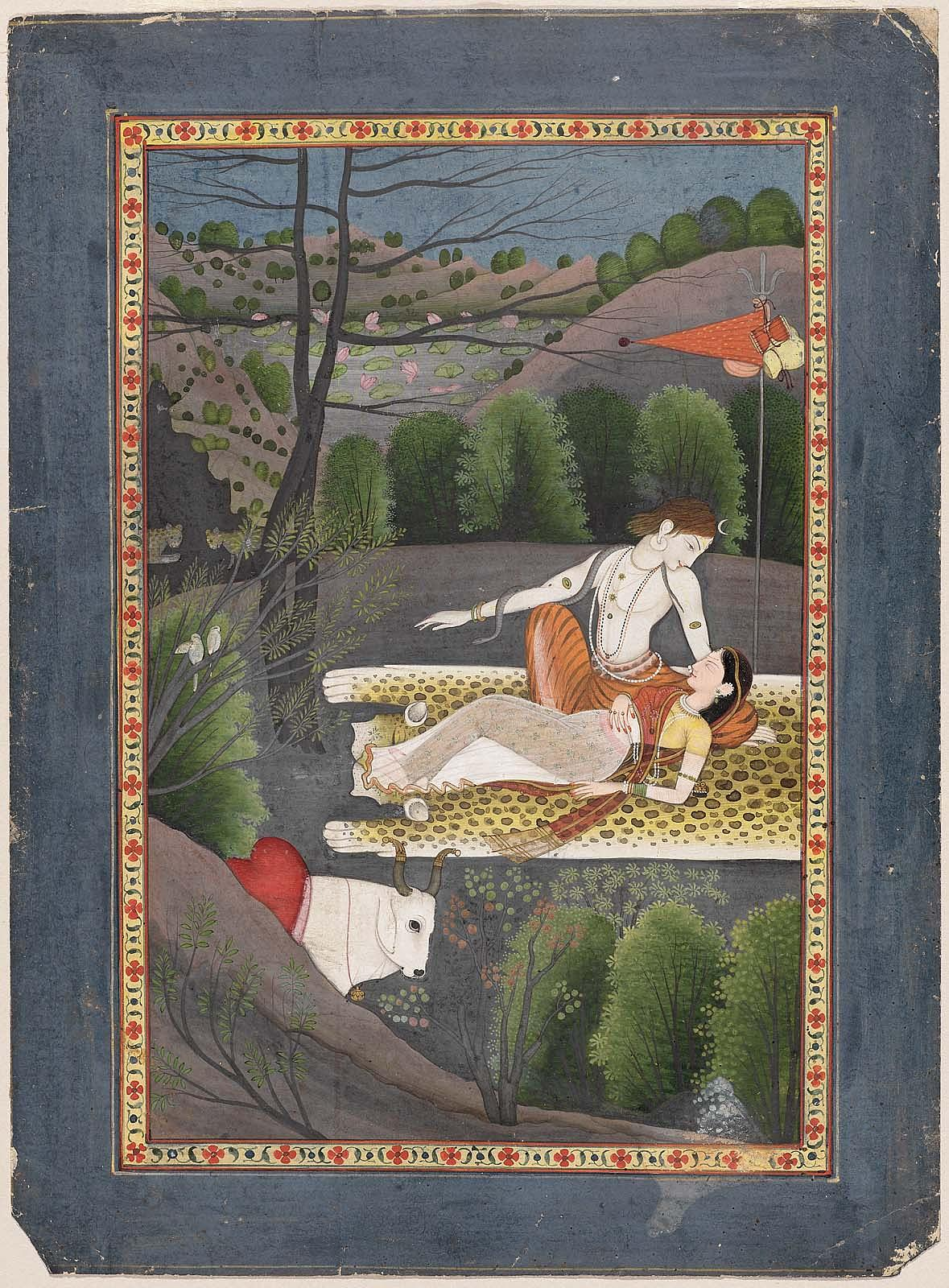
Shiva watches Parvati Sleep. Garhwal, c. 1780–1790. Museum of Fine Arts, Boston.

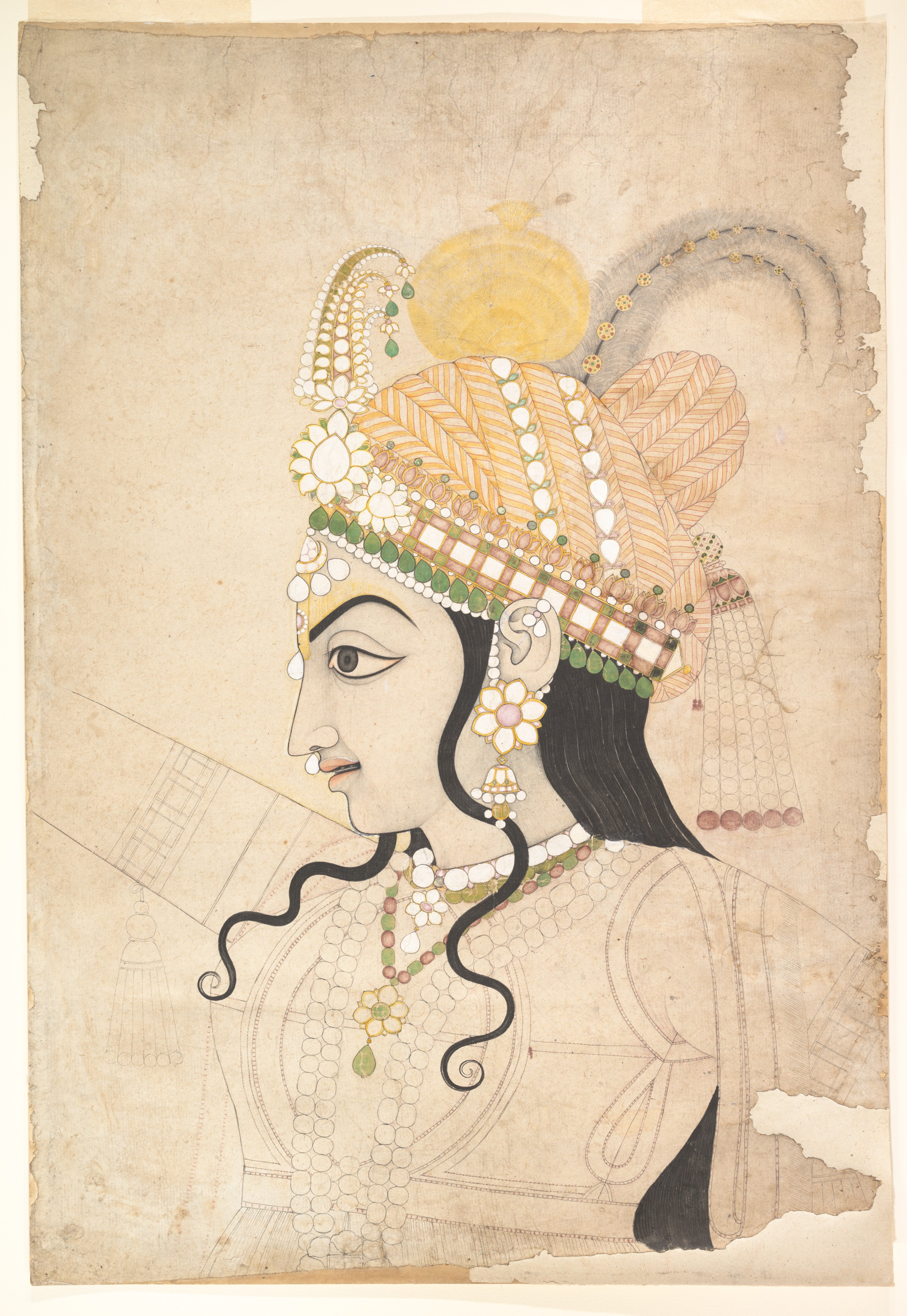
Head of Krishna: cartoon for a mural of the Raslila by Sahibram. Jaipur, c. 1800. Metropolitan Museum of Art.

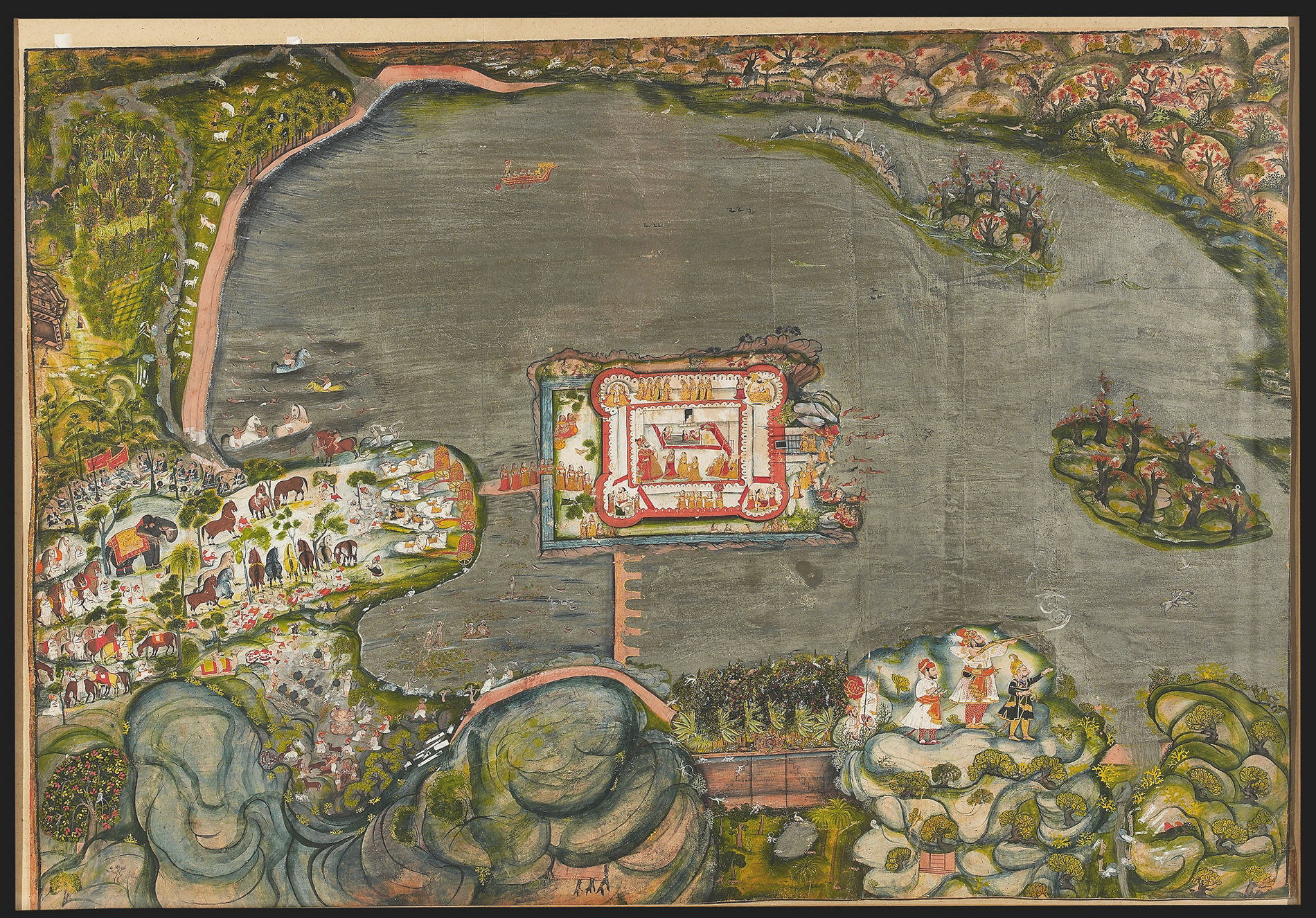
Ravat Gokul Das II at Sing Sagar Lake Palace by Bagta. Deogarh, 1806. Metropolitan Museum of Art.

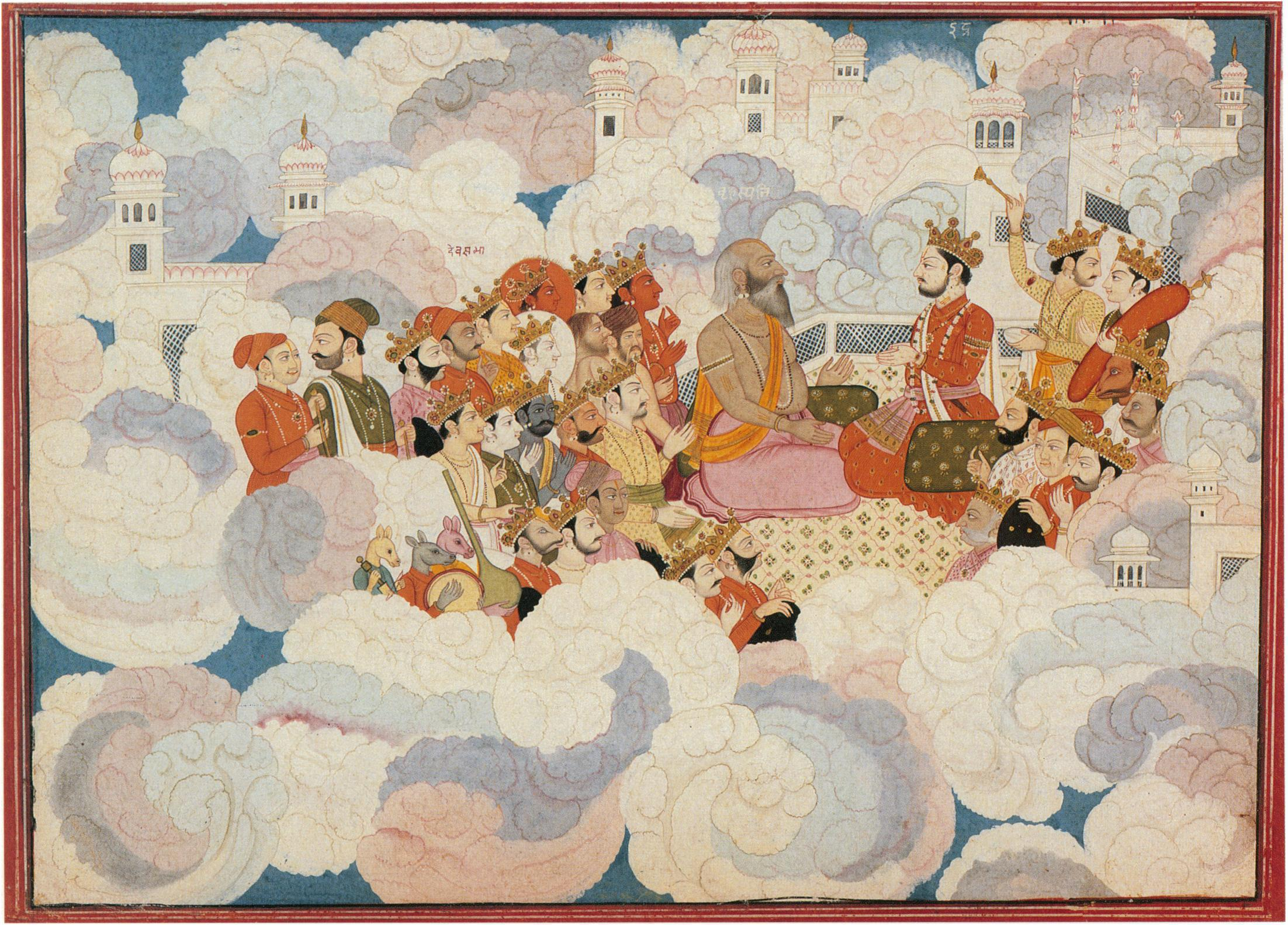
Indra consulting with his Preceptor in the Assembly of the Gods by Purkhu of Kangra. Kangra, c. 1800–1815. Government Museum and Art Gallery, Chandigarh.

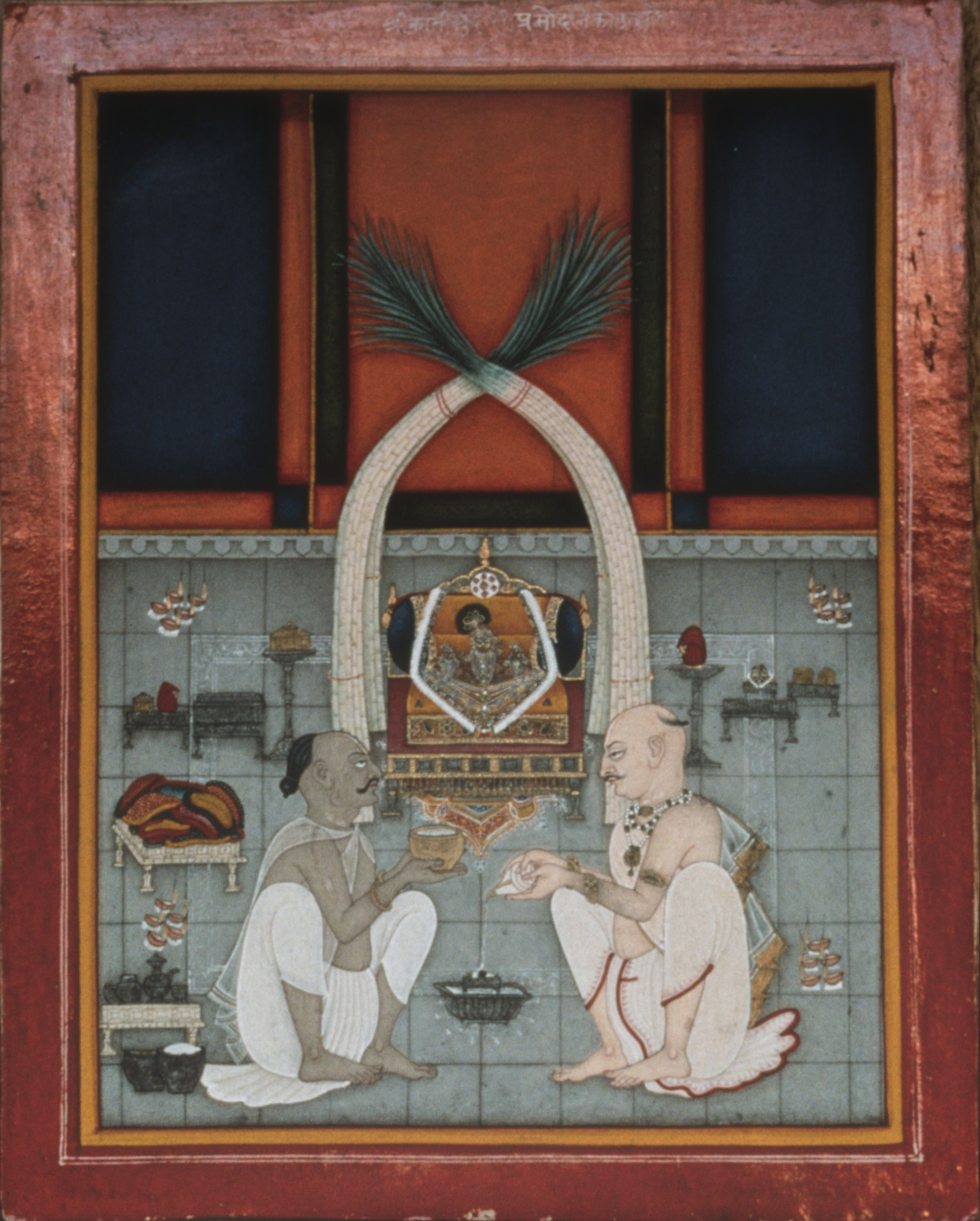
Maharao Kishor Singh of Kota Celebrating a Religious Festival. State of Kota was dedicated to Krishna in his Brijnathji form. On occasion of Prabodhini ('awakening') festival figure of Krishna and a small rock, representing the Mount Govardhan, were bathed in panchamrita, the 'five nectars': milk, yoghurt, clarified butter, honey and sugar. In the painting Maharao crouches at right, looking very much like a priest of a temple - bare of upper body, clad only in a pristine white dhoti, head completely shaven, a long vertical tilaka on the forehead - with only his rich jewellery setting him apart from the priest at left. He pouring milk from a conch shell held reverently in both hands, over the sacred, symbolic rock. On the gilstering marble floor, placed on pedestals or receptacles, lie objects used in the ritual: five earthen lamps in the four corners, flasks, paan boxes, Yamuna water in ewers covered with red cloth. In the very centre of painting, resting on a simhasana (throne) is placed the sacred image of Brijnathji, sporting a peacock-feather crown, his two consorts flanikng him. And over it, made with sugar-cane stalks tied at the top, an arched canopy looms, following prescribed ritual. Kota, c. 1831. Rao Madho Singh Trust Museum.

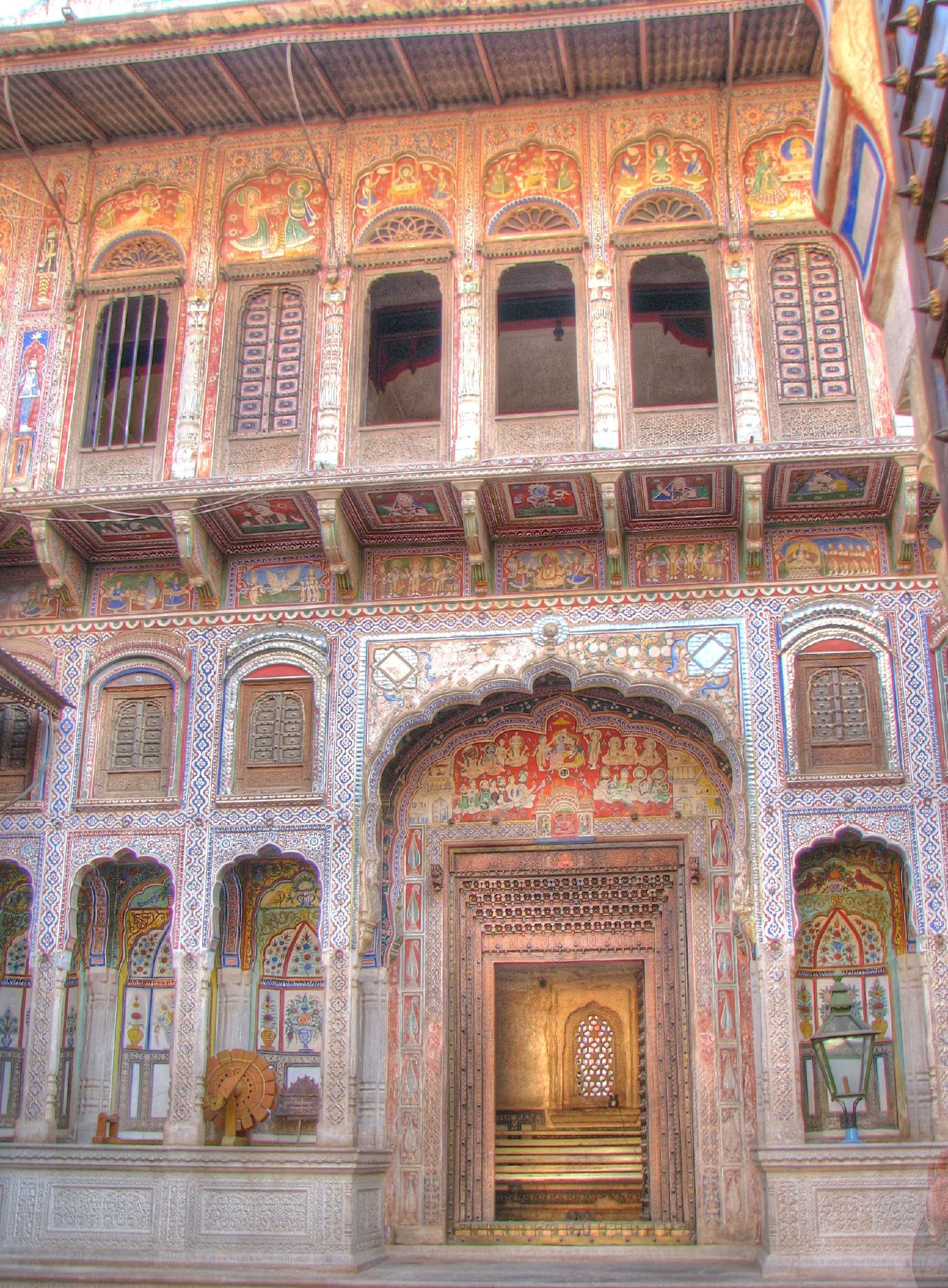
Painted Haveli in Nawalgarh, an example of Shekhawati painting

=== Rajput and Mughal painting ===
Decline of imperial patronage under Aurangzeb means that at the beginning of the 18th century, Rajput painting was the dominant style of Indian painting. At this point in time, Rajput palaces contained gardens, courtyards, pavilions, and durbar halls in the Mughal fashion, court dress and manners often followed Mughal standards, and many painters used finer pigments to paint subtler perceptions of the natural world in softer colors. "Neither architects nor painters working for Rajput patrons adopted anything more than this superficial appearance of Mughal taste, however. Even when painting portraits - a Mughal inspired subject - the Rajput artist showed no sustained interest in the visual specificity, or individual psychological comprehension, that was so distinctive a Mughal contribution to Indian art. Figures remained types. The regard for human portraiture so remarkable in the works of such Mughal artists as Govardhan or Hashim is found virtually nowhere in Rajput painting".

The difference of attitude is nowhere more obvious than in the treatment of space. A sense of spatial depth "is basic to the mature phase of Mughal painting. By creating a visual equivalent for empty space, in which solid forms are carefully located, the boundaries and thus the inherent separateness of these forms is affirmed". Rajput artist sought to show instead the inseparability of forms, and found it more effective to use a less scientific space, even to deny the concept of empty space. In Maharao Jagat Singh of Kota in a Garden (see illustration) or Maharaja Jaswant Singh of Jodhpur listening to music (see illustration), for example, "the background is as aesthetically expressive and assertive as the human figures".

The individual uniqueness of physical forms is denied also in other ways, because Hindu poetry continually presents forms and shapes as metaphors and symbols evoking other, quite different sensations, of more universal, often religious quality. Therefore, Hindu paintings too seek to generalize and, for example, the stance of the ruler in Rajput art describe rather some universal quality, like pride, than a specific physiognomy.

All of this does not change the fact, that a general trend throughout Rajput painting in this period is a growing interest in spatial realization, even if not achieved through linear perspective, consequent on a movement of artists from Delhi to Rajput courts. This is linked with reinvigoration of Mughal painting under the patronage of Muhammad Shah (r. 1719–1748), whose "reign was long enough for a distinctive style to flower". Mughal artists again experimented with light and space and the depiction of buildings in almost perfect perspective is particularly successful. This minor renaissance ended abruptly in 1739 when Nader Shah invaded India and sacked Delhi. After this "all who could flee from Delhi did so" and many painters made their way to Rajput courts. Their new approach to space allowed newer subjects such as group portraiture, durbar scenes, recording of court ceremonial and grand hunts to enter the traditional repertoire of the Rajput studios.

=== Mewar ===
A good example of adaptation of a new technique, only to reinforce traditional sensibilities, are works of a painter from Mewar called by today scholars Stipple Master (fl. c. 1692 - 1715). This anonymous artist got his name from his technique of a "grisaille", a progressively linear "painted drawing" style, often allowing the buffbackground paper to remain uncolored (see illustration of Maharana Amar Singh II with Ladies of the Zenana outside the Picture Hall at Rajnagar). The technique almost certainly originated in the modelling formulas found in European prints, and was previously used in Mughal and Deccan painting. In works of Stipple Master, however, lines of shading do not follow the effects of light, but repeat and reinforce the linear definition of the drapery outlines and folds. The same contour shading was used in Ajanta paintings and Rajasthani Ragamalas and "while it gives to forms a sense of weight and mass, it also emphasizes the way those forms fit together with other shapes on the picture surface; it integrates, rather than separates, forms. Once again, the European source was used in a way totally compatible with traditional sensibilities and techniques".

Prior to that time, Mewar court painters primarily produced manuscripts, and some portraits, and used a flat application of primary colors, with almost no shading, little or no perspective and showed only limited consideration for realistic representation. Stipple Master used his technique to produce accurate and intimate portraits of Amar Singh (r. 1698 - 1710), as well as some large court scenes and "this innovation of court reportage above all determined the course of the later Udaipur school. Under Sangram Singh II (r. 1710-1734), scenes of darbars, festivals, hunts, temple visits, animal fights and other spectacles became ever larger and more populous and detailed, providing a comprehensive record of the ruler’s public life and the activities of his court". Mughal models became submerged in the vigorous, sometimes naively archaic compositions of the Mewar artists, who continued to experiment with consecutive narration and multiple viewpoints. (see illustration of Maharana Jagat Singh II hunting tiger)

These large-format paintings illustrating the doings of the Maharana and his court were continued by Jagat Singh II (r. 1734–1751) and his successors. The best of the outside scenes, in their naturalistic rendition of hills and skies, show landscape conventions taken from the Mughal painting of the Muhammad Shah period, perhaps introduced by the artist Jai Ram (fl c. 1720–51). Jai Ram seems to have been the driving force also behind the series of at least ten upright-format paintings of Rāsalīlā (religious dance dramas) performed before Jagat Singh II. In the reign of Ari Singh (r. 1761–1773) even more of these scenes were painted, "although some artists, including the youthful Bagta, were able to rise above the general level and impose some order on the often chaotic earlier style in the rendition of both landscape and architecture".

After this date painting at Udaipur fell into decline until the early 19th century. Some of the artists took up employment at the minor courts of the nobles, among them Bagta (fl 1756–1811), who spent the remainder of a long career working at Deogarh. Here, in works of Bagta, his son Chokha (fl 1799–1824) and Chokha's son Baijnath (fl c. 1825–40) "a vigorous variant of the Udaipur style flourished for at least three generations". The Udaipur style was reinvigorated by the return of Chokha to Udaipur and later work of the leading artist of the Sardar Singh (r. 1842–1861) court, Tara (fl 1836–68). Mewar painting, concentrated on court activities of its rulers, existed in a diminished form and with increasing European influence until the abolition of princely powers in 1949 brought an end to royal patronage.

=== Bundi and Kota ===
Bundi and Kota paintings continued previous themes and styles and began for the first time seriously to investigate portraiture. A succession struggle in Bundi at the beginning of this period prevented any serious royal patronage until the reign of Umed Singh (1739–1770), from whose reign we have his portrait with his sons (see illustration), one of the key paintings of the later Bundi style. According to Jeremiah P. Losty "this was on a generally small scale with themes mostly concentrating on female subjects and erotic subjects with hot passionate colors. Figures are often set often against a cool white architecture, another offshoot of Mughal painting under Muhammad Shah, but with strange shading round the face. In the meantime some Bundi artists had migrated to the small state of Uniara and also to nearby Kota". By the end of the 19th century, Bundi painting was replaced by photography.

In Kota "there developed one of the most instantly appealing genres of Rajput painting, the great hunting scenes in which the Maharaos pitted themselves against tigers, lions, boars and wild elephants". The Kota artists of this period headed by Shaykh Taju were master draftsmen who brushed their animals with the skill of calligraphers and the generally sparse color tones of these pictures allow the quality of the draftsmanship to shine through. Landscape is viewed from on high, and the ground appears to slope upwards under a dense coverage of trees marching up the hillside often interspersed with overarching bamboos and ending in a fringe of trees crowning the topmost line. Kota artists drew often from life, and their sketches are some of the liveliest ever produced in Indian art.

Large-format miniature paintings of hunting scenes were produced especially during the reign of Umed Singh (r. 1770–1819). Still, Kota painters also made portraits and Ragamalas, with Ragamala set of 1768 having over 240 miniatures (Udaipur, Sarasvati Bhavar lib.). Another strain of Kota painting is religious art, much of which is linked to increased interest in Krishna and Rama, with paintings focused on Brijnathji form of Krishna (linked with Shrinathji cult in Nathdwara) forming its own subgenre (see illustration of Maharao Kishor Singh of Kota Celebrating a Religious Festival). Painting in Kota received its last important impetus under Ram Singh (r. 1827–66), who sponsored art focusing on his court and religious activities (see illustration of Maharao Ram Singh II of Kotah and companions playing Holi on elephants in a street). Shatru Sal (r. 1866–89) was the last important patron of Kota painting, which by the end of the 19th century had disappeared altogether.

=== Bikaner ===
In the 18th century, Bikaner painters continue their work in the characteristic, largely delicate and poetic style, which combined Deccani and Mughal influences. Ustad Murad (fl 1705–1722) was master of this style and his influence continued at Bikaner for some decades. Matrimonial ties with Marwar and Jaipur in the latter years of the reign of Zorawar Singh (reg 1736–45) and the first half of that of Gaj Singh (r. 1746–87) had an impact on painting. Some works maintain Bikaner style, but others show a dominant Marwar influence. Until the third quarter of the century "human expressions remained lively, and landscape was well treated, if conventional. However, paintings lost their subtlety, and compositions were less well integrated".

Gaj Singh patronized over 200 artists, who excelled in precision and refinement, but showed little interest in psychology, and their style became hard and artificial. Continued political and matrimonial ties with Jaipur led to a further influx of Jaipur artists into the court workshops during the reigns of Surat Singh (r. 1787–1827) and Ratan Singh (r. 1827–51) and new painters usurped the prestige and landholdings of local lineages. Interaction between an already degenerate Jaipur style and the Bikaner idiom created a new hybrid style, characterized by crudely modelled figures, ornamental foliage and trees and a preference for an unusual shade of an almost acidic green. A treaty signed with the British in 1818 and the advent of the Company painting dealt a heavy blow to the Bikaner school. However, a small group of artists continued to work in the declining royal ateliers of Saradar Singh (1851–72) and his successors.

=== Marwar ===
In 1678 Jodhpur was taken under Mughal control, a situation that lasted until the Aurangzeb's death in 1707, when Ajit Singh (r. 1707–24) was able to recapture his kingdom. With Mughals to Marwar come a taste for equestrian portraiture and influence of imperial painting was consolidated by arrival of Dalchand (fl c. 1720–1750) at the court of Abahai Singh (r. 1724–1749). Trained in Delhi Dalchand, as its most gifted exponent, epitomize "the virtuosity and formality of 18th-century painting in Marwar".

Without Dalchand's sensitivity or refinement the Jodhpur portrait style reverted to one of relatively flat compositions in brilliant colors for the rest of the century and as early as 1720 the style had spread to various thikanas. Among them the most important centres of painting was Ghanerao and Nagaur - the last one the residence of Bakht Singh (r. 1751–1752) before his brief reign in Jodhpur. Vijay Singh (r. 1752–1793) patronized the production of illustrated pothī manuscripts of the Vaishanava texts "in dimensions never before attempted. Their style is in many ways a continuation of the earlier garden style at Nagaur".

Marwar painting entered its most prolific phase during the reign of Man Singh (r. 1803–43), who was an enthusiastic patron of the arts, as well as an ardent believer of the Nath sect. During his reign large-scale pothī manuscripts of sacred Nath texts were produced in a hard-edged brilliant style glittering with gold, but he commissioned also many other religious and secular manuscripts, as well as court paintings. The most important artists of this period were Amar Das, Shiva Das and Bulaki (all fl c. 1820–50). Tradition of Marwar painting ended during the reign of Jaswant Singh II (r. 1873–95), a progressive and Western-looking ruler, who in emulation of Victorian England recorded courtly life and the nobles of neighbour states by photograph.

=== Kishangarh ===
Kishangarh was one of the smallest Rajput states, but brilliance of its painting, characterized by a unique lyrical sensibility, "secures Kishangarh’s important position among the numerous schools of Indian painting". Earliest dated Kishangarh painting comes from 1694 and, like other works from this period, demonstrate a close stylistic affinity to contemporary Mughal painting. Raj Singh (r. 1706–48) was great patron of the arts and a painter himself. In 1719 to Kishangarh came Delhi artist Bhavanidas (c. 1680/85 - d. after 1748), who was followed by his son Dalchand (as was mentioned earlier he also painted in Jodhpur) and nephew Kalyan Das. Bhavanidas was a teacher of Nihal Chand (c. 1710–1782), whose paintings represent the quintessential Kishangarh idiom. It has been assumed that the classic Kishangarh style resulted from the relationship between Savant Singh (r. 1748–1764), who was a poet and devotee of Krishna, and his uniquely gifted artist, who created lyrical masterpieces in idyllic settings corresponding to the idealized sacred places. His paintings depict the idealized lovers Radha and Krishna who "are both depicted with impossibly slender waists, arching backs and sloping profiles with huge eyes upturned at the corner (the Radha figure supposedly based on Savant Singh's mistress Bani Thani); these mannerisms permeate Kishangarh painting throughout our period".

Although painting continued at Kishangarh under later rulers, "by the late 18th century the early delicacy was often replaced by a hardening of the line and an exaggeration of the distinctive Kishangarh facial features that result in near caricature". Later works reflect a movement away from the Mughal-influenced idiom of the 18th century "and towards the general Rajasthani style of the 19th. Gone is the characteristic Kishangarh female facial type of the mid-18th century, as too are the refined execution and air of romantic nostalgia".

=== Jaipur ===
Amber painting in the 17th century was under the strong Mughal influence, "but in the new century Amber artists take little interest in Mughal spatial conventions, especially in their ragamala paintings". In 1728 Sawai Jai Singh (r. 1699–1743) transferred capital to Jaipur, where he established a sprawling complex devoted to the arts of the book. Sawai Jai Singh had a large collection of Mughal, Deccani and Rajasthani paintings and some Jaipur paintings of this period seems linked to art of Muhammad Shah era. Still, more usual are the many ragamala sets of the mid-century that convert the pavilion in the terrace scene and flatten the architecture (see illustration of Ragini Madhumadhavi - Girl flees from a storm). It is during this time that young artist, Sahibram (fl c. 1740–1805), came to prominence as a portraitist. He continued to work for five successive rulers, painting on cloth in the same style over life-size portraits in a personal style that became standard.

The Jaipur school reached its zenith under Pratap Singh (r. 1778–1803), a poet, composer and connoisseur of painting. The workshop flourished under his attention. Among the most notable illustrated manuscripts and sets of paintings are a Ragamala set of 43 paintings, a long Ramayana series, a Bhagavata Purana completed in 1792 with 366 illustrations and a Devi Mahatmya dated 1799 with 102 miniatures. There are also many others paintings, drawings and sketches from this period. Ragamala sets continued into the new century with an increasing lack of inspiration and Jaipur artists hardened their line and began to favor garishly colored subjects, with considerable influence from Lucknow. Patronage of painting continued during the troubled reign of Jagat Singh (r. 1803–18), however, after his death painters left the workshop in search of other employment. Jagat Singh II (r. 1835–80) promoted Western art, including photography, and the Jaipur style declined.

From the beginning of the 19th century, traders from the area of Shekhawati started to spend part of their riches in constructing enormous mansions. The wall paintings decorating these structures are distinctive and show a mixture of folk and classical idioms. Tradition of this simple and vigorous style, known today as Shekhawati painting, lived until the third decade of the 20th century.

=== Kulu ===
Painting in Kulu, one of the most remote states of the Punjab Hills, has a history dating back to at least the last quarter of the 17th century, and initially was under strong influence of Basohli style. The most important work of Kulu painting is a superb Ramayana series of 270 paintings, known as the Shangri Ramayana (see illustration of Rama Bestows His Possessions on the Brahmins, His Friends, and Servants). W.G. Archer classified those paintings into four styles and ascribed them to the period from c. 1690 to c. 1710. Scholarship is divided, however, on questions of both dating and place of production - Goswamy and Fischer have suggested Bahu in Jammu and inscription on a painting in the latter part of the series (New Delhi, N. Mus.), though not indisputably clear, indicates a date of [17]65 and mentions Mandi.

According to Goswamy and Fischer "with their flat, monochromatic backgrounds of rich, saturated yellow or sage green that leave no room for the horizon at the top, and their frenzied, convulsive energy, the paintings of the Ramayana appear to represent a closed, self-contained world. Within this world, a great deal happens: emotions pure and raw are internalized or expressed, figures and objects expand and contract while brilliant, blustering colours cast a glow over everything in sight [...] Patterns, foliage, architecture, colouring, articulation of figures, have all a logic of their own". Archer has thought that series is an offshoot of Basohli painting, but at the same time, he noticed some distinctive features of those paintings, like a lack of regard for orderly arrangement and deep sense of agitation and intensity. In the latter part of the series, compositions are more balanced and the faces of people and animals more expressive.

Shangri Ramayana shares a number of features with other works that can be assigned to Kulu at about the same period, like Ragamala series, a Nayikabheda series and illustrations of the Krishna legend. Paintings from c. 1710–40 "have simplified compositions and colour schemes showing a preference for mauve and blue. Common features include a willow tree with drooping branches framing a central figure, and swirling clouds with curly outlines. Paintings of the mid-18th century and later retain traits of the local style but also exhibit the influence of other centres of Pahari painting." Late 18th-century works include series of Bhagavata Purana and two sets of the Madhumalati painted in his individual style by the artist Bhagwan, who worked for Raja Pritam Singh (r. 1767–1806). Little development of the regional style occurred in the 19th century.

=== Mankot ===
Earliest painting in Mankot, one of the smallest of Pahari states, could be considered a local idiom of the Basohli style. In contrast, portraiture, which remained the main concern of Mankot painters until c. 1700, derived from Mughal examples under the Shah Jahan. The borders of those portraits are usually red, and the sitters are set against backgrounds of rich yellow or sage green (see illustration of Raja Ajmat Dev) and seated on colourful floral or striped carpets, which enhance the painting's decorative effect.

Works from c. 1700–20 show greater distortion, "a feature shared with Basohli painting, but the idiom is distinctively Mankot". It is in this period that Goswamy and Fischer place painter who worked on important Bhagavata Purana series, called by them simply Master at the Court of Mankot. According to them he excelled both in religious paintings (see illustration of Saptarishi. The Seven Sages), as in a portraiture, which "reveal in all details astounding observation". Religious paintings from Mankot avoid intricate detail in favour of a narrow focus on the drama of the scene. At the same time artists were apparently aware of trends in painting at Basohli and Nurpur and assimilated elements from both styles.

Later paintings from Mankot indicate influences from still other centres, like Bandralta, Jammu, Jasrota or Chamba. In works after c. 1750 "faces generally appear slightly heavier, and figures are shorter and squatter. Colours are more muted; compositions frequently employ clumps of foliage". Mankot court life was affected by Sikhs interventions in the 18th and 19th centuries and a general decline in painting set in. In 1846 Mankot state had lost its independence.

=== Chamba ===
Chamba was one of the largest states in the Punjab Hills and its sheltered location helped to preserve its distinct culture. The earliest known painting from the region is of the second quarter of the 17th century and its style is already distinct, which suggest a previous history. The figures are painted in a naturalistic manner and subdued, pale colours were generally preferred, with visible Mughal and Deccani influences. In works from the end of the 17th century, there is adoption of some elements of Basohli style. Rich, warm colours are used, and the treatment of the trees is decorative and stylized. "A peculiar idiom for modelling was used by Chamba painters: a series of fine, long lines drawn clearly and at regular intervals on garments was employed for indicating volume, especially of the arms" and it remained in practice for several decades in the 18th century.

There are two broad styles of the early 18th-century Chamba painting: one "with clear indigenous figural types but exhibiting the influence of the Basohli style in other elements", and the other much closer to Basohli painting. Political disturbances during the reign of Ugar Singh (r. 1720–35) means that only a few paintings of this period survive. The reign of Umed Singh (r. 1748–64) was marked by the activity of two painters, Laharu (d. c. 1767) and Mahesh (fl. c. 1730–1770). Chamba was always a Vaishnva state and at this period emphasis was laid on the production of relevant illuminated manuscripts, attributed to Laharu, while Mahesh seems to have worked on painted sets of Vishnu avatars (see illustration of Matsya, the Fish-Incarnation of Vishnu). According to Losty, "whereas Laharu's style is still rather old-fashioned, with flat, smallforms derived from earlier prototypes disposed uniformly about the surface of the painting or disposed in registers, Mahesh seems more conversant with the softened palette and enhanced spatial awareness of contemporary Guler work". This doesn't change the fact that in general 18th-century painters from Chamba show relatively little interest in innovations on the rendering of space and volume associated with Seu-Nainsukh family (see below)

Raja Raj Singh (r. 1764–1794) gave land to the painters from Seu-Nainsukh family, including Nikka, son of Nainsukh (c. 1710–1778). From this period come distinguished group portraits made for the Raja, but with Guler painters at the court local style gradually lost vitality. In 1821 Chamba lost part of its territory to the Gurkhas of Nepal and political decline affected painting. There are some works in Guler, Kangra and Punjabi styles that were made in 19th-century Chamba, but its native school of painting was now extinct.

=== Seu-Nainsukh Family and Kangra style ===
By 1730 there were signs of dramatic changes in Pahari painting "as artists softened their harsh lines, changed to more muted colors and displayed a renewed interest in rendering space and volume. These changes are traditionally associated with the artists Pandit Seu (c. 1680-1740) from Guler and his two sons Manaku (c. 1700-1760) and Nainsukh". The first evidence of this softening in style can be found in late works of Pandit Seu and more directly in Gita Govinda series from c. 1730 ascribed to Manaku. Because of the vivid flat planes of color and some other traits of older style this series is sometimes associated with Basohli painting, but "work is full of details that point the way forward in the enhanced naturalism of its characters and of its landscape, traits which are further emphasized in two successive and widely dispersed Bhagavata Purana series of c. 1740 and c. 1765" (see illustration of The Emergence of Varaha, the Boar-Incarnation of Vishnu).

There is no evidence that paintings of Manaku were executed in Basohli and in general there are not many indisputable Basohli works from the early 18th century, although there is some portraiture and Ragamala series (see illustration of Ragaputra Velavala of Bhairava). From the reign of Amrit Pal (r. 1757–78), the style of royal portraiture changed dramatically to the naturalistic style favoured by Nainsukh, who seems to have migrated to Basohli c. 1765. His son, Ranjha, also worked for Basohli rulers, but as a centre of painting "Basohli seems to have declined rapidly from the mid-19th century; no work of any significance is associated with it after that period".

The late style of Pandit Seu, adopted after him by his sons, "is variously described as ‘Guler’ (Archer) and ‘pre-Kangra’ by Karl Khandalavala, and M. S. Randhawa spoke of Guler as the ‘birthplace of Kangra art’; however, it is perhaps best spoken of as the Seu–Nainsukh family style". Despite all their innovations, works of Pandit Seu and Manaku evolved from earlier Basohli traditions. By contrast, mature style of Nainsukh reveal nothing of Basohli school. He spent most of his career in the service of Balwant Singh of Jasrota (1724–1763) and in his paintings he gave an intimate portrait of his day-to-day life, using his "exceptional gifts of observation and his great skill at drawing to create an intensely, sympathetically observed world that seems still to breathe". According to Goswamy and Fischer Nainsukh's most successful artistic innovation was "his application of Mughal naturalism to details, which imparted to his work an immediacy that was unknown till then in Pahari painting"., but his treatment of space was equally original. His portraits are organized around broad architectural areas in a manner of painting from Muhammad Shah era and Nainsukh is very conscious of the need to set his naturalistic figures in a realistic spatial setting. In paintings from Rasamanjari series by Kripal family architecture was simply a setting to coordinate the colors and shapes that might best heighten the mood of the situation. Nainsukh place his subjects in a specific buildings, constructing highly informative scenes (see illustration of Raja Balwant Singh of Jasrota examining a painting with Nainsukh). It was also Nainsukh who seems to have invented the typical Pahari landscape of a green sward dotted with trees receding to gently rounded hills and a blue sky above.

Nainsukh had four sons and Manaku two, all of them painters. Sons or grandsons of Manaku and Nainsukh were eventually employed at Basohli, Chamba, Guler, Jammu and Kangra, and many additional hill states. Each of the painters had been trained initially in a common family style, derived mainly from the works of Nainsukh, "for even Manaku eventually adopted his brother's manner. This family style, therefore, spread throughout the hills, and there is no other comparably influential painter family known in either the pahari area or Rajasthan". Among the most beautiful of all Indian paintings are those from the three great manuscripts of the Gita Govinda, Bhagavata Purana and Ramayana produced by sons of Manaku and Nainsukh (they are collectively known as "First generation after Manaku and Nainsukh.") In contrast to earlier Pahari paintings "now the characters in the drama are fully integrated into the landscape or architecture of their surroundings and indeed these hitherto background effects begin to take on an expressive life of their own, complementing or commenting on the action. The architectural surrounds act not as backdrops but as fully integrated parts of the story within which the drama is played out, allowing greater complexity of composition". (see illustration of Wedding of Krishna's Parents)

These works lead directly into the Kangra style as patronized by Sansar Chand (r. 1775–1823) and it is possible that they were commissioned to mark his marriage in 1780–1781 to a princess of Suket. The grandsons of Manaku and Nainsukh ("second generation") "continue the family tradition of painting such works whether for Kangra patrons or elsewhere. The texts illustrated by their fathers are done again in slightly drier styles, while others such as the Devimahatmya and various Shaiva texts were added to the repertoire. Despite their familiarity with the earlier compositions, there is no loss of vivid imagination". Although competent work continued to be done by later descendants of Pandit Seu until the end of the century, "the freshness went out of the style, which often lapsed into sentimentality and dull repetition".

Kangra style, which has its origin in painting of Seu-Nainsukh family, dominate entire landscape of Pahari painting, with only few exceptions. In Mandi under Shamsher Sen (r. 1727–1781) traditional elements of Rajput painting, like flat planes of color and disproportion between figures, becomes more exposed. There was also little attention to spatial representation and modeling was restricted to heavy shading. But the most important artist at the court of Ishwari Sen (r. 1788–1826), Sajnu, was a painter from Guler who worked generally in the style of the "second generation". Another important painter outside the Seu-Nainsukh family who worked in the Kangra style was Purkhu (fl c. 1790–1820), the chief portraitist of Sansar Chand. With the Sikh invasion of Kangra in 1812, many Pahari artists migrated to the court of Ranjit Singh (r. 1801–1839) where they were instrumental in forming a distinctive Sikh style of painting.

=== Garhwal ===
The beginning of painting in Garhwal, located to the extreme south-east of the Punjab Hills, is associated with a person of Mola Ram (c. 1750–1833). Poet and painter, he claimed to be a descendant of one of the two Mughal painters who come to Srinagar in 1658 (no work by these artists has survived). Mola Ram himself worked in Mughal and later "rather stiff and clumsy version of the Kangra style". Among Garhwal's finest paintings is a group of works from the second half of the 18th century, including Shiva watches Parvati Sleep in Museum of Fine Arts, Boston (see illustration). Many scholars have attributed these to outside artists whose presence in Garhwal is confirmed by Mola Ram. This and some stylistic affinities between Garhwal and Guler painting "suggest that Guler painters settled in Garhwal. Opinion, however, is divided; scholars have suggested alternatively that artist from Pahari centres other than Guler migrated to Garhwal, that Garhwal painters travelled to other Pahari centres for apprenticeship or that Garhwal style was developed independently by local artists".

Yet despite all influences of Guler and other centres of Pahari painting Garhwal works have their own distinct individuality. For example, landscape contain elements of the local environment, like large tree with leafless branches. Women are rendered with sinuous graceful figures, sharp facial features and slender wrists and fingers. The use of Shaivite crescent-shaped marks on foreheads was a common and consistent feature at Garhwal. The master who created the poetical Garhwal works of the period 1765-1790 have no familial links to the descendants of Pandit Seu

Srinagar was severely damaged by an earthquake in 1802, and Garhwal was occupied by the Gurkhas of Nepal the following year. They remained in power until 1815, when they were driven out by the British, who annexed the southern part of the state. When Sudarshan Shah (r. 1815–59), moved in 1816 to the new capital, Tehri, artists again assembled there. The basic traits of Garhwal are present in their works, but the sophistication of the compositions and panoramic landscapes of earlier paintings is greatly simplified. With a few exceptions, the work shows a gradual decline. Excellent works were produced, however, by the painter Chetu (Chaitu; fl c. 1830–c. 1860) and other artists from Guler/Kangra who worked for the Tehri–Garhwal court during this period. Their works "are characterized by fluid female figures, but instead of the luxuriant landscapes for which Garhwal painting is famous, sparse compositions with blob-like trees are typical." Later painting activity in Garhwal concentrated on "crude versions of old paintings" and "no new style had developed".

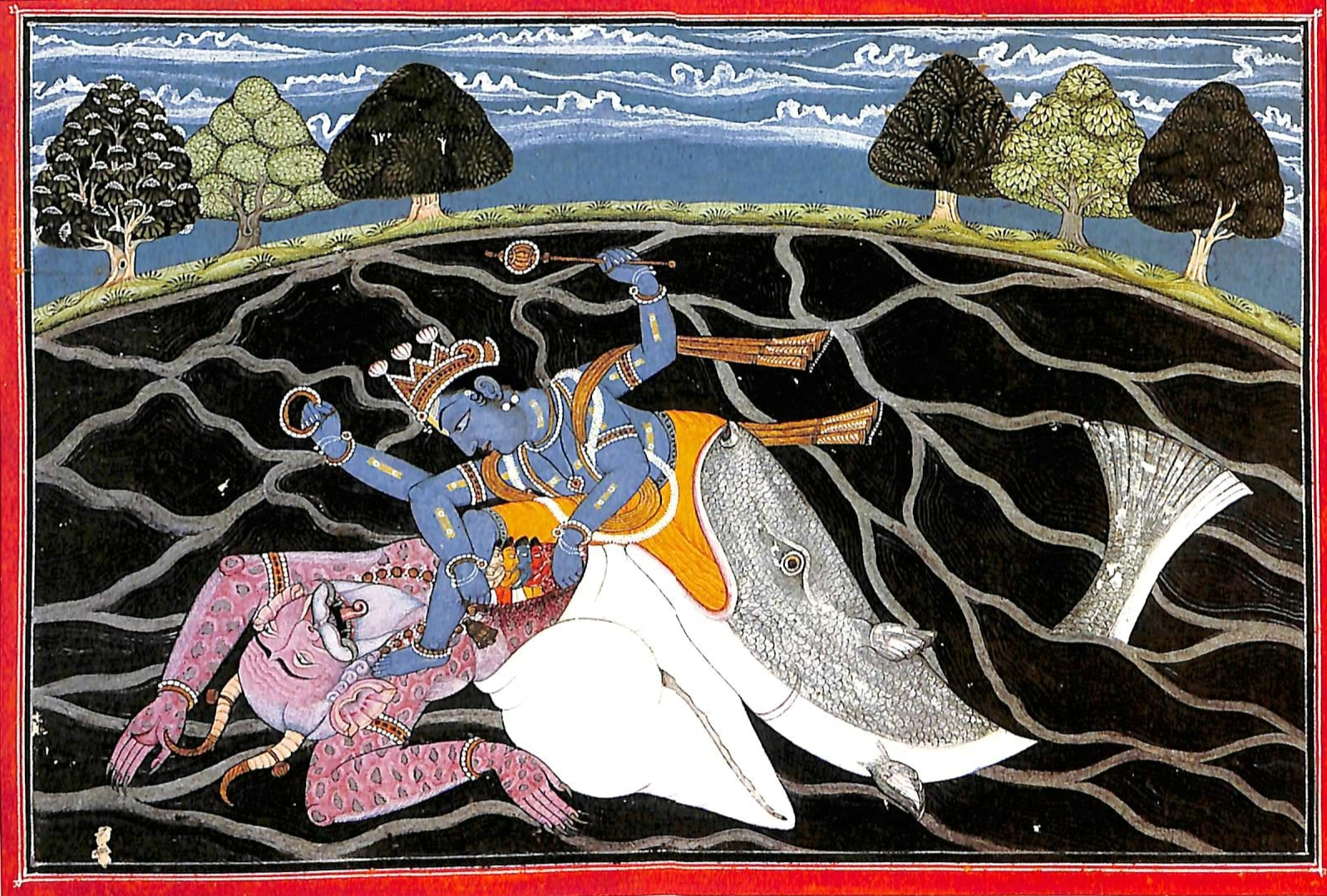
Matsya, the Fish-Incarnation of Vishnu, Folio from a Dashavatara series ascribed to Mahesh of Chamba. Chamba, c. 1725–1750. Bhuri Singh Museum.

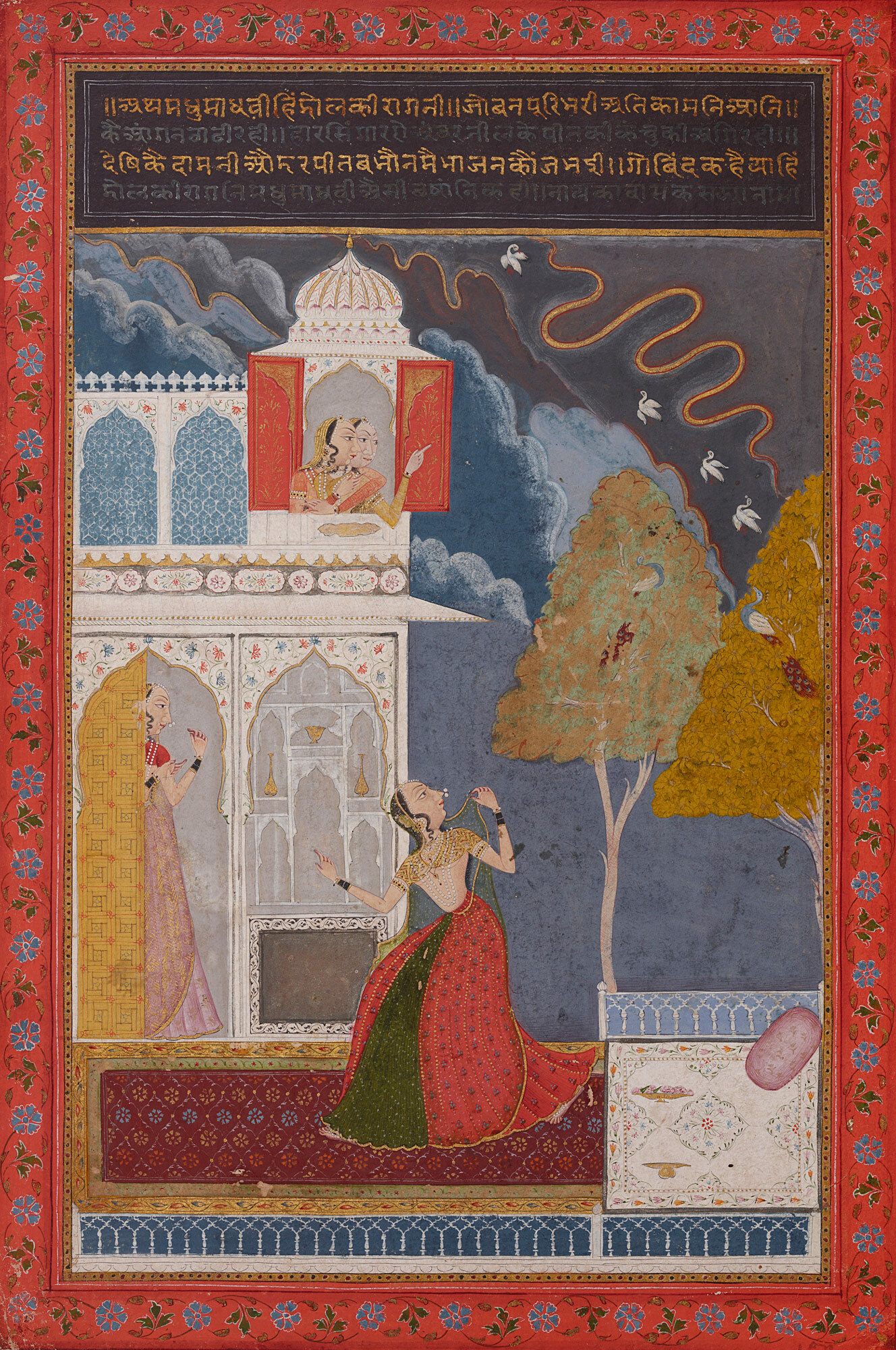
Ragini Madhumadhavi, by Jay Krishna. Malpura, c. 1756. Rietberg Museum.

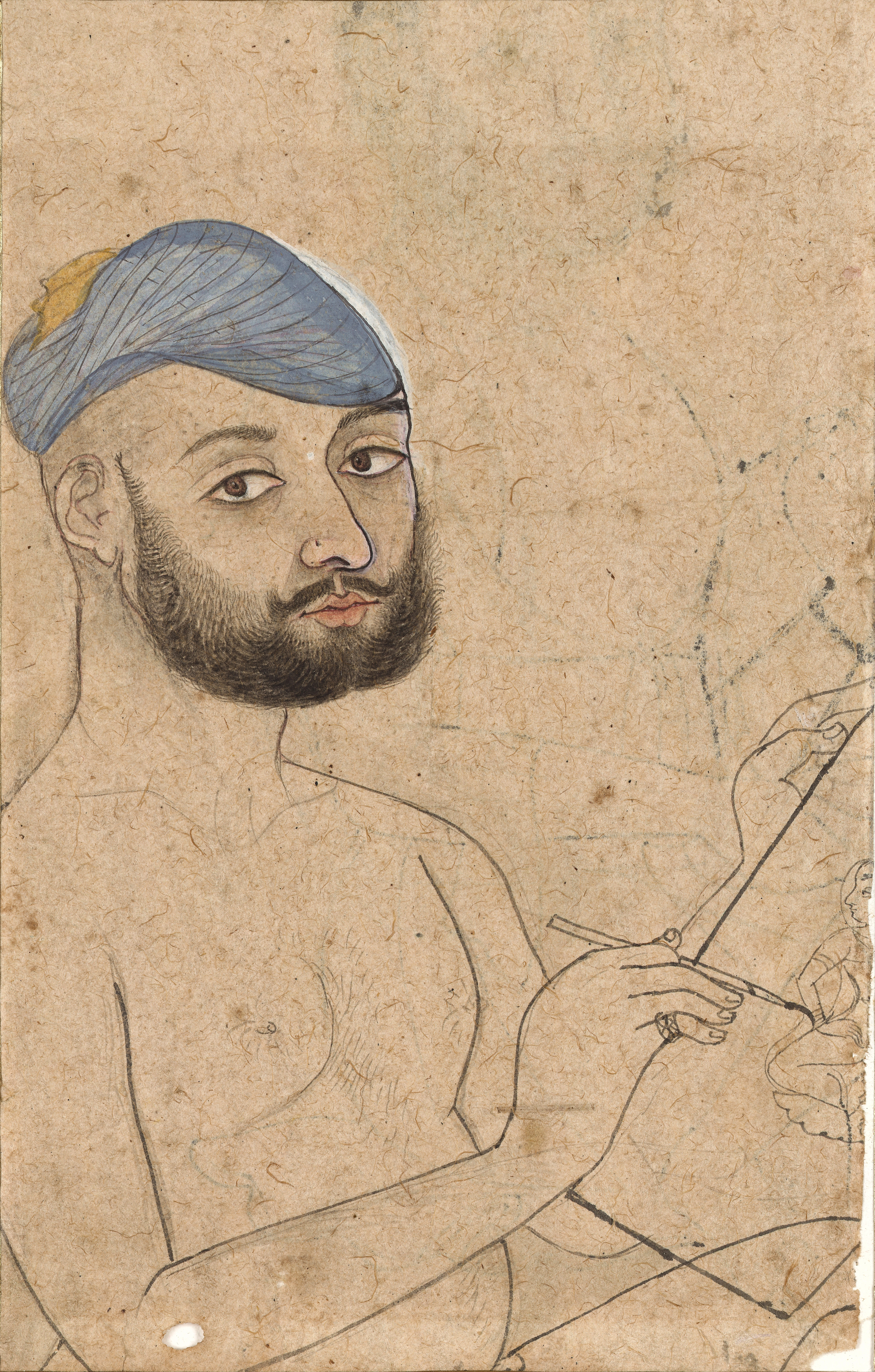
Artist at work. Bikaner, c. 1780–1790. National Museum, New Delhi.

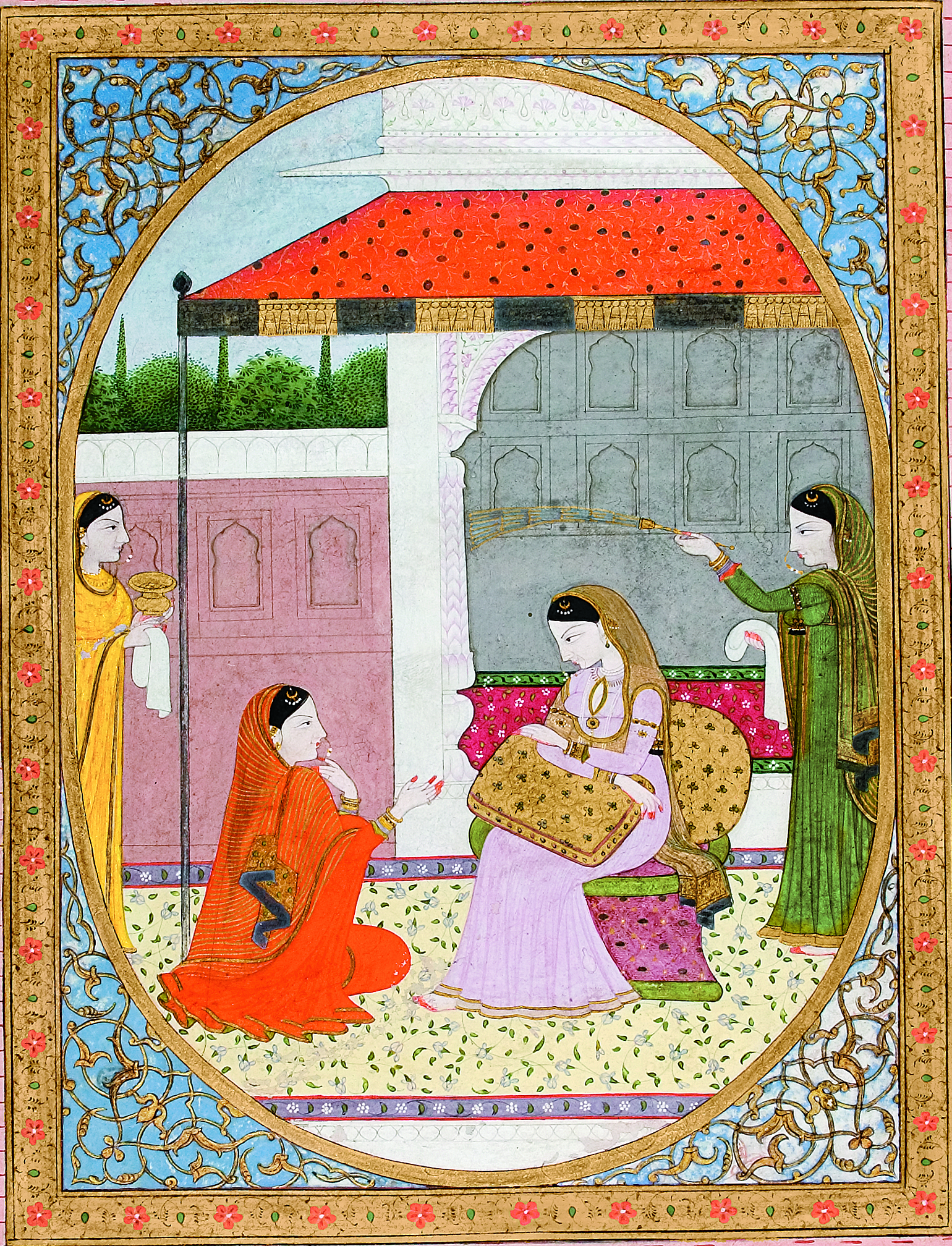
A pensive nayika with her sakhi by Sajnu of Mandi, Folio from a Rasikapriya series. Mandi, c. 1820. San Diego Museum of Art.

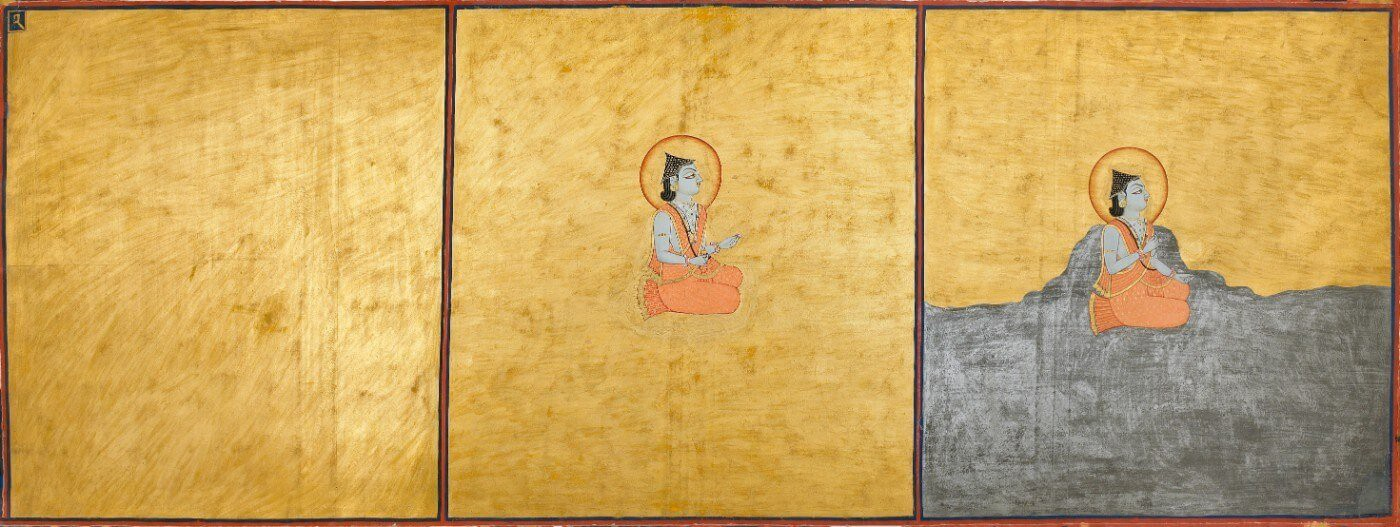
Three Aspects of The Absolute, miniature by Bulaki from the manuscript of Shri Nath Charit, definitive text of the Nath yogis. Jodhpur, 1823. Mehrangarh Museum Trust.

== End of Rajput painting ==
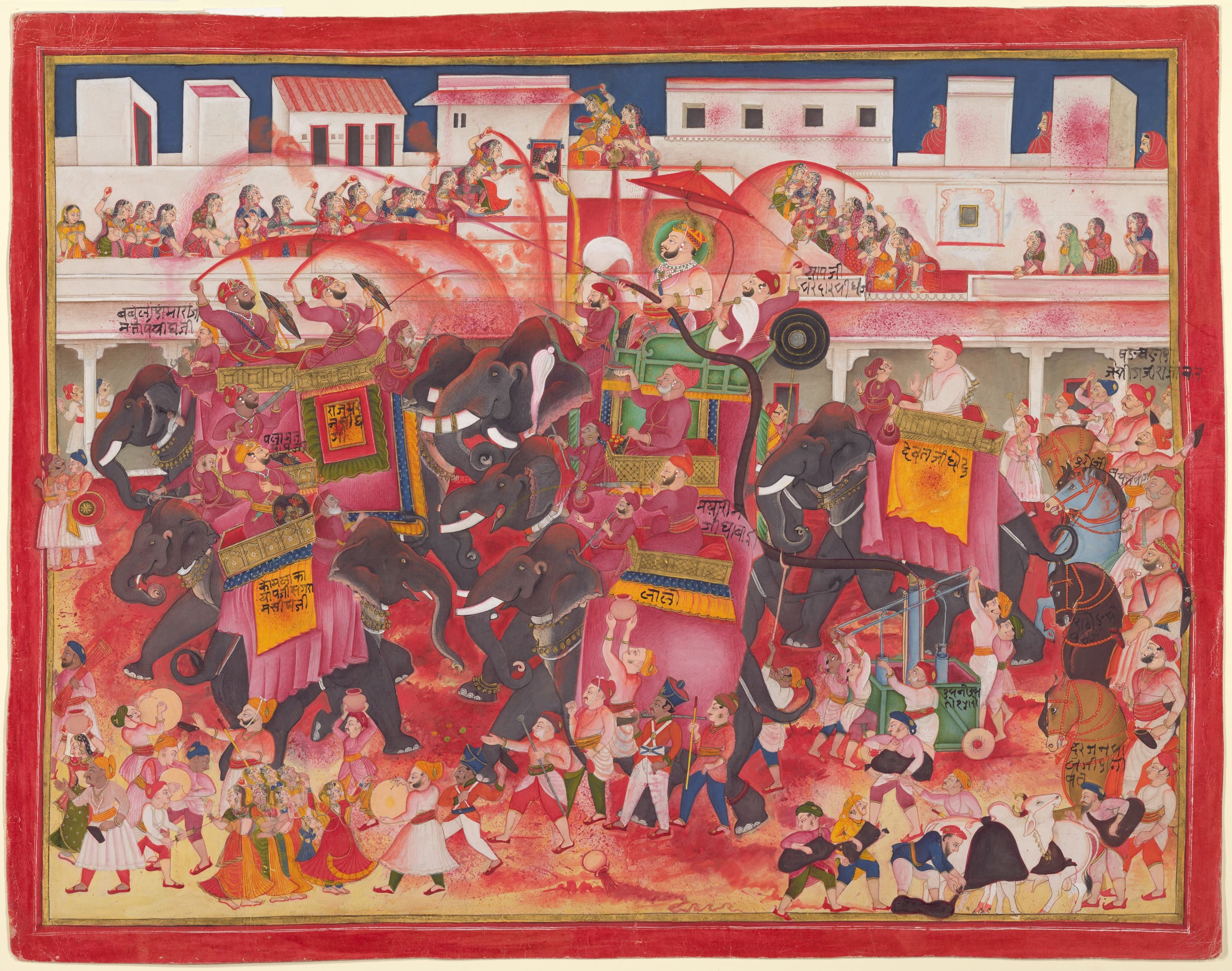
Maharao Ram Singh II of Kotah and companions playing Holi on elephants in a street by Kisan Das (fl c. 1840–1850). This painting can be seen as celebration of modernity, because Kisan Das documented here the king directing the new palace fire engine's hose towards townswomen peeping at him from their balconies, drenching the ladies in redtinted water for Holi. At the same time solid and strong colors, flat patterns with no discernible cloth texture and lack of three-dimensionality suggest return to the pre-Mughal style of painting. Kota, 1844. National Gallery of Victoria.

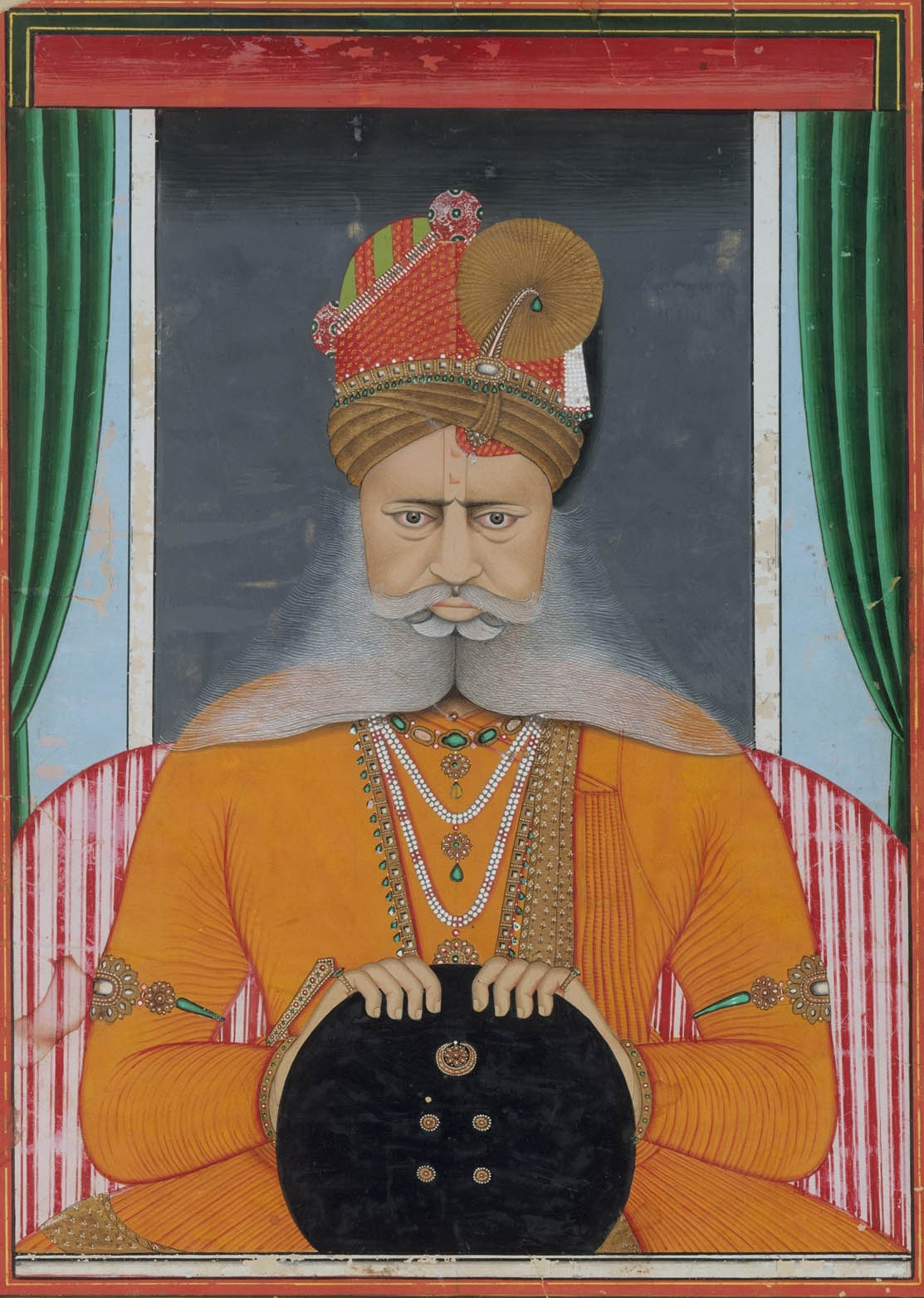
Maharaja Sardar Singh of Bikaner by Chotu (fl c. 1870–1886). This painting is a clear example of the influence of photography on royal portratuire in this period. At first glance, the work seems one of almost photographic realism. However, Chotu has carefully manipulated the painting's elements to play two and three-dimensional forms against one another. From the knobs on the maharaja's shield to the fold in his turban, almost every element in painting is arranged symmetrically around the central axis. Explicitly rooting the sovereign's power in the divine, painter also channeled the central axis through Vaishnavite tilka and transposed the halo, which had long signified divinity, onto a precisely constructed, perfectly symmetrical frontality. In effect "the maharaja meets the viewer's gaze in full darshan, the ritual gaze Hindu devotees exchange with deities in worship". Bikaner, c. 1870. Metropolitan Museum of Art.

By the 18th century, Rajput schools seemed to be the last bastion of traditional Indian painting due to the influence of other styles introduced by European naturalism and later by British patronage. In 19th century, Rajput rulers continued to commission sets of paintings illustrating the Hindu epics and religious love poetry, as well as their court life, but with the already mentioned invasions of the Sikhs, Gurkhas, and ultimately British, patronage declined. End or diminished existence of Rajput state also meant an end or diminished existence of its art. Somewhere, like in Mewar or Kota, there were still sizeable royal ateliers, but European influence become continuously stronger, with increased use of acerbic imported pigments and the growing impact of the photographic image.

Some rulers of the Rajput states keep British administrators at arm's length and remained interested in traditional painting. Therefore, the 19th century "was full of vibrant art that borrowed from European visual vocabulary without being submerged by it". Smaller kingdoms could not always afford to retain artists, thus group of painters from active artistic centres like Udaipur, Jaipur or Nathdwara travelled to fill the orders of sovereigns and wealthy individuals. Nathdwara was a specific place where artistic activity concentrated not around ruler's court, but Shrinathji Temple. Period of peace under British rule proved favorable for its large group of artists, who benefited from increasing number of pilgrims. Ghasiram Sharma (1869–1932) "brought the devotional vision of the Nathadwara school into the 20th century, and gave it pan-Indian popularity through the new medium of color lithography".(see illustration of The head priest (Tilakayat) Govardhanlalji makes offerings to Shri Nathji in celebration of the flower festival (phulasajya) or Spring festival (Gulabi Gangaur))

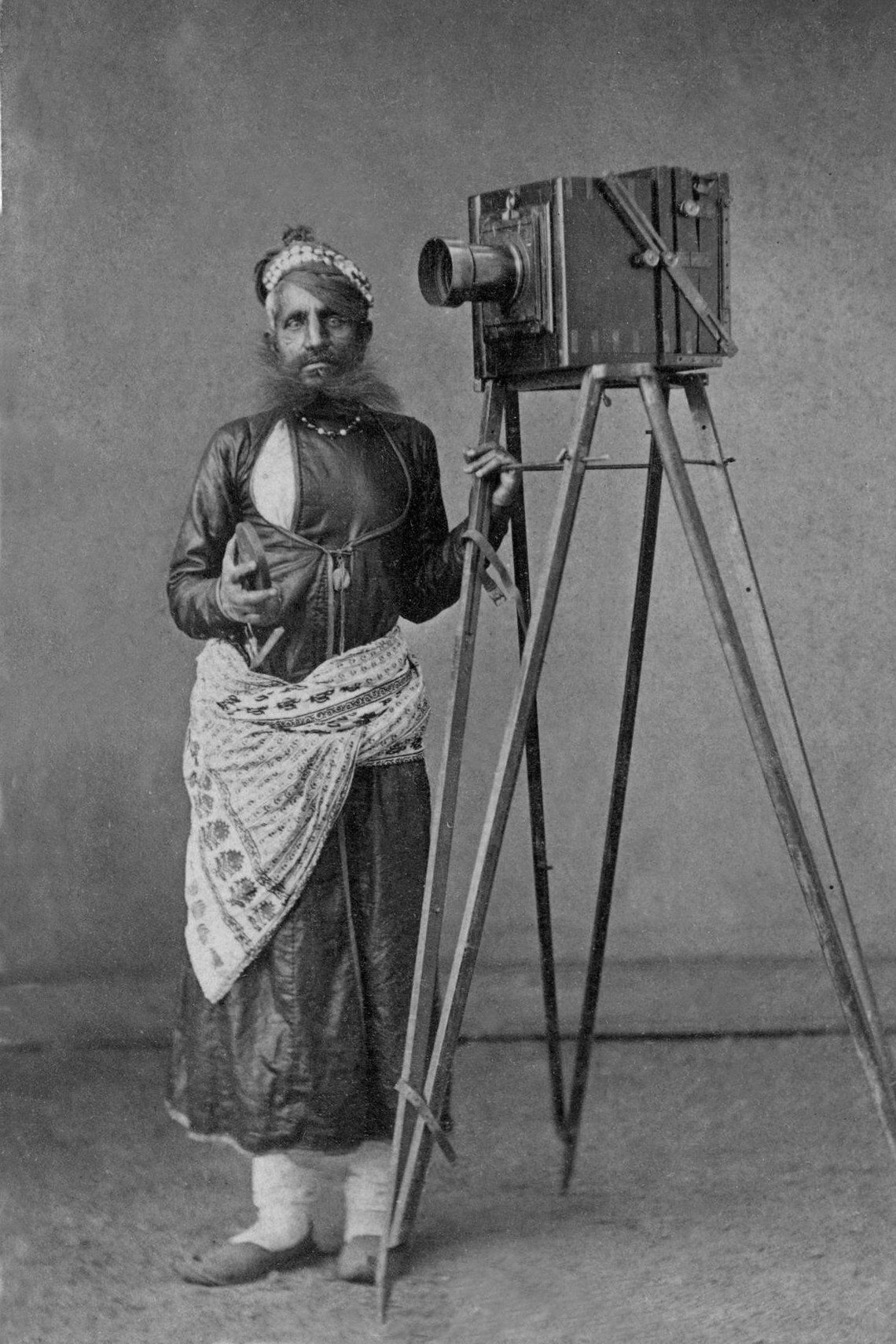
Portrait of Mohanlal with His Camera. Udaipur, c. 1875. The City Palace Museum, Udaipur.

At the same time painting was often replaced by photography. An enthusiastic early practitioner of the new craft, Ram Singh II (r. 1833–1880), took the likenesses of visitors, documented events in his capital and composed photographs of a more personal nature. The categories into which these images may be filed do not differ so much from the conventional genres of courtly reportage painting. In fact "at many regional kingdoms the court artist's place was gradually usurped by a royal photographer. In Mewar, where Shivalal dominated court painting from the late 1860s until the early 1890s, evidence suggests that his younger brother Mohanlal countered by taking up photography [...] Mohanlal's son Liladhar served Shambhu Singh's successors, wielding both brush and camera, while a grandson later advanced to the post of official photographer and cinematographer [...]. The general pattern was repeated at other painting centers". One of the offshoots of Indian photography was the painted photo-portrait. It originated from Western tinted photographs and "these hybrid productions are sometimes wildly expressive, while in other cases careful overpainting in gouache (or even oil) entirely obscures the original print". (see illustration of Portrait of Jaswant Singh II of Jodhpur) Rise of a photography also means that many artists began working from camera-studies and their paintings incorporated aesthetic of the new medium.

In his book Mughal and Rajput Painting Milo C. Beach presented very static vision of Rajput painting. According to him, "after periods of novelty and change, Rajput artists inevitably returned to reaffirm the importance of those important qualities from which they had earlier departed. This is in strong contrast to evolution of Mughal styles, in which - at least between 1550 and 1650 - there was continual change and a probing progression in the understanding of the subjects portrayed. In Mughal art, stylistic phases, once abandoned, did not again come into fashion". It should be no surprise, therefore, that Mughal painting has been so extensively studied by Western scholars, interested mainly in change of styles. Rajput art used novel visual ideas "for opposite purposes: to explore and extend the expressive possibilities of established and unquestioned pictorial values. Rajput painters continually confirmed the richness and universality of inherited artistic styles" and this profoundly Indian attitude was eventually accepted even by the Mughal painters, who, as was already said, at the end of Jahangir reign started to emphasize the universal and to diminish individual aspect of things.

In some contrast to his opinion, different than Beach authors see some permanent and important changes in Rajput painting. Already quoted here Losty thought that in the 18th century, the general trend throughout Rajput painting was a growing interest in spatial realization, even if not achieved through linear perspective, consequent on a movement of artists from Delhi to Rajput courts. The most dramatic evolution happened in Pahari painting, which become entirely dominated by the new Kangra style, developed by Seu-Nainsukh family. That's the reason why Steven Kossak wrote that history of painting from the Punjab hills "can be roughly split into two phases, the first from about 1660 to the 1740s and the second from the 1740s to 1800". Kangra artists from this second phase created the magic world where, to use the words of Coomaraswamy "all men are heroic, and all women beautiful and passionate and shy". But this means that also for them universal was more important than individual, like for other Indian artists.

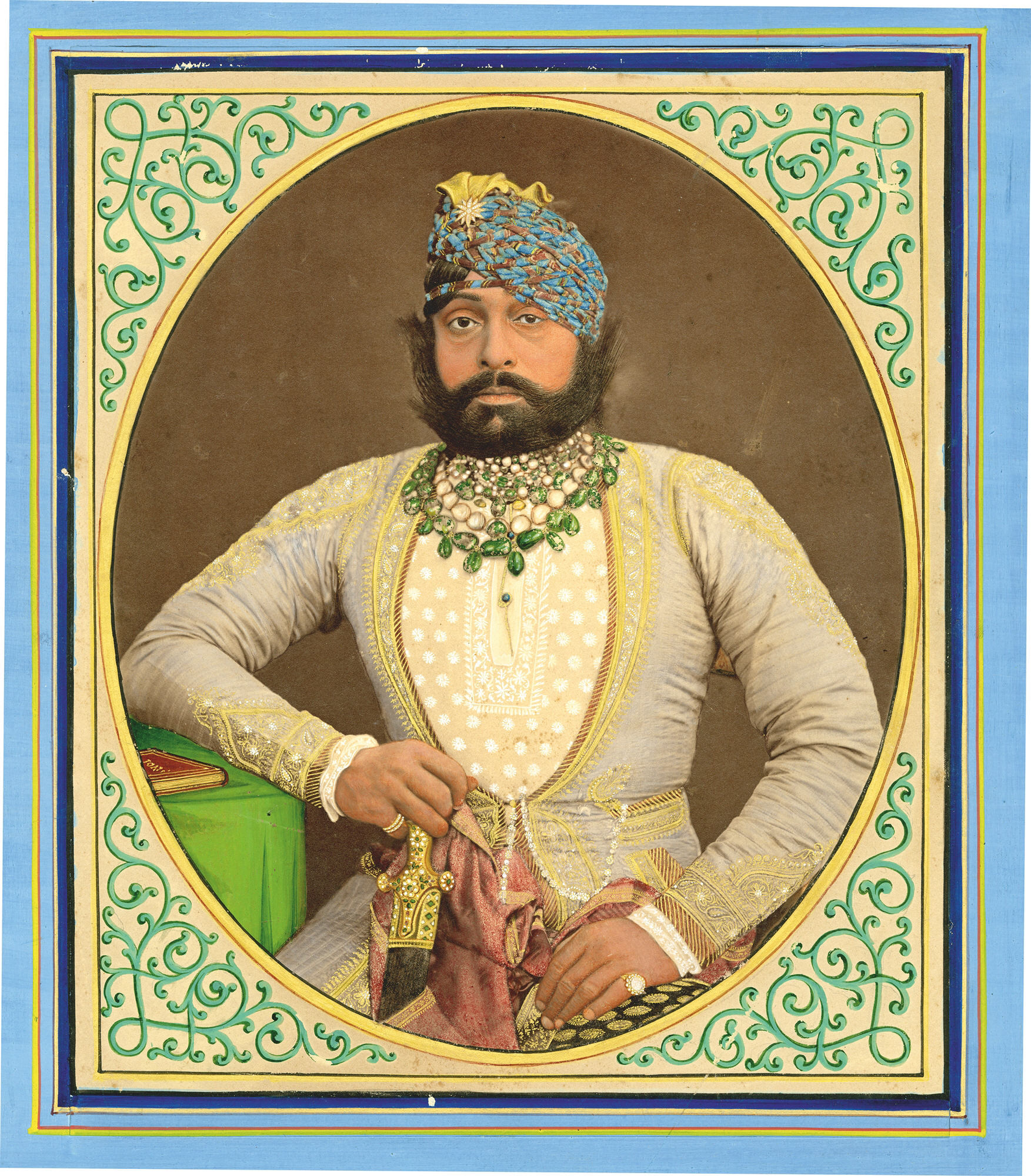
Portrait of Jaswant Singh II of Jodhpur. Photographer unknown, overpainted by Shivalal, c. 1875. The City Palace Museum, Udaipur.

The head priest (Tilakayat) Govardhanlalji makes offerings to Shri Nathji in celebration of the flower festival (phulasajya) or Spring festival (Gulabi Gangaur) by Ghasiram Sharma. Nathdwara, c. 1890. Cleveland Museum of Art.

== Bibliography ==
- Aitken, Molly Emma (2017). "Colonial-Period Court Painting and the Case of Bikaner". Archives of Asian Art. 67 (1): 25–59. doi:10.1215/00666637-3788636. JSTOR 26585438. S2CID 194716019.
- Beach, Milo Cleveland (1992). Mughal and Rajput Painting (The New Cambridge History of India). Cambridge University Press. ISBN 0-521-40027-9.
- Beach, Milo Cleveland (2008). "Wall-Paintings at Bundi: Comments and a New Discovery". Artibus Asiae. 68 (1): 101–127, 129–143. doi:10.61342/VBNQ2311. JSTOR 25261889.
- Beach, Milo Cleveland; Fischer, Eberhard; Goswamy, B.N., eds. (2011). Masters of Indian Painting. Volume I and II. Artibus Asiae Publishers. ISBN 978-93-83098-68-2.
- Goswamy, B. N. (2016). The Spirit of Indian Painting. Close Encounters with 101 Great Works. 1100-1900. Thames & Hudson. ISBN 978-0-500-23950-6.
- B.N. Goswamy; Eberhard Fischer (art historian) (1992). Pahari Masters: Court Painters of Northern India. Artibus Asiae Publishers. ISBN 3-907070-37-2.
- Losty, J. P. (2003). "Indian subcontinent". Grove Art Online. doi:10.1093/gao/9781884446054.article.T040113. ISBN 978-1-884446-05-4.
- McInerney, Terence; Kossak, Steven M.; Haidar, Navina Najat, eds. (2016). Divine Pleasures. Painting from India's Rajput Courts. Metropolitan Museum of Art. ISBN 978-1-58839-590-0.
- Topsfield, Andrew (2002). Court painting at Udaipur: art under the patronage of the Maharanas of Mewar. Artibus Asiae Publishers. ISBN 3-907077-03-2.
