= Vikas (disambiguation) =

Vikas is a given name (see article for a list of people with the name).

Vikas may also refer to:

== Education ==
- Grama Vikas Kendra, extension centre of the Mahatma Gandhi University
- Netraheen Vikas Sansthan, residential school for the blind in Jodhpur, Rajasthan, India
- Rajkiya Pratibha Vikas Vidyalaya, system of schools in Delhi, India
- Vidhyaa Vikas Educational Institutions, group of educational institutions located in Tiruchengode, Tamil Nadu
- Vidya Vikas Institute of Engineering & Technology (VVIET), Engineering college in Mysore
- Vikas Vidyalaya, boarding school in Kolkata, India

== Political ==
- Bahujan Vikas Aaghadi, political party in Maharashtra
- Bharat Vikas Morcha, political party in Bihar
- Bharatiya Manavata Vikas Party, political party in India
- Bihar Vikas Party, political party in Bihar
- Chhattisgarh Vikas Party, former political party
- Haryana Vikas Party, former political party in Haryana
- Himachal Vikas Congress, former political party in Himachal Pradesh
- Jharkhand Vikas Morcha (Prajatantrik), political party in India
- Karnataka Vikas Party, a political party in Karnataka
- Kisan Vikas Party, political party in Bihar
- Maharashtra Vikas Party, political party in Maharashtra
- Manu Bhandari v. Kala Vikas Motion Pictures Ltd, landmark case in the area of Indian copyright law
- Purvanchal Vikas Party, political party founded ahead of the 2004 Lok Sabha election in the India
- Rajasthan Vikas Party, a political party in Rajasthan
- Sampurna Vikas Dal, political party in Bihar
- Shahar Vikas Aghadi, several local political parties in Greater India
- Vidarbha Vikas Party, political party in Maharashtra

== Others ==
- Andhra Pradesh Grameena Vikas Bank, regional rural bank
- Gram Vikas, NGO in Odisha
- Gujarat Urja Vikas Nigam, electrical services umbrella company in the state of Gujarat
- Kisan Vikas Patra, saving certificate scheme
- Mumbai Railway Vikas Corporation, subsidiary of the Indian Railways
- Rail Vikas Nigam Limited, builder of engineering works required by Indian Railways
- Rajiv Gandhi Mahila Vikas Pariyojana, NGO for women
- Rashtriya Krishi Vikas Yojana, State Plan Scheme for agriculture in India
- Sabka Saath, Sabka Vikas, Government of India policy for inclusive development
- Vikas Nagar, village in the Nicobar district of Andaman and Nicobar Islands
- Vikas Publishing, an Indian publishing company based in Delhi
- Vikas (rocket engine), a liquid-fueled rocket engine made by India

== See also ==
- Vika (disambiguation)
- Bikas (disambiguation)
