= Gram Vikas Residential School =

Gram Vikas Residential Schools
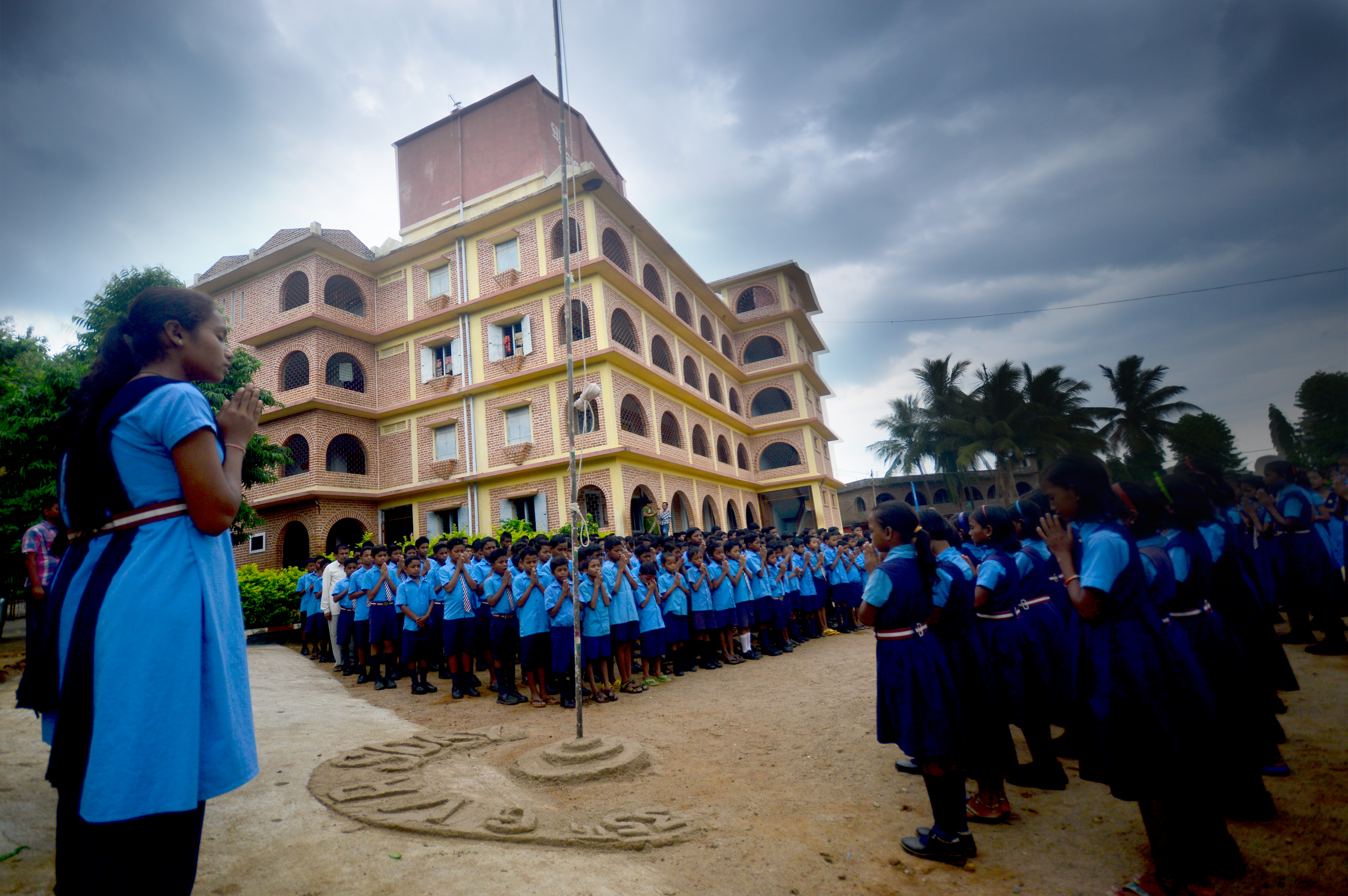
- Students in morning prayer at Gram Vikas Residential School, Kankia

Location
- Odisha; India; 19.244498°N 84.701431°E

Information
- Type: Private boarding school
- Established: 1982
- Founder: Joe Madiath
- Faculty: 50
- Gender: Co-educational
- Age range: 8–17
- Enrollment: 1500
- Affiliation: Board of Secondary Education, Odisha (BSE Odisha)
- Website: www.gramvikas.org www.gvrs.org.in

Gram Vikas Residential School is a co-educational Odia medium school that offers education from Grade 3 to Grade 10 level in Odisha, India. The school was founded in 1982 by Dr. Joe Madiath. It is affiliated to the Board of Secondary Education, Odisha. It has four branches. Gram Vikas High School was established in 1982 at Kankia village in the Ganjam district. Mahendra Tanaya Ashram School was established in Koinpur village in Gajapati District of Odisha in 1992. Two more schools, Gram Vikas Shiksa Niketan and Gram Vikas Vidya Vihar, were established in 1998 and 2002 in Kalahandi district and Ganjam district, respectively.

== History ==
=== Origins ===
In 1971, Joe Madiath led 400 volunteers from the University of Madras' Young Students' Movement for Development to West Bengal to manage relief camps for refugees of the Bangladesh Liberation War. Witnessing the devastation of the 1971 Odisha cyclone, and realising the comparatively little attention received by the disaster victims, Madiath and a small group of 40 volunteers shifted their attention there.

The group decided that the best way to help the cyclone victims was to provide irrigation facilities. Once these efforts were completed, the group handed over the facilities to the villagers and left. But Madiath and a small group of YSMD volunteers came to the realisation that the irrigation facilities benefited mostly the landlords, and decided to stay in Orissa to become social activists.

Joe Madiath and remaining volunteers moved to Ganjam district at the invitation of the local authorities, and established Gram Vikas in 1979 and Gram Vikas Resdeintial School Kankia in 1982.

== Campuses ==
The campuses of the school are spread over 3 districts of Odisha. The campuses include:

- Gram Vikas High School Campus, Kankia
- Mahendra Tanaya Ashram Campus, Koinpur
- Gram Vikas Shiksha Niketan Campus, Th. Rampur
- Gram Vikas Vidya Vihar Campur, Rudhapadar

== Gram Vikas Residential School, Kankia ==
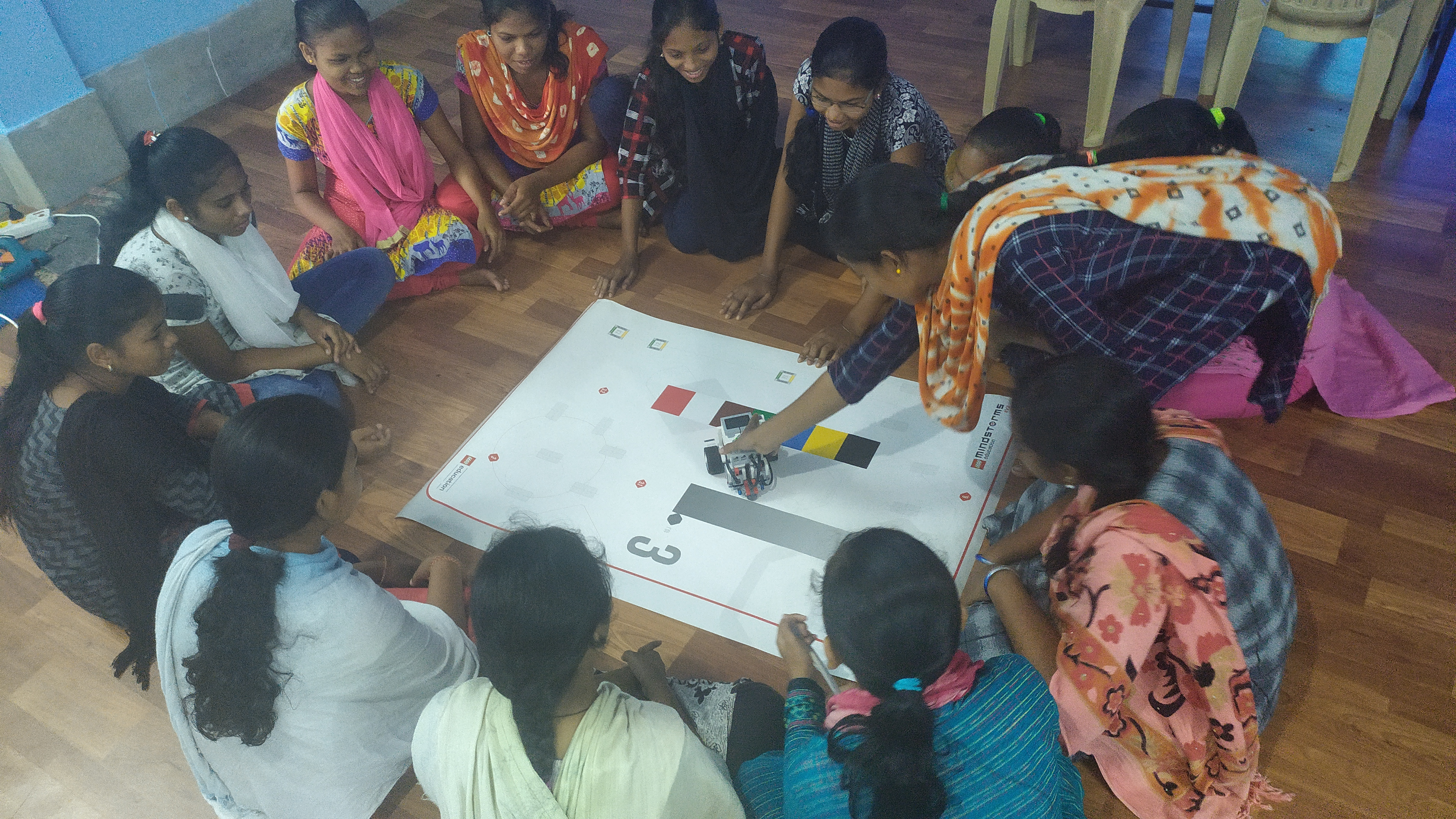
Robotics Workshop in Atal Tinkering Lab

Students at Gram Vikas Residential School, Kankia, are encouraged to be self-reliant and participate in various daily activities of the school campus.

The school collaborated with 'Pro sports Development' organization to bring about holistic development of kids in physical education. In Rajiv Gandhi Khel Abhiyan- 2014, students won 14 gold medals and 2 silver medals in various sports at district level. In weightlifting competition, 9 out of 15 participants won gold medals.

The school has an active Atal Tinkering Lab funded by NITI Aayog under Atal Innovation Mission.It was inaugurated by Honourable Speaker of Odisha Dr. Surjya Narayan Patro. The students of the school make various science models and innovative prototypes along with working with sensors and robots.

The American School in Switzerland (TASIS) visits Gram Vikas every year with a group of students.

Establishment: 2 July 1982 Classes: From Class 3 to Class 10. Students: 504 Teachers: 23 Address: Kankia Village, Ganjam District, Odisha – 761008

== Mahendra Tanaya Ashram School, Koinpur ==
Mahendra Tanaya Ashram School is located in Koinpur Village in Gajapati district of Odisha. Koinpur village is 50 km from the nearest town Parlekhemundi. The village and the adjacent villages mostly consisted of Saura tribe with 100% illiteracy rate. To overcome this, Mahendra Tanaya Ashram School was established in 1992. The school is located in Gram Vikas project office. The school operates from class 3 to class 7 in co-educational mode. It caters to the children from the Anandpur, Karadasingh and Koinpur project locations of Gram Vikas. Looking at the need and demand from the community to start education at early age for their kids, one more school, Gatida School, was started on 12 July 2007 with 4 primary classes, from class 1 to class 4 and covers 27 villages in the Gajapati district.

Establishment: 15 August 1992 Classes: From Class 3 to Class 7 Students: 237 Teachers: 12 Address: Koinpur Village, Gajapati District, Odisha – 761212

== Gram Vikas Shiksha Niketan, Kumudabahal ==
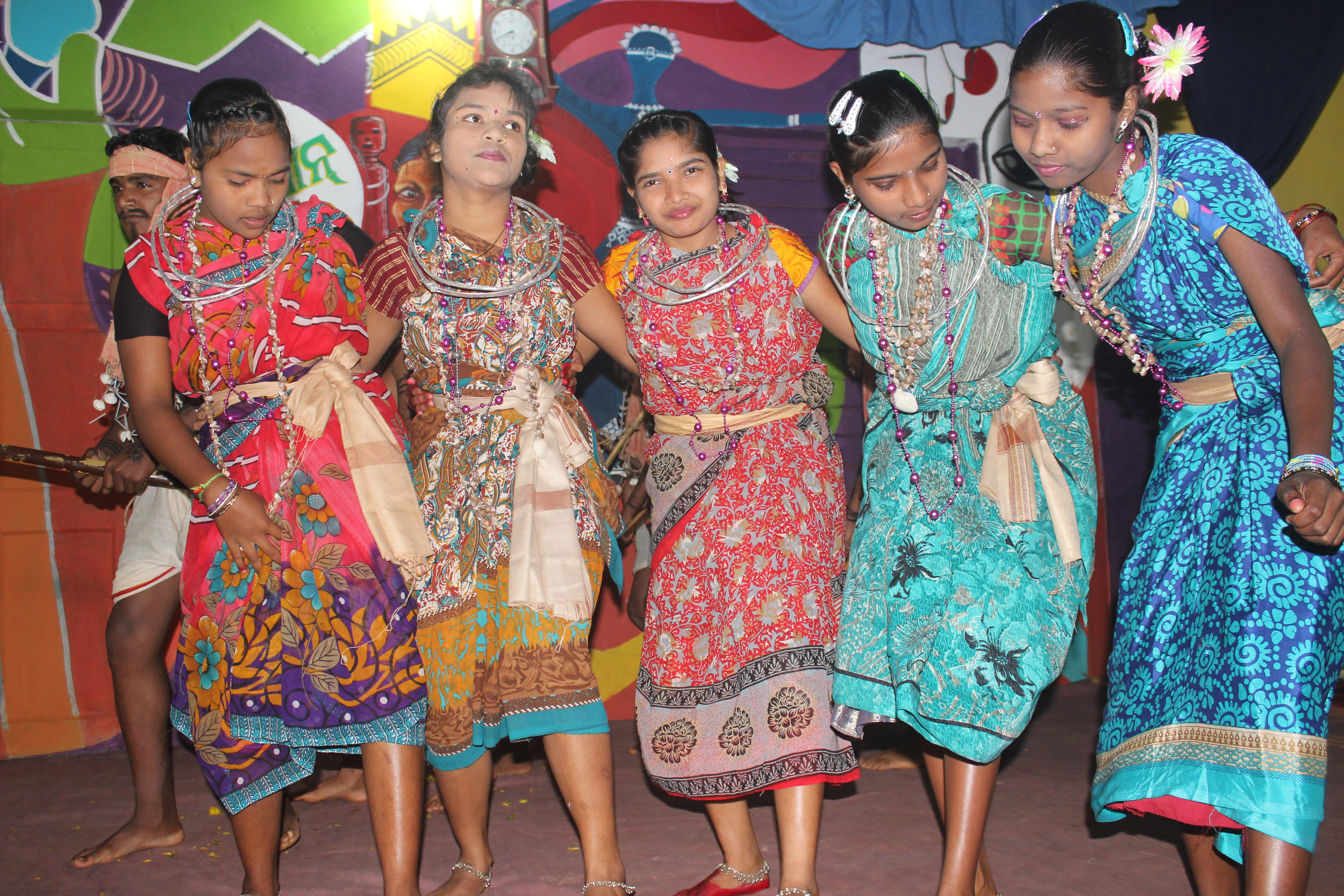
Tribal Dance at Gram Vikas Shiksha Niketan

Gram Vikas started a residential school, Gram Vikas Shikshya Niketan School, at Kumudabahal in Thuamul Rampur block of Kalahandi district. It is located 62 kilometers from the District headquarters, Bhawanipatna. Gram Vikas Sikshya Niketan School was established on 15th Aug 1998. Most of the children are from remote places and, often, extremely backward areas without any road connection and electricity.

Establishment: 15 August 1998 Classes: From Class 3 to Class 8 Students: 330 Teachers: 15 Address: Kumudabahal Village, Th. Rampur, Kalahandi District, Odisha – 766037

== Gram Vikas Vidya Vihar, Rudhapadar ==
Gram Vikas established Gram Vikas Vidya Vihar School on 15 August 2002 at Rudhadapadar Village adjacent to Gram Vikas project office in Jagannath Prasad Block of Ganjam district. This school provides education to children from Tribal and Dalit communities of the area.

The school has an Innovation Lab by the name of Navonmesh Prayogshala (which is the Sanskrit term for Innovation Lab) under which students make science models like water rocket, kaleidoscope, periscope, cup anemometer etc. using local materials. which was established by SBI Fellow Sameer Kumar Misra.

Establishment: 15 July 2002 Classes: From Class 3 to Class 7 Students: 167 Teachers: 9 Address: Gayaganda Village, Ganjam District, Odisha – 761131

== Activities ==
=== Academics ===
- Parikalp is one of the main activities undertaken in these schools. Through this activity, students are given problem statements related to the issues in the school and are asked to brainstorm the solution as well as implement it.
- The schools have created an ecology of student friendly environment. Teachers and volunteers use music, videos and even contextual storytelling to make the students relate to the subject.

=== Sports ===
- Khel Vikas: Implementation of compulsory sports.

=== Digital Literacy ===
- "Interactive Learning through ICT", started in April 2015, was started with the objective of using computer aids for interactive learning. It was funded by Oracle for setting up computer lab. Accordingly, a computer lab has been set-up in all the four Gram Vikas Residential Schools.

=== SBI Youth for India Fellowship ===
- State Bank of India has an active collaboration with Gram Vikas Residential School in the form of SBI Youth for India Fellowship with fellows opting to work with kids in the schools every year.

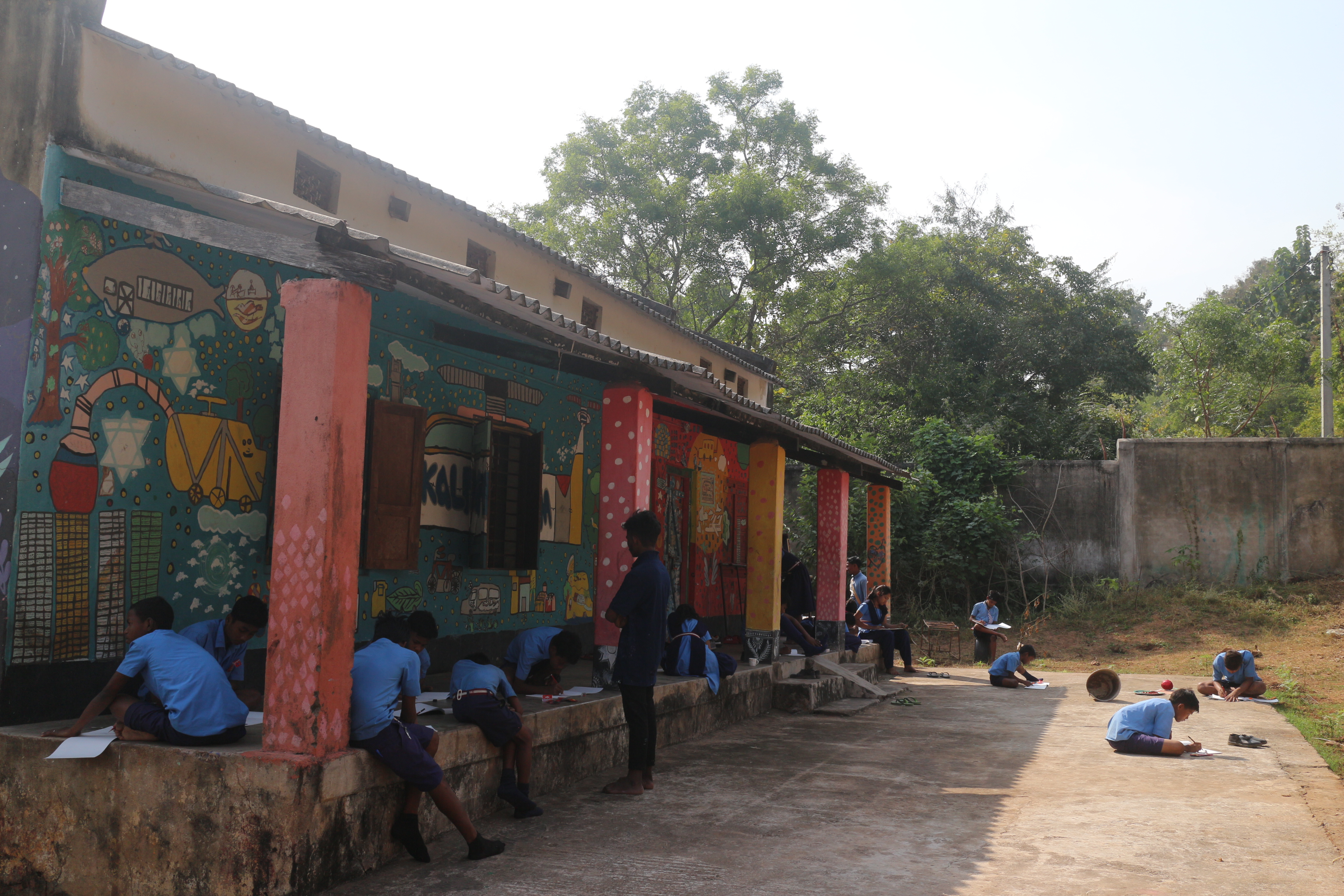
Workshop at Kalpanadham

=== Jagriti Yatra ===
- Jagriti Yatra is an annual affair at the school with over 400 yatris visiting the school every year on New Year eve to interact with Joe and the students.

=== Kalpanadham ===
- A design and creativity studio named Kalpanadham has been set up in all the schools. The curriculum includes both visual arts and performing arts.

== Collaborations ==
The school has an active collaborations with various schools, universities and non-governmental organizations with interns, volunteers, fellows and trainers going on a frequent basis to Gram Vikas Residential Schools. Some of them are

- Azim Premji University
- Azim Premji Foundation Schools
- National Institute of Rural Development and Panchayat Raj
- SELCO
- SBI Foundation
- Pratham Education Foundation
- TASIS

== Awards and recognitions ==
- The school has received "Best school award" continuously for two years in 2018 & 2019 from Odisha state government for academic excellence.
- Gram Vikas High School has been awarded "Best Residential School of the Year Award" by International School Awards [ISA] for the year 2019.
- GVSN is awarded with "Prakruti Bandhu Awards" for the year 2019 by Odisha state government for its work in environmental protection.
- Award for being "Best Sports School" in Ganjam District for excellence in sports' performance by the students at district and state level.
- Winner of DFC – I Can Festival 2018, Two stories from Gram Vikas Vidya Vihar [GVVV] have selected amongst the TOP 20 & 100 Inspiring Stories respectively of the I CAN School Challenge 2018 by Design for Change [DFC]. One was among the top 10.

== In the news ==
- Video Documentary on the School on Youtube by Tennessee Hilderbrand
- A short movie on the Health Promoting School concept of Gram Vikas Residential School
- A snippet on various science education related activities at Gram Vikas Residential School
- India Education Diary covered the story about school's selection For 'Atal Tinkering Lab' by Niti Aayog
- Edexlive covered the story of Kalpanadham on their portal
