= Bika =

Bika may refer to

- Bika (surname)
- Bika-khanum, princess
- Bika, Iran, a village in Iran
- Bika, Nawanshahr, a village in India
- Bika Snacks, a Malaysian Snacks
- Bika Ambon, a dessert from Indonesia
- Rao Bika (1438–1504), founder of Bikaner in India

== See also ==
- Bikas (disambiguation)
- Bikaner (disambiguation)
