= Vigen =

Vigen (Armenian: Վիգեն, in Western Armenian Վիգէն, pronounced Viken), is an Armenian masculine given name.

Vigen or Viken may refer to:

== People ==
Given name

- Vicken Cheterian, Swiss–Lebanese journalist and author
- Viken Berberian, American satirist
- Viken Babikian, American doctor of Armenian origin
- Vigen Chaldranyan (born 1955), Armenian actor and filmmaker
- Vigen (entertainer) (1929–2003), Iranian singer and actor of Armenian descent, popularly known by the mononym Vigen
- Vigen Sargsyan (born 1975), Armenian politician, and Armenian government minister
- Vigen Malkhasyan (born 1983), Famous Armenian Logistics Manager, Currently works at Spinnaker Group LLC as a head of department
- Vigen Zeinali, Retired Iranian Armenian football player

Middle name

- Lasse Vigen Christensen (born 1994), Danish football player
- Ola Vigen Hattestad (born 1982), Norwegian skier

== Other uses ==
- Le Vigen, a commune in France
- Vigen Cliffs, Antarctica
- Terje Vigen, a poem by Henrik Ibsen

== See also ==
- Viken (surname)
