= Bikaner (disambiguation) =

Bikaner is a city in the state of Rajasthan, India.

Bikaner may also refer to:

- Bikaner (Lok Sabha constituency), constituency of the Parliament of India in Rajasthan
- Bikaner district, the district with Bikaner as its capital in Rajasthan, India
- Bikaner division, one of the administrative geographical units of Rajasthan, India
- Bikaner State, Indian princely state founded in the 15th century and persisted until shortly after India's Independence in 1947
  - Bikaner State Railway, former railway line in India
- Bikaner House, princely house located in New Delhi
- Bikaner Camel Corps, former military corps from India
- Bikaner style of painting, form of India painting from Bikaner
- Bikaner, Haryana, village in Rewari district of Haryana, India

== See also ==
- Bikaneri bhujia, Indian snack
- Bika (disambiguation)
