= Vika =

Vika may refer to:

== People ==
- Vika Bull, one of an Australian vocal duo of sisters, Vika and Linda
- Vika Jigulina (born 1986), Romanian musician
- Vika Lusibaea (born 1964), Solomon Islands politician
- Alexander Vika (1933–2025), Slovak sculptor and academic
- Hilda Vīka (1897–1963), Latvian artist and writer
- Ludo Vika (born 1955), Dominican Republic actress

== Places ==
- Vika, Oslo, a neighborhood in the Frogner borough of Oslo, Norway
  - Vika Line, a railway line in Vika, Oslo
- Vika, Troms, a village near Harstad, Norway
- Vika, Sweden, a village in Falun, Sweden
- Vika Court District, or Vika tingslag, former district in Dalecarlia, Sweden
- Vika, the Hungarian name for the village of Vica in Gurasada, Romania

== Other uses ==
- Vikafestivalen, a Norwegian pop music festival
- VIKA, another name for Kanpur Airport in India
- Vika oxygen generator, a life-support system for spaceflight
- The vika, Uromys vika, a rodent unique to the island of Vangunu, Solomon Islands

== See also ==
- Vikas (disambiguation)
- Viken (disambiguation)
