= Joe Madiath =

Indian social entrepreneur (born 1950)

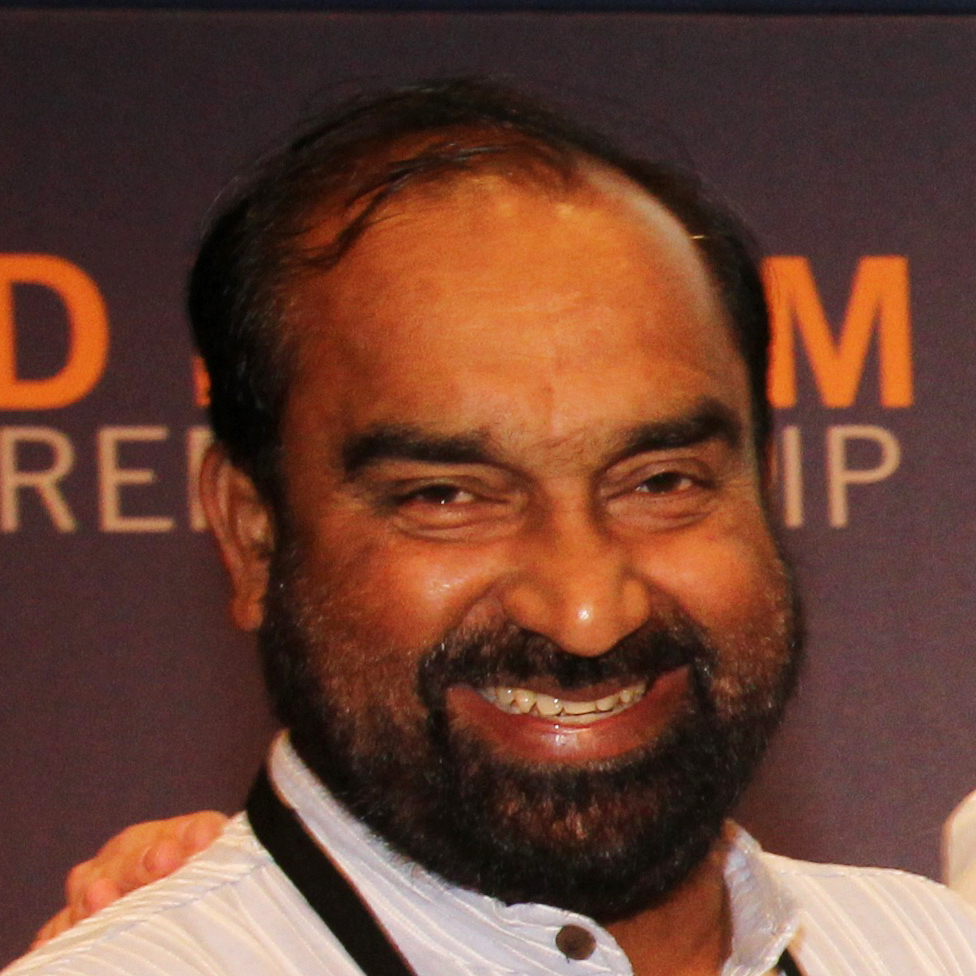
- Madiath at the Skoll World Forum in 2011
- Born: Joseph Madiath; 3 December 1950 (age 75); Cheruvally, Kerala, India
- Occupations: social entrepreneur & founder of Gram Vikas
- Website: GramVikas.org GVRS.org

Joe Madiath is an Indian social entrepreneur. He is the founder and former executive director of Gram Vikas, a non-governmental organization based in the Indian state of Odisha, which highlights water and sanitation concerns faced by various rural communities and tribal groups like the Adivasis.

== Early life ==
Joe Madiath's social activism began at the age of 12 when he helped organize young workers who were employed by his father, helping them fight for better work conditions. As a result, his father sent him away to Infant Jesus Anglo-Indian Boy's High School, a boarding school in Tangasseri, Kollam, Kerala. Years later, his father finally accepted his son's views and supported his work as a social entrepreneur.

Madiath studied English literature at the University of Madras, where he was elected the President of the students' union at Loyola College, Chennai. There, he founded the Young Students' Movement for Development (YSMD). During this time, he also cycled solo across India, gaining insights into the plight of the poor.

In 1971, Madiath led 400 YSMD volunteers to West Bengal to manage relief camps for refugees from the Bangladesh Liberation War. Witnessing the devastation of the 1971 Odisha cyclone, and realising the comparatively little attention received by disaster victims, Madiath and a small group of volunteers shifted their attention there. Once their relief efforts were completed, Madiath and a few colleagues from the YSMD decided to stay in Odisha to work as development activists. On invitation from the district authorities, they moved to the Ganjam district in 1976 to begin work with Adivasi communities. In 1979, Madiath founded Gram Vikas.

== Work with Gram Vikas ==
Since 1979, with Joe Madiath serving as executive director, Gram Vikas has worked mainly with Adivasi communities in rural Orissa on several development projects, including biogas promotion, community forestry, rural habitat development, and education. The bulk of Gram Vikas' efforts have focused on water and sanitation solutions for the rural poor of Odhisa.

Gram Vikas uses the "universally important needs of drinking water and sanitation" to bond villagers and make them realise how collective action can lead to gains for the community. The fundamentals of Gram Vikas' approach are 100% participation from all villagers, with "clearly defined stakes and mechanisms for institutional and financial sustainability."

== Work on water & sanitation ==
Madiath focused on water and sanitation as the entry point in the village development work, partnering with village communities to regenerate thousands of hectares of "wasteland,” eliminating open defecation and significantly reducing the incidence of waterborne diseases, building disaster-proof houses, enabling thousands of women to lead village institutions, educate hundreds of girls, and more. By 2018, Gram Vikas has reached 83,000 households with water and sanitation services mainly in Odhisa, but also in Jharkhand, Madhya Pradesh, and Andhra Pradesh.

== Work on education ==
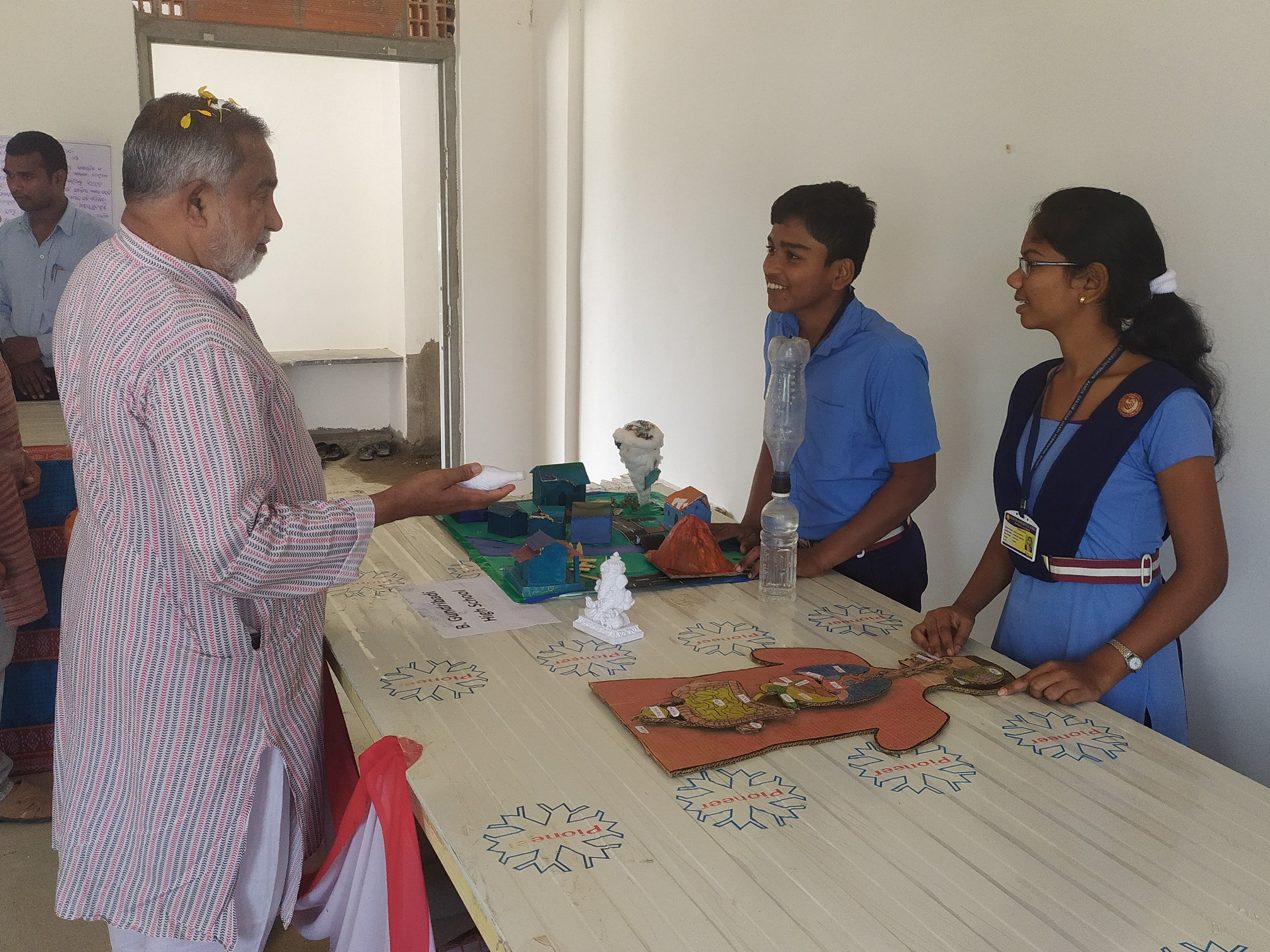
Joe Madiath interacting with students of his school

Joe Madiath has also founded four tribal residential schools collectively called Gram Vikas Residential School serving the kids of tribal communities in remote villages in the Ganjam, Gajapati, and Kalahandi districts of Odisha. The school caters to over 1,200 tribal kids. It features an active sports program, science and innovation program, arts and design program, and a government-funded Atal Tinkering Lab started in 2018.

== Awards ==
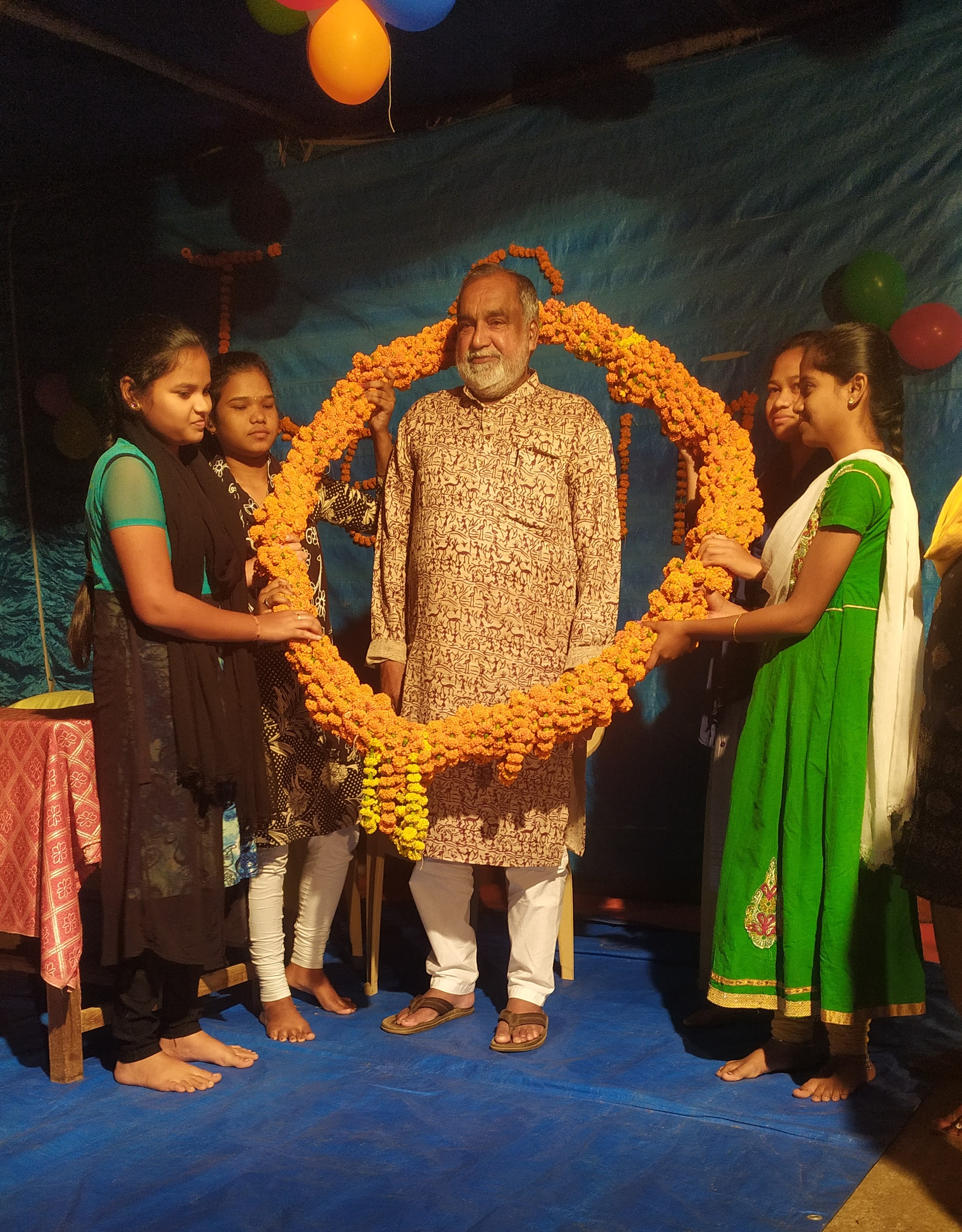
Joe Madiath felicitated on his 70th birthday

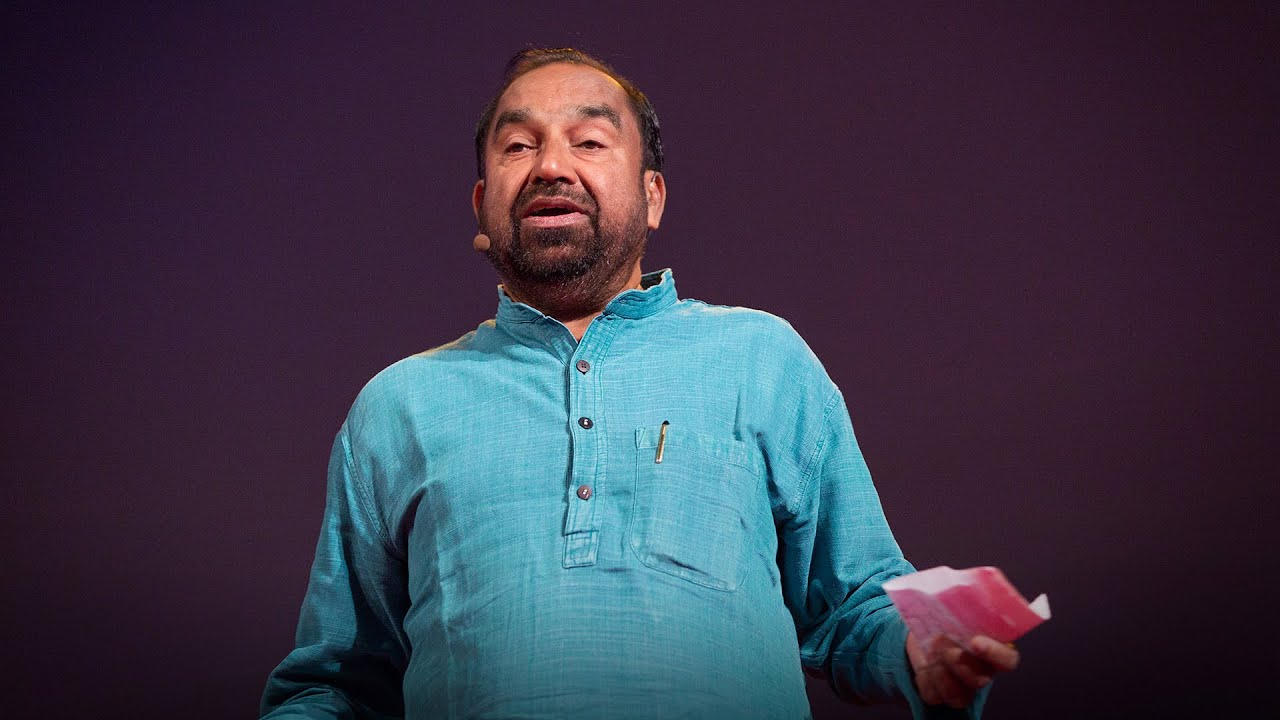
Joe Madiath giving a TED Talk

=== Personal recognition ===
- Asian Development Bank's Water Champion Award
- Schwab Foundation's Outstanding Social Entrepreneur
- Godfrey Phillips Red and White Bravery Award – Social Lifetime Achievement Award (2005)
- Doctor of Divinity, honoris causa – Gurukul Lutheran Theological College
- Lok Samman Award (2009)
- Lifetime Achievement Award for Social Work by Parichay Foundation (2016)

=== Awarded to Gram Vikas ===
Year	Title
1995 1996	Alan Shawn Feinstein World Hunger Award
1998	Dr. K.S. Rao Memorial National Award
2001	Global Development Network – Japanese Award for Most Innovative Development Project
2003	World Habitat Award
2003	Tech Museum Awards Laureate – Accenture Economic Development Award
2006	Kyoto World Water Grand Prize
2006	Skoll Award for Social Entrepreneurship
2006	Winner – Ashoka Changemakers Competition
2009 2010	UNESCO Water Digest Best Water NGO Award

== See also ==
- Gram Vikas
- Gram Vikas Residential School
