= Bahadur Pentho =

- Village
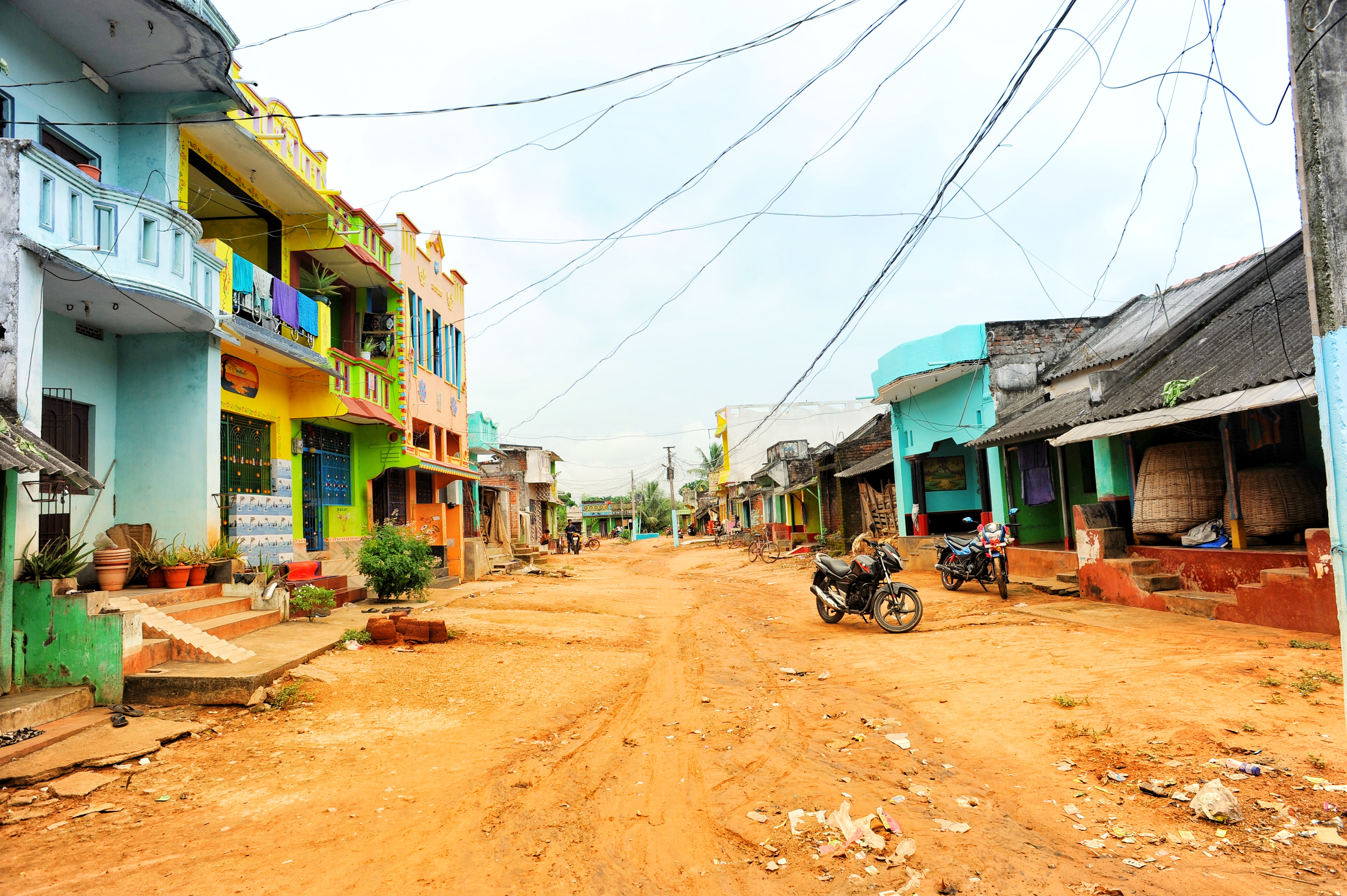
- Nickname: Bahadurpally
- Location in Orissa, India
- Coordinates: 19°10′04″N 84°45′52″E
- Country: India
- State: Odisha
- District: Ganjam
- Elevation: 25.2 m (83 ft)

Population (2018)
  - Total: 2,300

Languages
  - Official: Oriya/Telugu
- Time zone: UTC+5:30 (IST)
- PIN: 761008
- Telephone code: 0680
- Vehicle registration: OD-07
- Nearest city: Berhampur, Ichchapuram
- Sex ratio: 50%-50% ♂/♀
- Climate: Tropical wet and dry (Köppen)
- Website: www.facebook.com/BahadurPentho

Bahadur Pentho is a village in Ganjam district in the south of Odisha, India, bordering Andhra Pradesh. It is located southeast of Berhampur and northeast of Ichchapuram. Alternative forms of the village's name include "Bahadurpeta" and "Bahadurpally".

Bahadur Pentho is a business center catering to surrounding villages. The major occupations are agriculture, trading, and self-employment. Crops are dependent on rain for irrigation. There is a primary school and an Engineering college (Vignan). There is a water tank project of Gram Vikas Jala Porimala Jojona (35,000 liter capacity), around Bahadur Pentho which supplies every home with drinking water. Most residents are bilingual and speak both Odia and Telugu.

== Demographics ==
- 300 meter east:west
- 150 meter north:south
- Total Population: 2300
- Male Population: 1100
- Female Populati: 1200
- Children Under 6 years of age: 400

== Features ==
- There is a primary school.
- There is an engineering college (VITAM)
- There is a gram panchayat office.
- There is a watertank Gram Vikas project.
- There is a Kalyan mandap.

== Temples ==
- Village Temple (ఉరామ్మోరు)

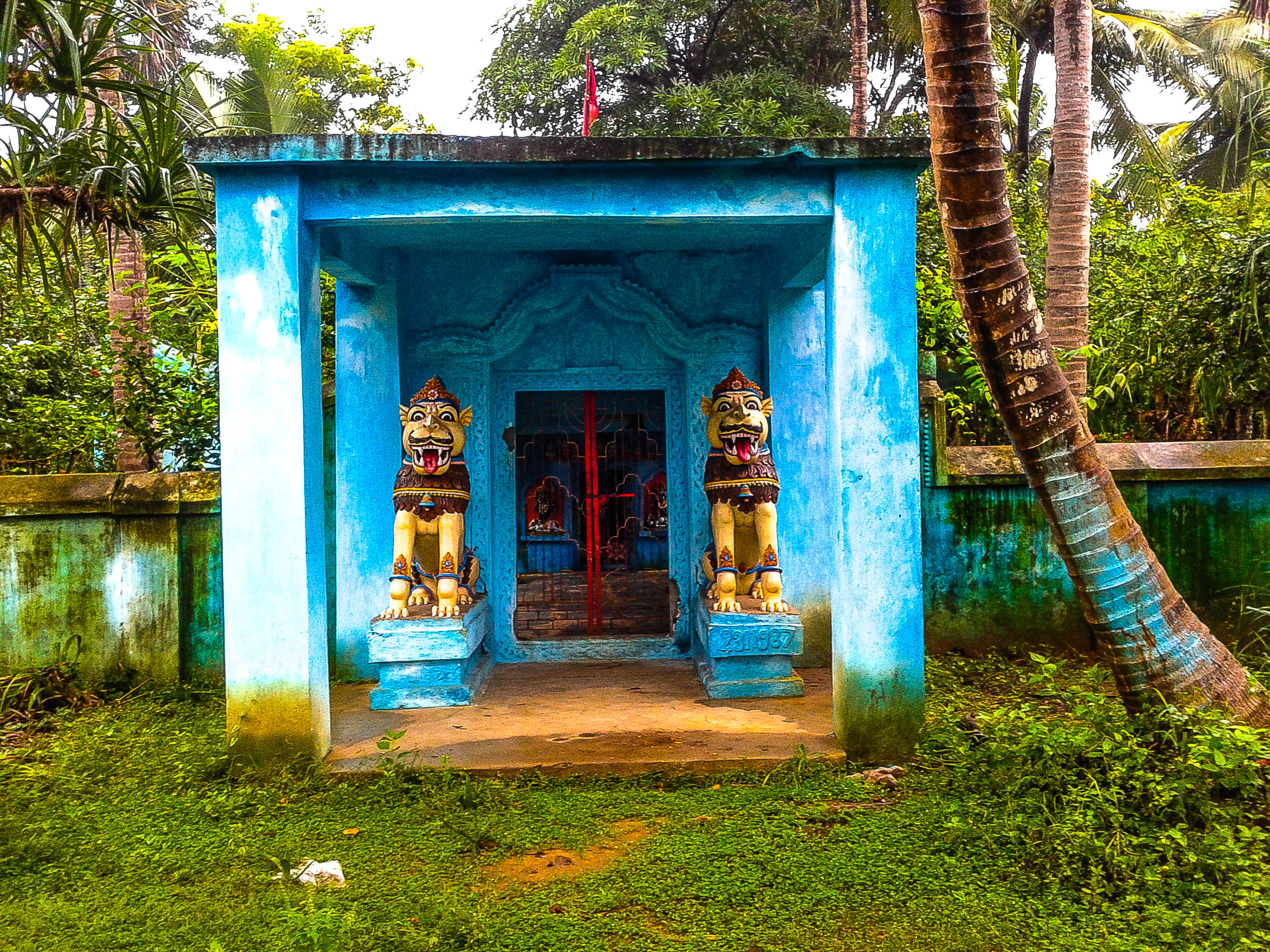
Village Temple of Bahadur Pentho

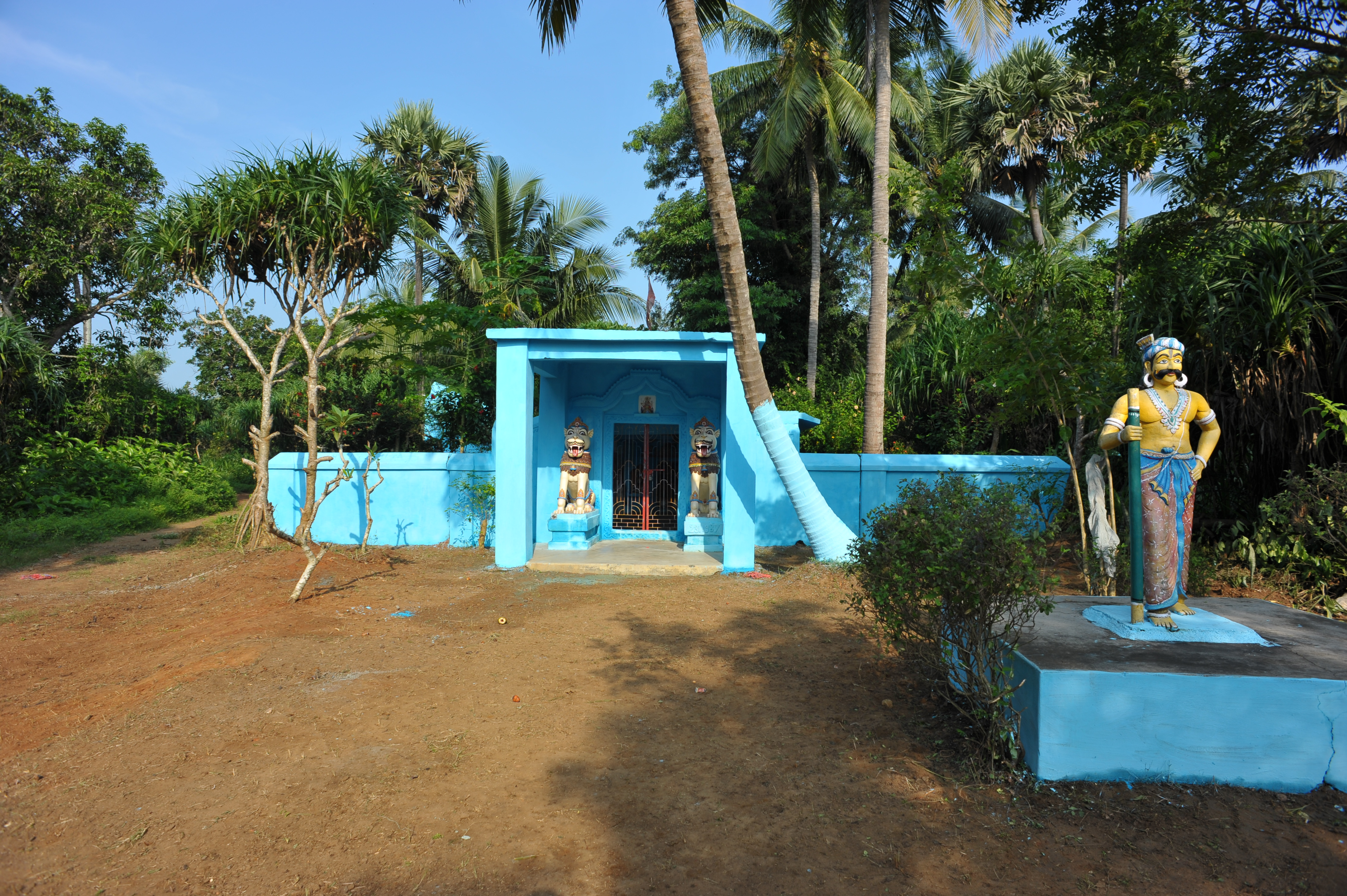
BahadurPenthoVillageTemple

- Trinath Mandir Temple
- Pathalamma Temple
- Hanuman Temple
- Bhajagovindam Temple

== Festivals ==
Ugadi is celebrated as the Telugu New Year. Hindu residents listen to Panchanga recitals by Pundits on the day of Ugadi. This process is called Panchanga Shravanam, which is an important aspect of the festival. Makara Sankranti is also a famous harvest festival which is celebrated across the Village. Every year festivals are "Pathalamma yatra" & "Ammoru yatra" are celebrated with much funfair, around 5,000 people of the yatra. Every 5 years Bhajagovinda yatra is celebrated with "Hari Namam" prayer 24 hours per day for 5 days. Around 10,000 people gather for daily 5 days of the yatra. Just like in other parts of the country, many other festivals include – Dasara, Vinayaka Chaviti, Deepavali, Vasantotsavam, Maha Shivaratri, etc.

== Other temples ==
- Rajamma (Suggu & Dharmala)
- Gandhamma (Paili & Kotta)
- Narsimha (Paili)
- Rajamma (Pedini)
- Narsimha (Dharmala)
- Narsimha (Kota)

== Ponds ==
- Village Pond
- Mangala Pond
- Diguva Pond
- Bairodi Pond

== Photos ==
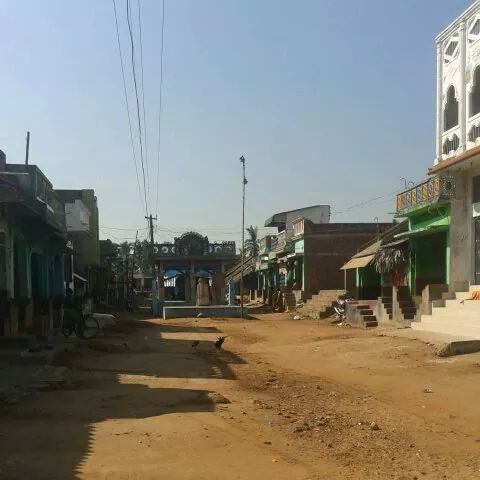
Bahadur Pentho Front

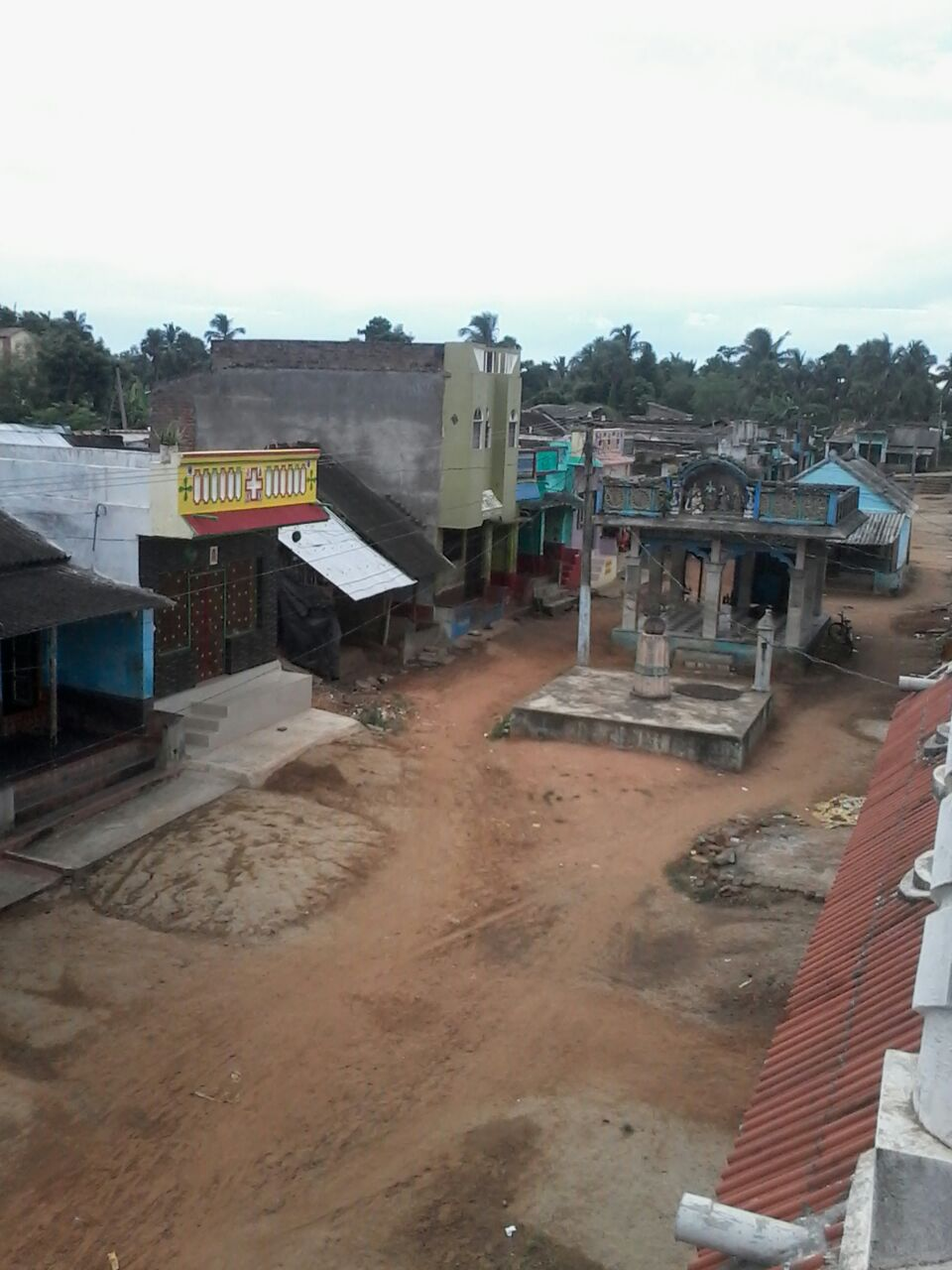
Bahadur Pentho top view

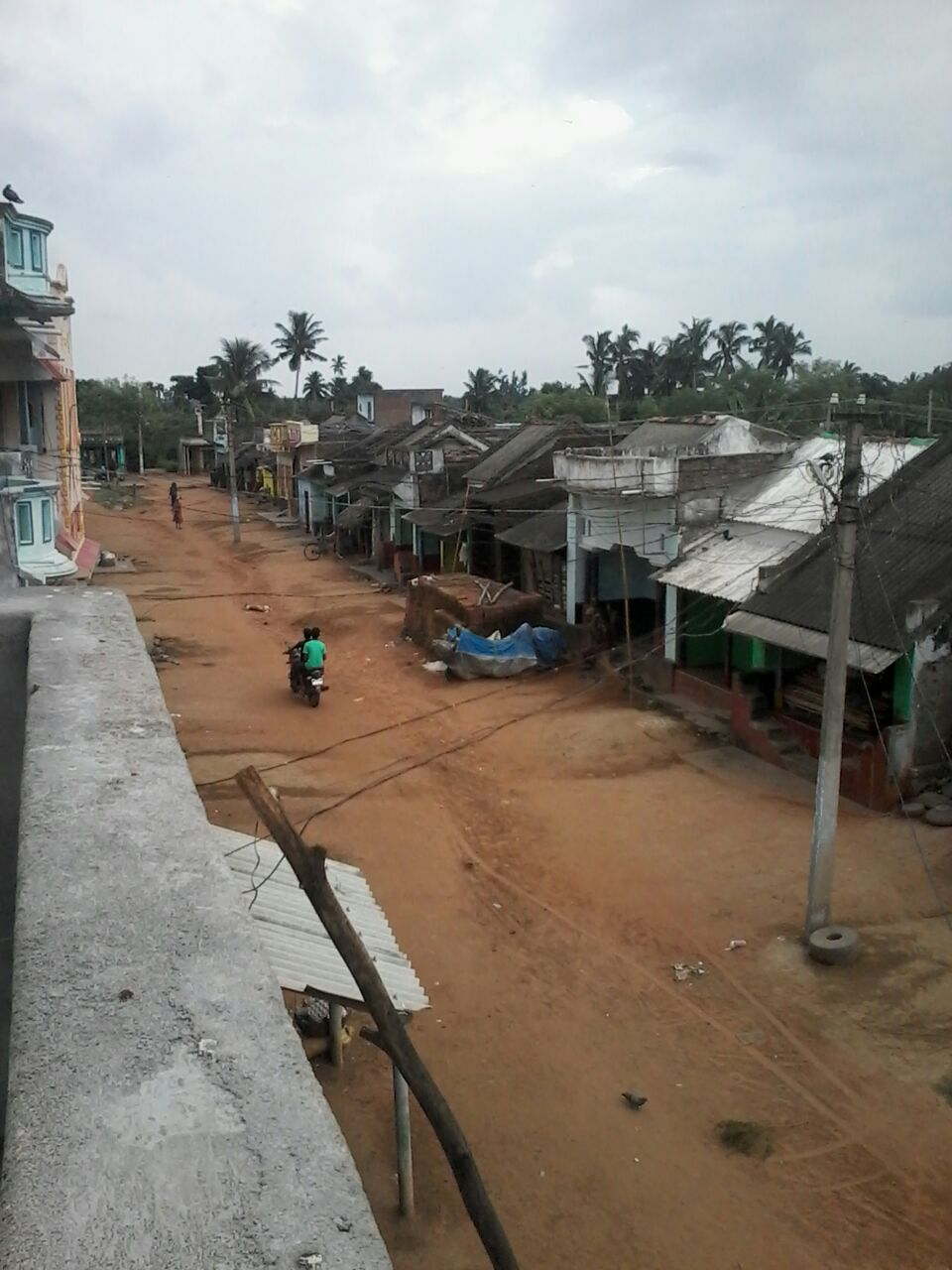
Bahadur Pentho top side view

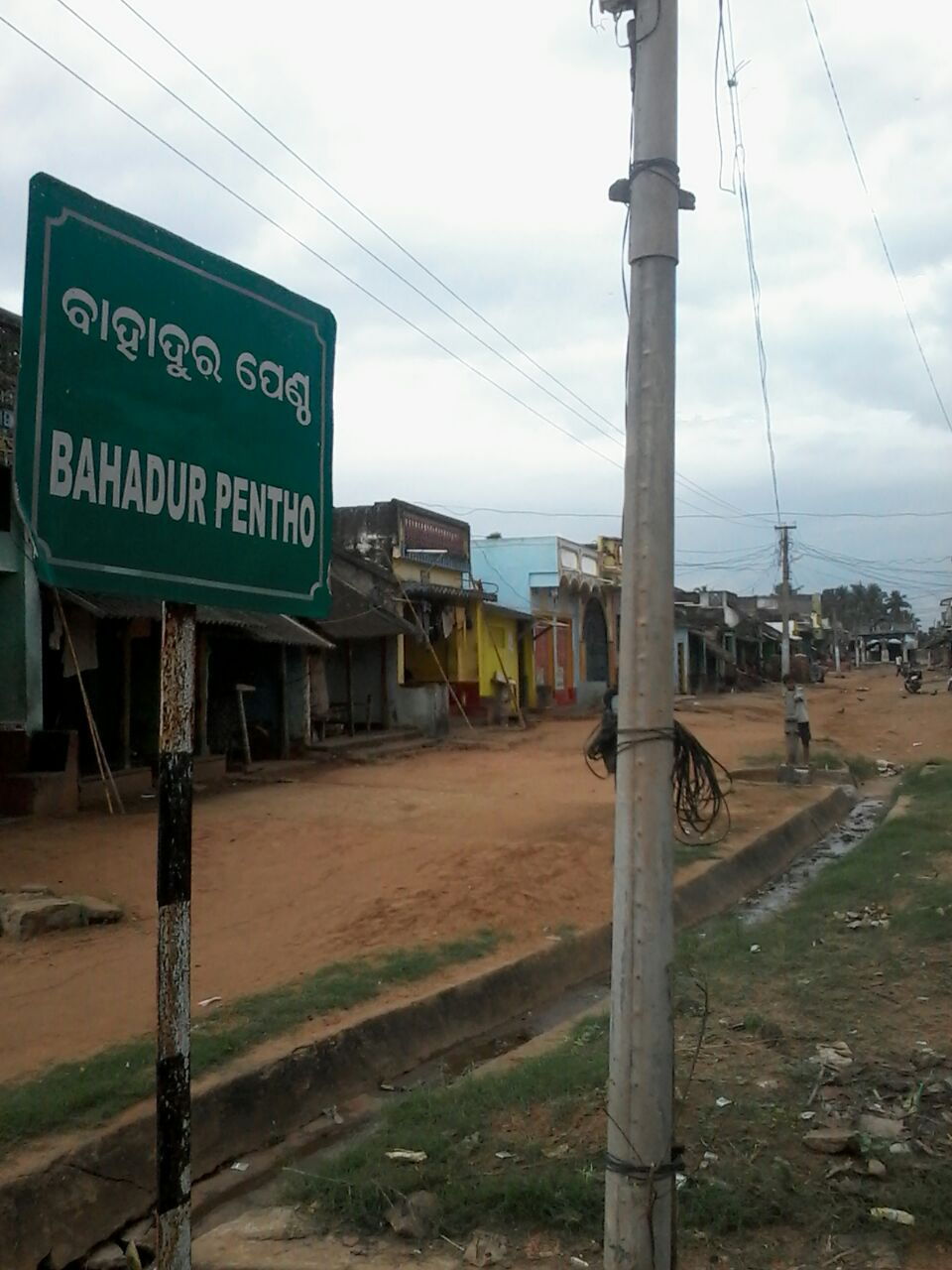
Bahadur Pentho front at road pint

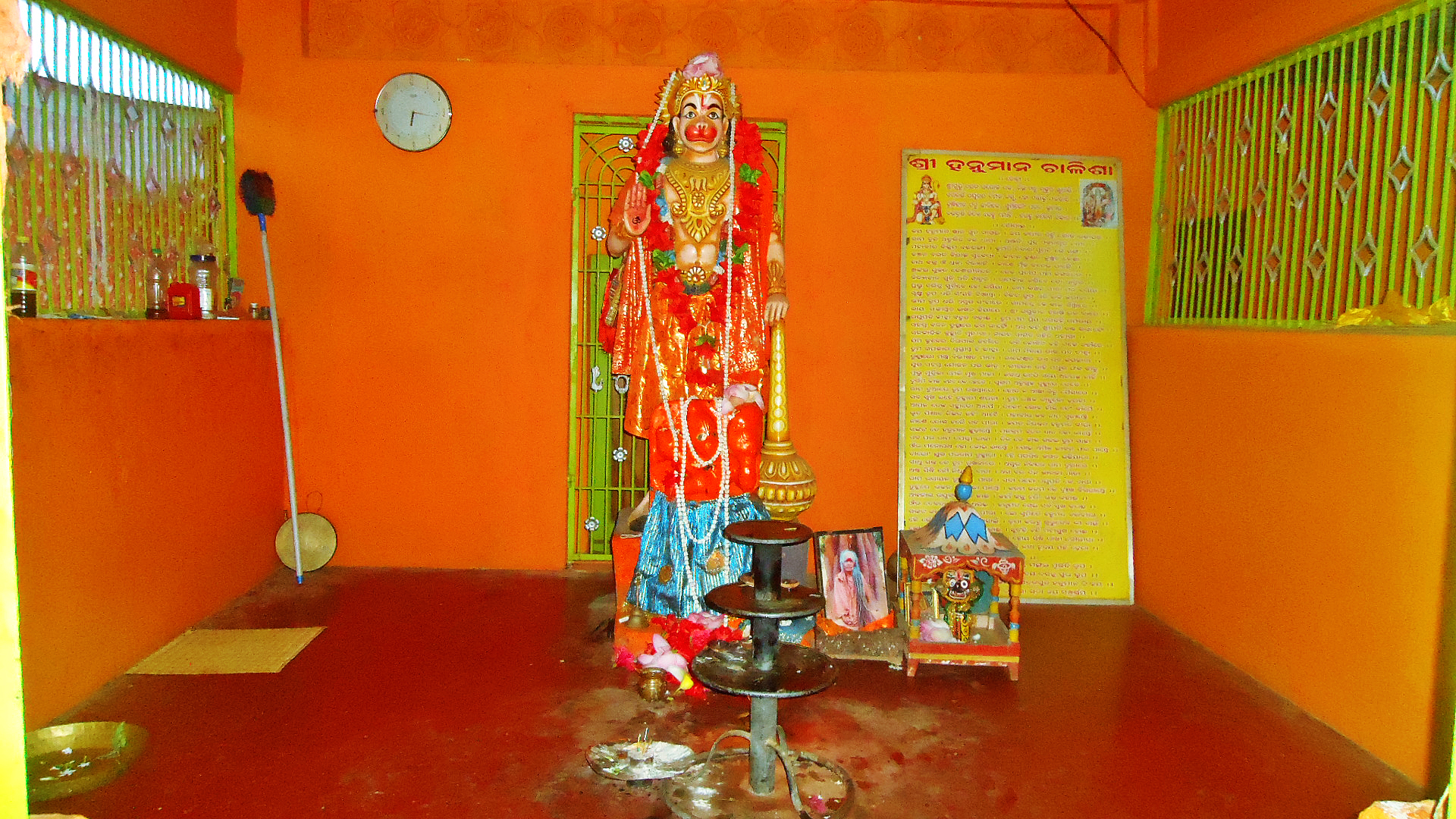
Hanuman Temple

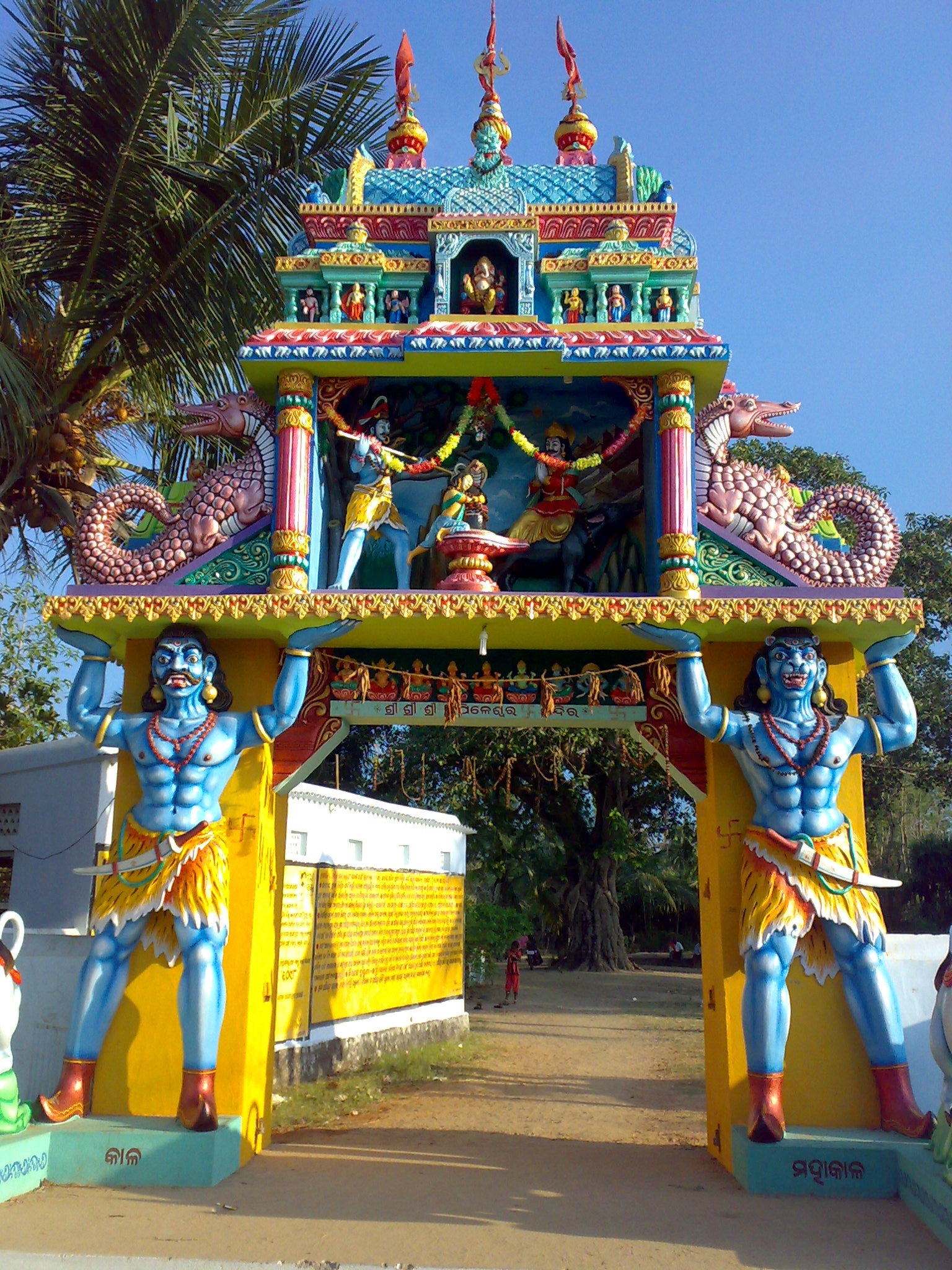
Bhairabi Temple

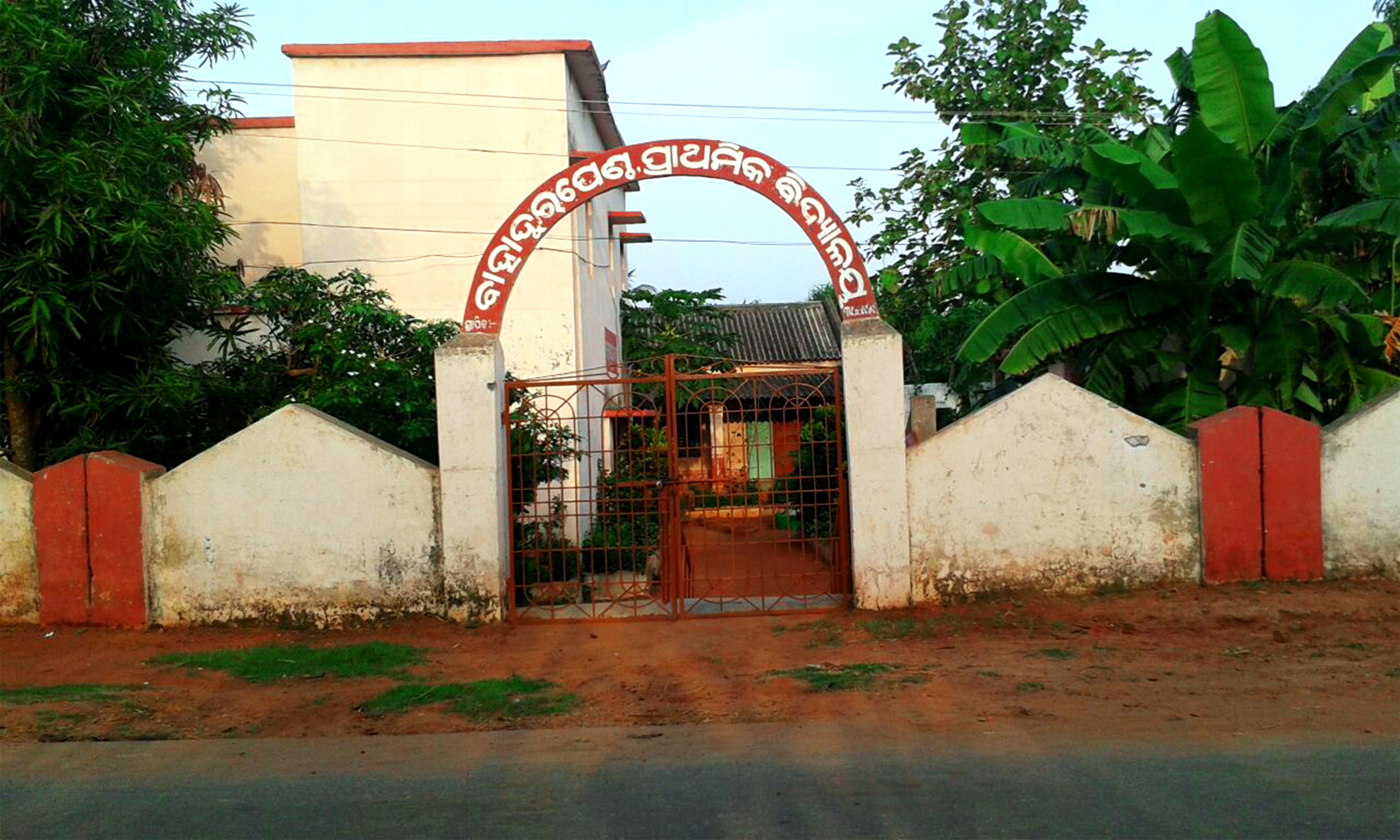
Primary school of BahadurPentho

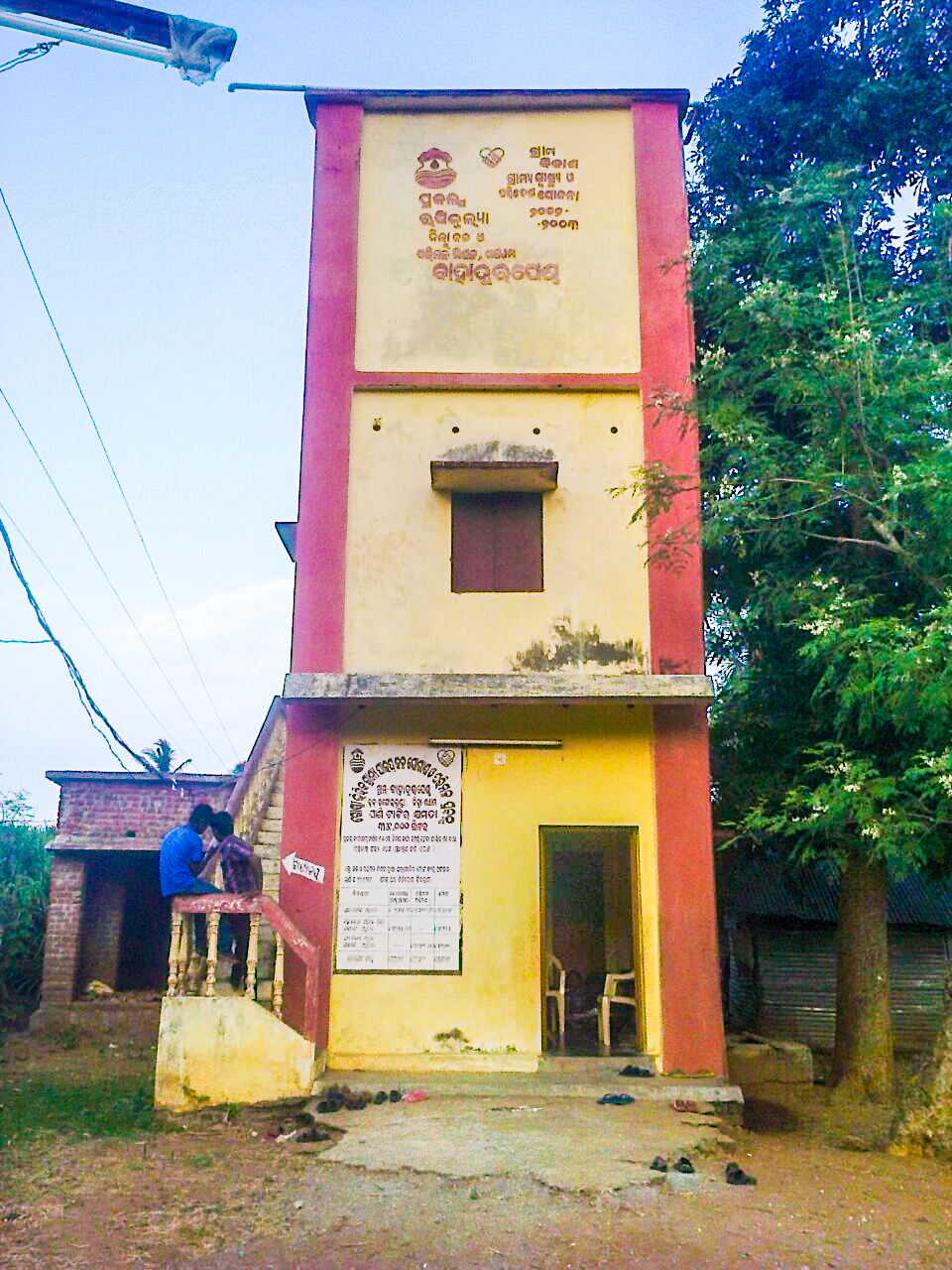
Gram Vikas Water Tank
