= Zeinali =

Zeinali is a surname. Notable people with the surname include:

- Ali Zeinali (born 1990), Iranian footballer
- Saeed Zeinali (born 1976), Iranian student
- Vigen Zeinali (fl. from 2015), retired Iranian-Armenian football player
