= Bikas =

Bikas or Bikás may refer to

- Bikas (surname)
- Bikás park, a metro station in Budapest, Hungary
- Nepal Rastriya Bikas Party, a political party in Nepal
- Rastriya Bikas Party, a political party in Nepal
- Rastriya Jana Bikas Party, a political party in Nepal

== See also ==
- Bika (disambiguation)
- Vikas (disambiguation)
