= Viken =

Viken may refer to:

- Viken, Scandinavia, a historical region
- Viken (county), a former Norwegian county (2020–2023)
- Viken, Sweden, a bimunicipal locality in Skåne County, Sweden
- Viken (lake), a lake in Sweden, part of the Göta canal
- IF Viken, a Swedish association football team
- Viken (surname)
- Vestre Viken Hospital Trust, a health trust in Norway

== See also ==
- Vigen (disambiguation)
