= Purvanchal Vikas Party =

Purvanchal Vikas Party (Purvanchal Development Party, PVP) is a political party founded ahead of the 2004 Lok Sabha election in the Indian state of Punjab.

PVP emerged as a group representing migrant labourers from the Hindi belt region in and around the city of Ludhiana. Amongst other issues, PVP intended to construct a 'Purvanchal Bhavan' (Eastern Building) for migrant labourers. The convenor of the party (until a regular conference was held) was T.R. Misra.

In the 2007 assembly election in Uttar Pradesh, PVP launched only one candidate, Ashiquazzaman in Gorakhpur. Ashiquazzaman got 104 votes (0.11% of the votes in the constituency).
