= Vikas =

Vikas - Indian Name
- Pronunciation: Vih-kaas
- Gender: male

Origin
- Origin: Indian Orchard
- Meaning: expanding, progress or development
- Region of origin: Greater India

Vikas means expanding, progress or development in Sanskrit. It is often used as a masculine given name in Greater India. You would find people with this name all over India. Vikas and Pragati both means development. But Vikas name is given to males while Pragati to females.

== Notable people ==
=== Bikas ===
- Bikas K. Chakrabarti (born 1952), Indian physicist
- Bikas Mishra, Indian Filmmaker

=== Bikash ===
- Bikash Bhattacharjee (1940–2006), Indian painter from Kolkata in West Bengal
- Bikash Ranjan Bhattacharya, Indian politician
- Charu Bikash Chakma, Bangladeshi Chakma politician
- Bikash Singh Chhetri (born 1992), footballer from Nepal
- Bikash Chowdhury (1932–2005), Indian politician
- Bikash Chowdhury (cricketer) (1938–2019), Indian former cricketer
- Bikash Dali (born 1980), Nepalese cricketer
- Bikash Jairu (born 1990), Indian professional footballer
- Bikash Malla (born 1986), footballer from Nepal
- Bikash Panji, Indian football Midfielder
- Bikash Roy, actor in Bengali cinema
- Bikash Sarkar (born 1965), Bengali poet, writer, journalist and editor
- Bikash Sinha, Indian physicist, active in nuclear physics and high energy physics

=== Vikas ===
- Vikas (actor) (born 1975), Indian actor
- Vikas Anand, Indian actor
- Vikas Bahl (born 1971), Indian film producer, director
- Vikas Bhalla (born 1972), Indian actor and singer
- Vikas Dubey (1964–2020), Indian history-sheeter and gangster
- Vikas Gowda (born 1983), discus thrower
- Vikas Gupta, American businessman
- Vikas Gupta, Indian television producer
- Vikas Joshi, Indian businessman
- Vikas Kalantri (born 1978), Hindi actor
- Vikas Kashalkar (born 1950), Hindustani classical vocalist
- Vikas Khanna (born 1971), Indian chef
- Vikas Kohli, Canadian musician and producer
- Vikas Krishan Yadav (born 1992), Indian boxer
- Vikas Kumar (born 1977), Indian dialogue coach and actor
- Vikas Mahatme (born 1957), eye surgeon
- Vikas Manaktala (born 1987), Indian actor
- Vikas Mishra (born 1992), Indian cricketer
- Vikas Mishra (economist) (1924–2008), Indian economist
- Vikas Sethi (born 1976), Indian actor
- Vikas Shankarrao Kumbhare, Indian politician
- Vikas Swarup, Indian novelist and diplomat
- Vikas Upadhyay, Indian politician
- Vikas Uppal (1986–2007), said to be India's tallest man
- Vikas Yadav (murderer) (born 20th century), Indian criminal
- Vikas Thakur (born 1989), Indian weightlifter
- Vikas Tokas (born 1986), Indian cricketer
- Vikas Jain (born Unknown), Indian businessman, co-founder of Micromax Informatics Limited

== See also ==
- Bika (surname)
