= Bikaner style of painting =

Rajasthani style of Indian painting

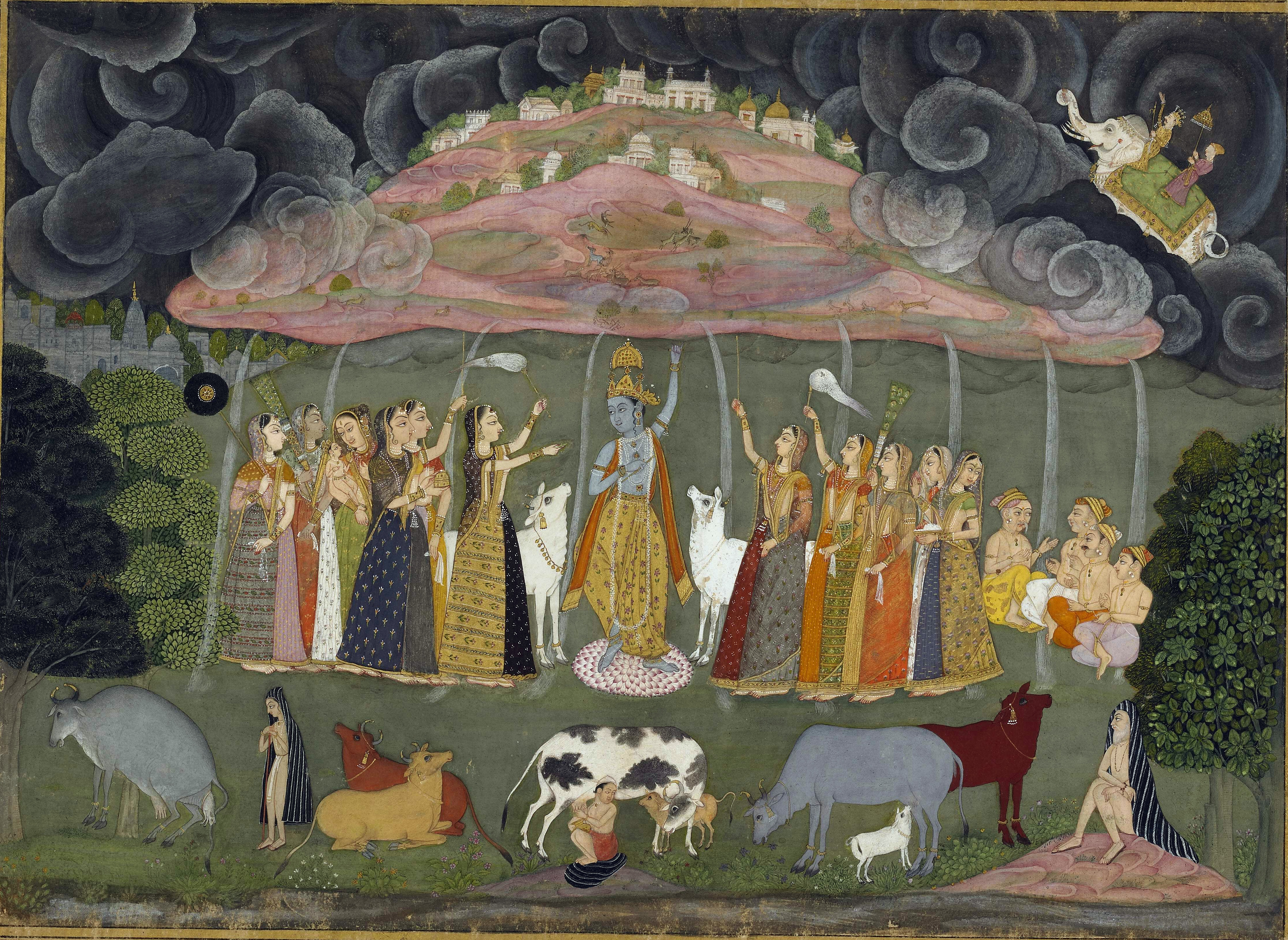
Krishna lifts Mount Govardhan by Ustad Sahibdin, c. 1690. British Museum

The Bikaner style of painting is a Rajasthani style of Indian painting developed in the city of Bikaner, capital of Bikaner State. It is one of the many schools of Rajput painting that developed in the late 17th century with the help of artists from the imperial Mughal workshops, who dispersed after these were run down in the reign of Aurangzeb, who ceased to patronize Mughal painting. The subjects are most either court portraits, or illustrations to Hindu texts. The Bikaner style is more closely related to the Mughal one than many other Rajput styles, also with some elements of Deccan style.

During the reign of Raja Karan Singh (r. 1632–69) there were close connections with the court of the emperor Shah Jahan, while the imperial workshops were still flourishing, and some Mughal-style subject matter began to appear late in this reign. Karan Singh's youngest son, Anup Singh (later raja, 1674–98), was a general commanding Mughal forces, especially in the Deccan, where he was based in Hyderabad for some time. This very likely accounts for the Deccan influences apparent in later paintings. His best artist, Ruknuddin (Rukn/h ud din Firuz), travelled with him, and many other Bikaner painters were relatives of his; other artists emigrated from the Deccan to Bikaner.

== Description ==
The subjects painted often originate from Indian mythology. Raja Rai Singh was particularly influenced by Mughal art. They painted scenes from the Ragmala, Bhagavata Purana, and Rasalila.

What distinguishes the Bikaner style of painting from other Rajasthani styles of painting are finer lines and a more reserved range of colours than what are typically present in Mughal artwork. Ali Raza painted paintings of Lakshmi Narayana and a portrait of Karan Singh. Ruknuddin used the technique of painting fountains and court scenes using a nature-based background. Later Bikaneri art focused on Bikaner’s architecture such as havelis in the city. Bikaneri artists displayed their work outside royal courts giving businessmen and landlords the chance to appreciate this style of art.

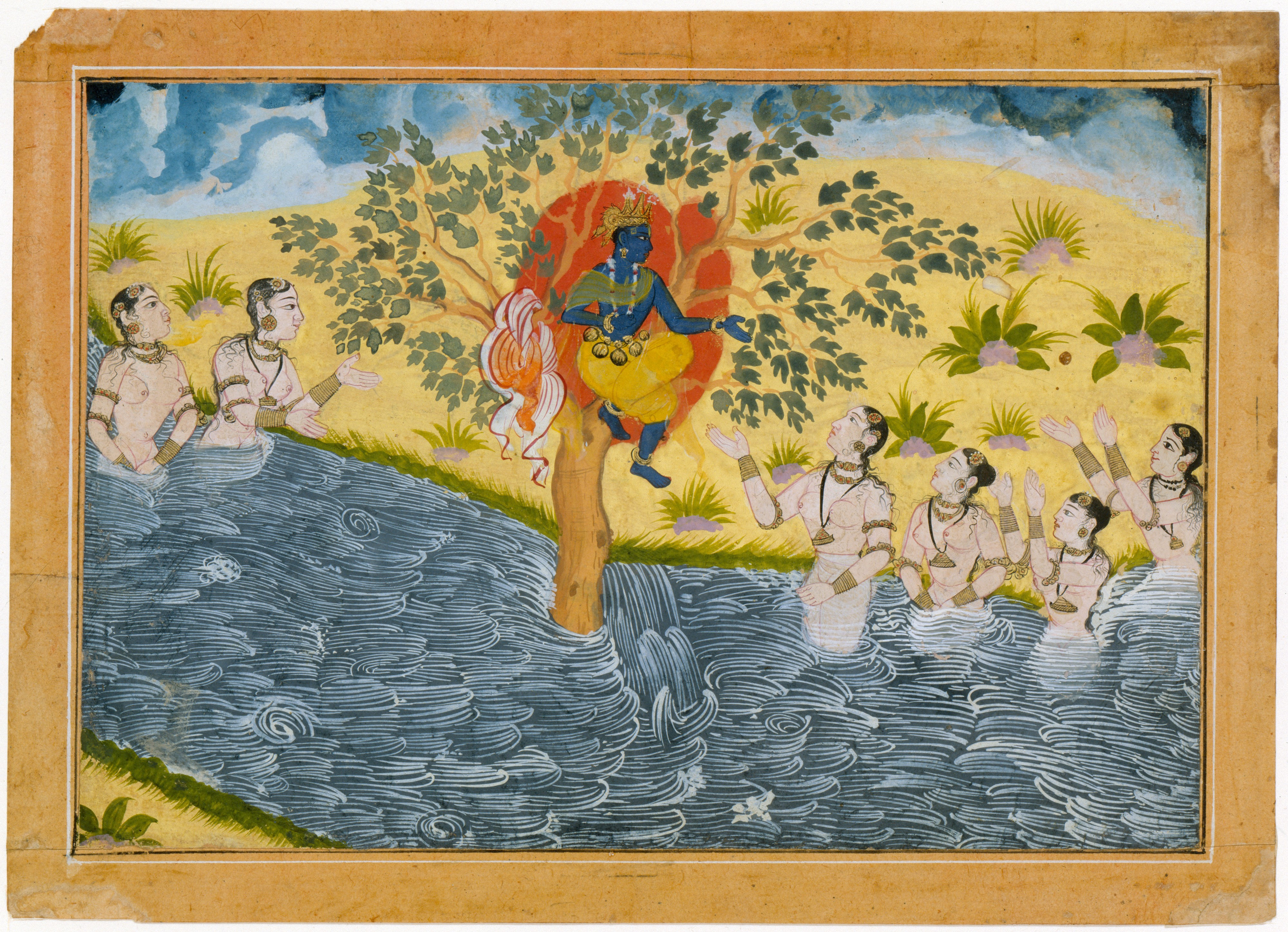
The Gopis Plead with Krishna to Return Their Clothing, from a Bhagavata Purana, c. 1610. Metropolitan Museum of Art

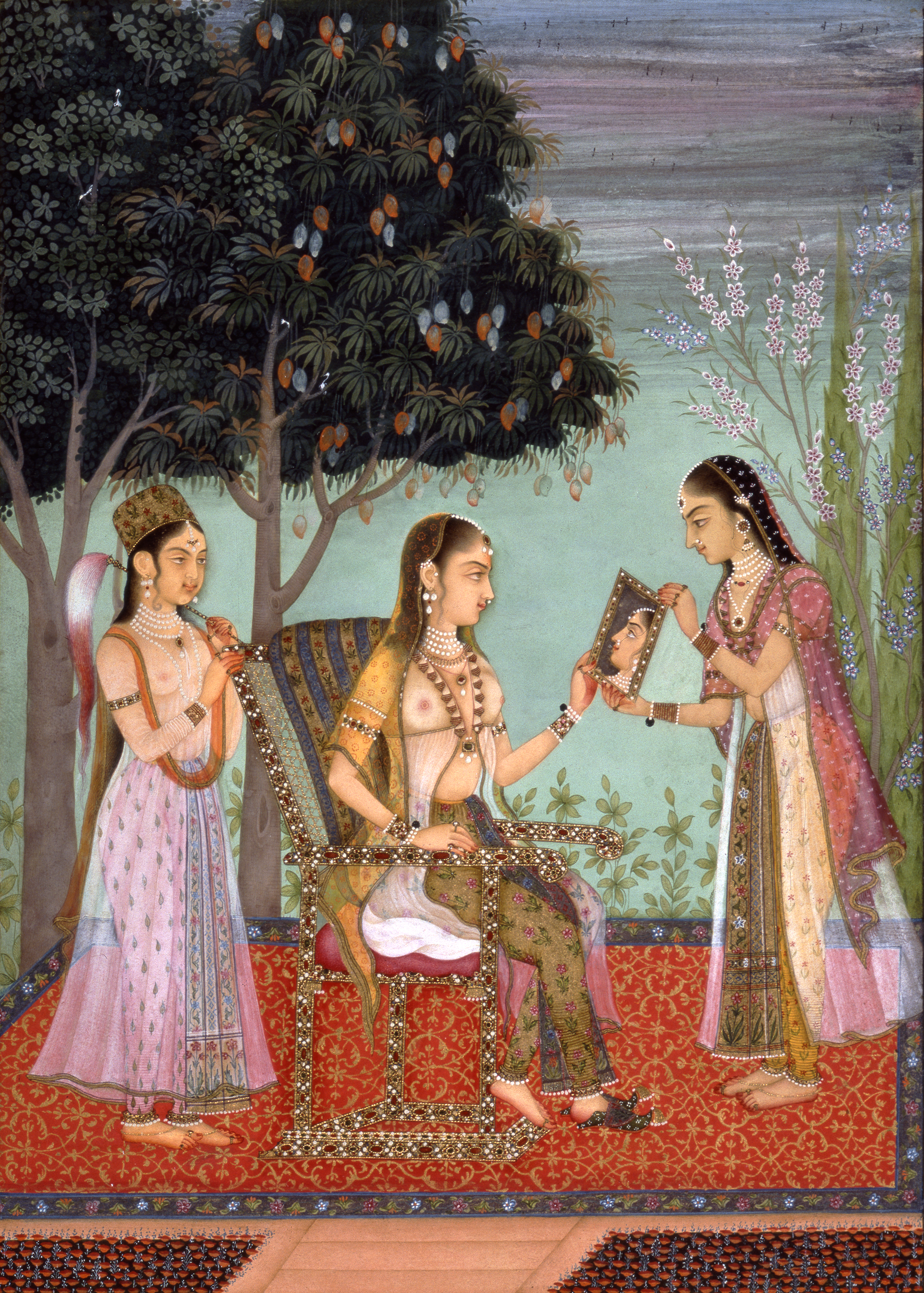
Gazing Fondly in the Mirror by Natthu Umrani, 1665. San Diego Museum of Art

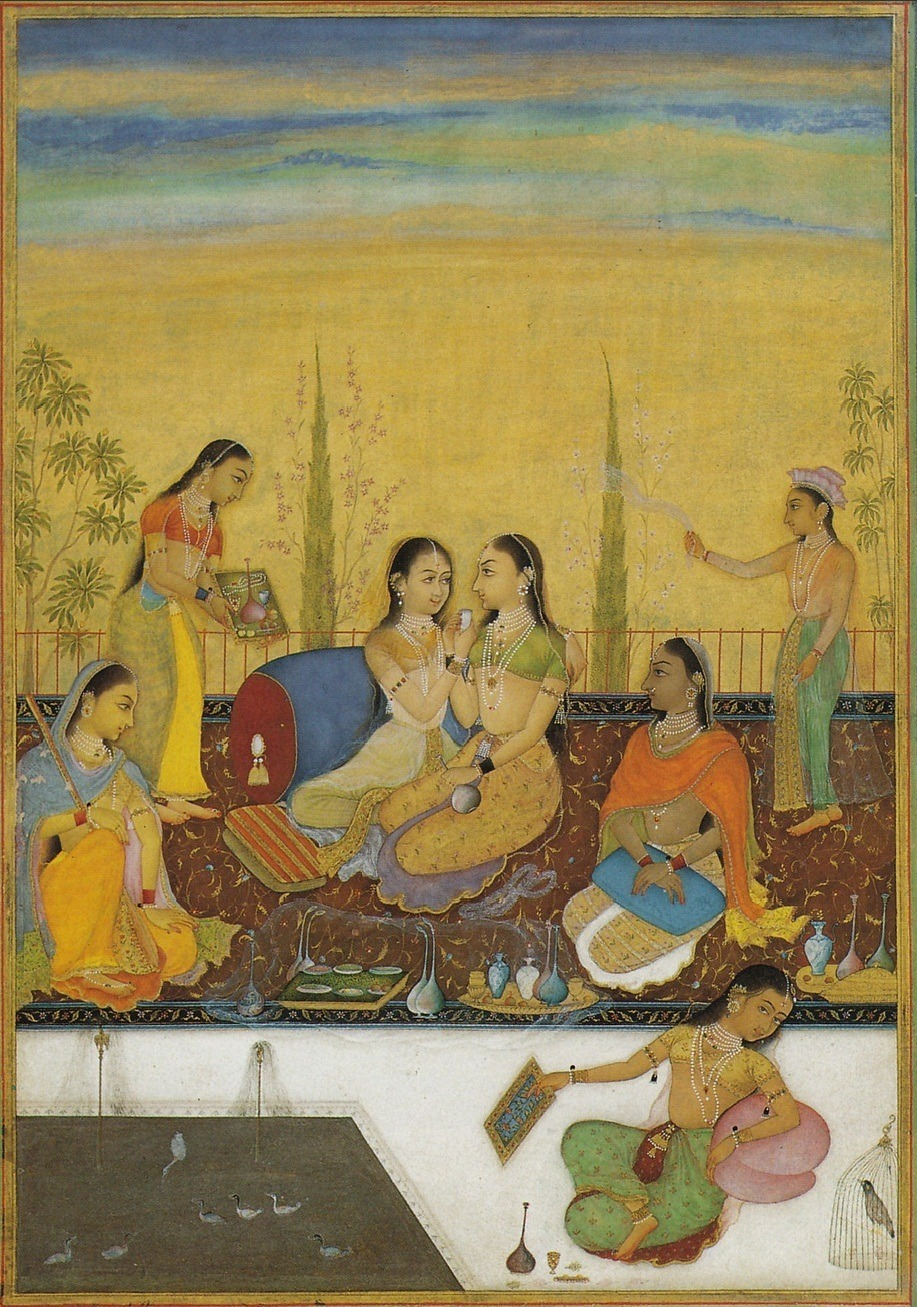
Ladies of the zenana on a roof terrace by Ruknuddin. Bikaner, 1675. Kronos Collections

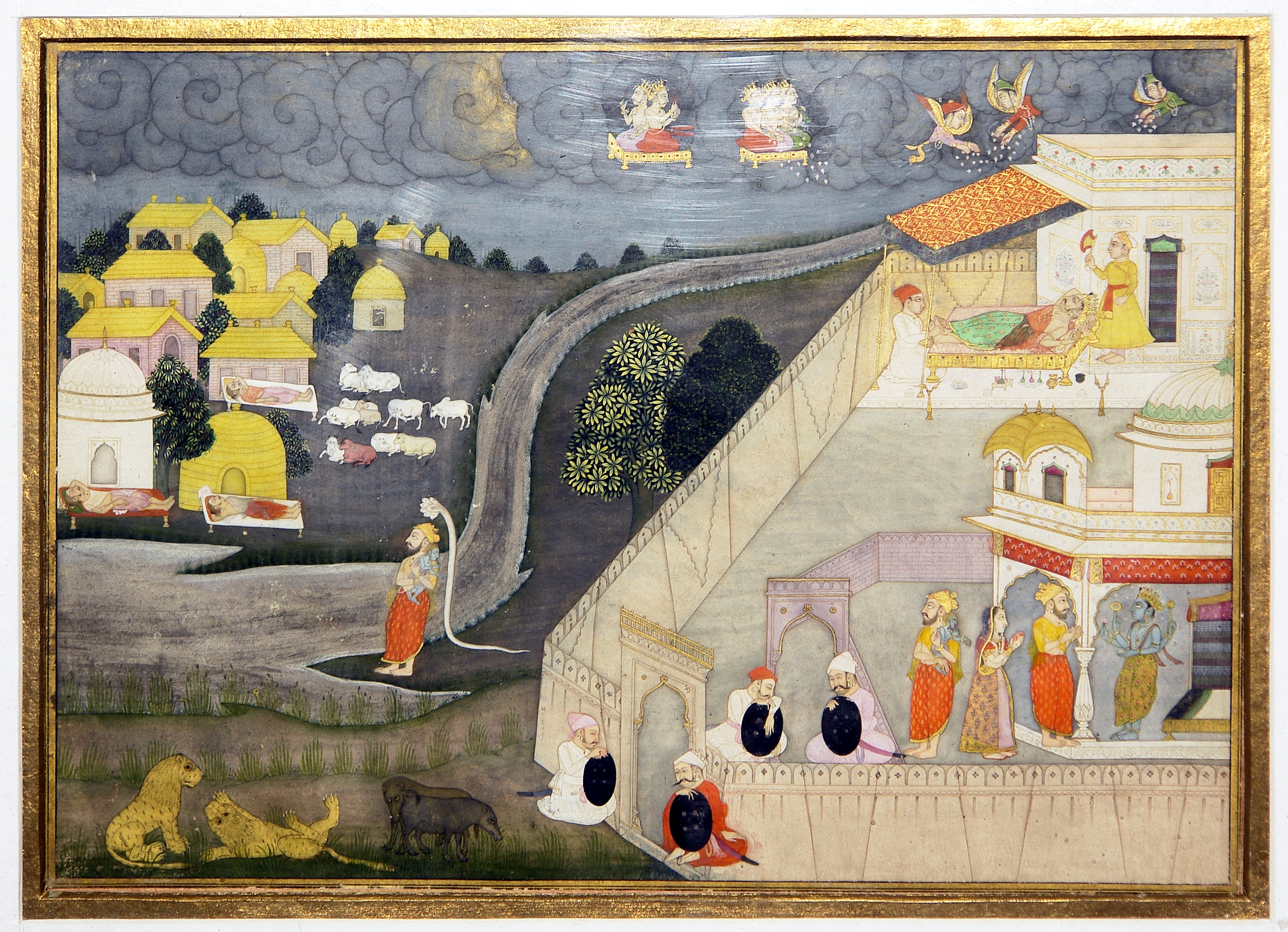
Vishnu revealing his divinity to Vasudeva and Devaki, National Museum, New Delhi, c. 1725.

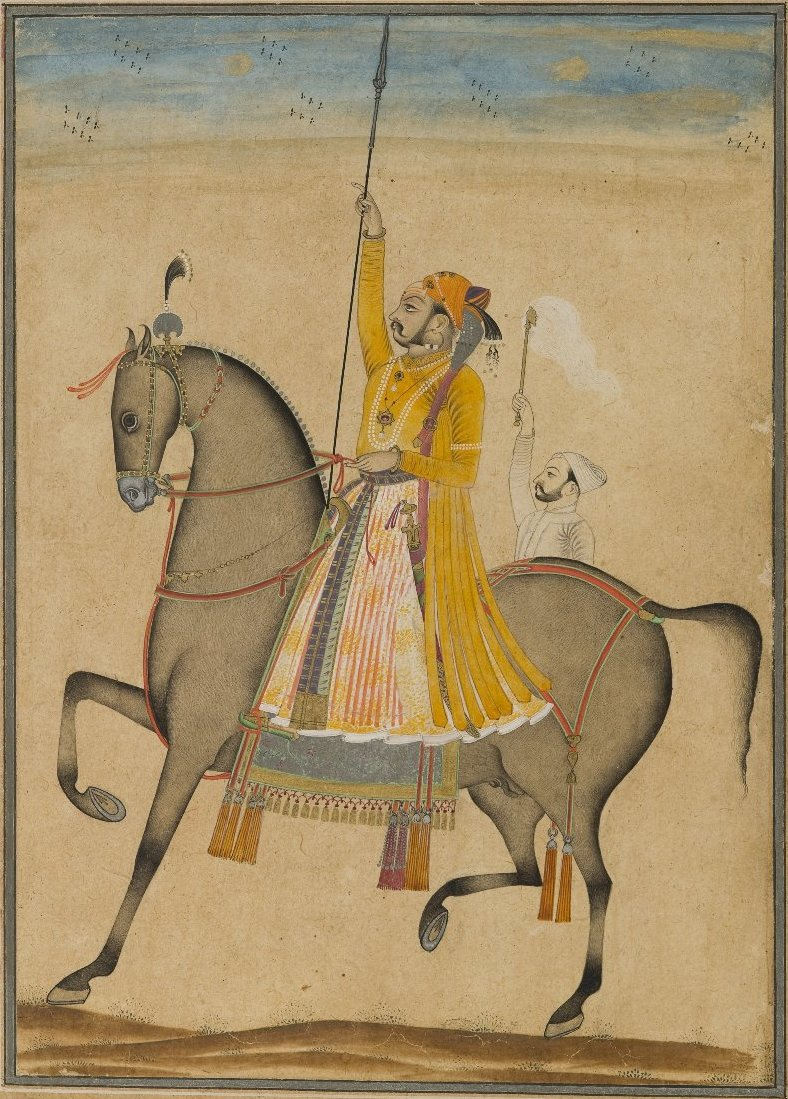
Equestrian Portrait of Maharaja Sujan Singh of Bikaner, by Kasam, Son of Muhammad, 1740s. Brooklyn Museum

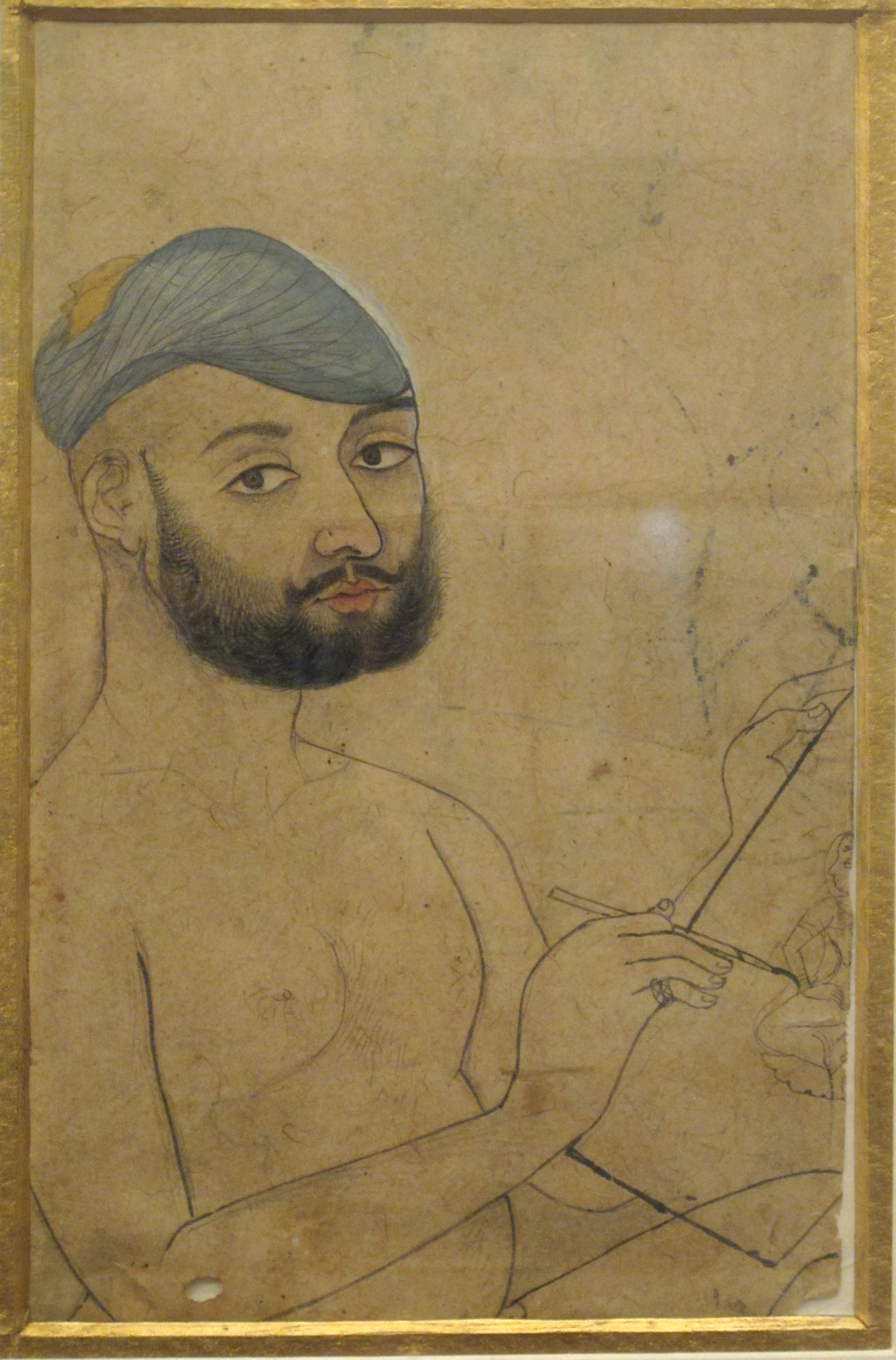
Artist painting a lady, c. 1780-90. National Museum, New Delhi
