= Gram Vikas =

- Founded: 1979; Mohuda, Odisha
- Founder: Joe Madiath
- Type: Non-governmental organisation
- Purpose: Water, sanitation, Livelihoods, Education and Village Institutions
- Location: Bhubaneswar, Odisha, India
- Region served: Odisha and Jharkhand
- Method: Empowerment, gender equality, sustainability, self-governance
- Key people: Joe Madiath; (Chairman); Liby T Johnson; (Executive Director)
- Website: www.GramVikas.org

Gram Vikas is an Indian non-governmental organisation based in Odisha, and founded in 1979. Gram Vikas works towards building capabilities of village communities, strengthening community institutions and mobilising resources. Gram Vikas works on six focus areas which are water, livelihoods, sanitation & hygiene, habitat & technologies, village institutions and education.

n. The organisation continues to work towards sustainable development, aiming to enable resilient and dignified lives for five million people by 2030

"Gram Vikas" translates to "village development", both in Hindi and in Odia language, the official language of Odisha.

== History ==
=== Origins ===
Led by Joe Madiath, 400 volunteers from the Young Students Movement for Development, Chennai came to Odisha after the 1971 Odisha cyclone to undertake relief and rehabilitation work in the affected areas. They worked in villages in the then Cuttack district developing lift irrigation projects. This helped increase agricultural productivity for the farmers, but had little impact on the poor, who were mostly landless. Looking to do more work with the poor, they accepted an invitation from the Ganjam district administration to work with Adivasi communities in the district. The original plan was to develop a dairy cooperative. The team soon realised that working on dairy development will not benefit the tribal communities.

=== Mobilisation for rights & development: 1979 onwards ===
The Kondh tribe of the Kerandimal hills in Ganjam district were suffering at the hands of liquor merchants and from land alienation. The Kerandimal Gana Sangathan was mobilised as a movement of the Adivasi community to obtain their rights to address the development needs of the villages. The Adivasi Bhumi Adhikar Sangha, a peoples' movement in Thuamul Rampur block of Kalahandi, successfully resisted the move to convert tribal agricultural lands into tea plantations and were able to retain control over their land.

The organisation then expanded its work to cover areas in Gajapati and Kalahandi districts working with Saura and Kondh tribes. The Integrated Tribal Development Programme supported village communities in community health, non-formal education, small savings and forest protection. Village Water & Sanitation Committees have been supported, to anchor, own and, manage community access to safe sanitation and water. VWSCs have been the key community institution interface for Gram Vikas since 1998.

=== Education: 1982 onwards ===
In remote tribal villages, government schools either did not exist or were not functioning. Education levels were very poor and the exploitation of people because illiteracy was high. Gram Vikas started balwadis, non-formal education centres and adult literacy programme in the Villages. Soon it became clear that NFE would never give tribal children the opportunity to join the mainstream education system and fully reach their potential. To meet this need, Kerandimal Middle Education School, a residential school for tribal children was established at Kankia, Ganjam district in 1982.

The four residential schools, managed now by independent trusts, cater to more than 1200 boys and girls from remote tribal villages. Mahendratanaya Ashram School was established at Koinpur, Gajapati district in 1992. In 1995, the KME school was upgraded as the Gram Vikas Residential School. Gram Vikas Shikhya Niketan was established at Kumudabahal in Kalahandi district in 1998. Gram Vikas Vidya Vihar was started in Rudhapadar, Ganjam district in 1992.

=== Renewable energy: 1982 onwards ===
Dwindling tree cover increased drudgery of women in collecting fuel for cooking. Biogas was identified as an appropriate technology alternative to address this. Between 1983 and 1993, Gram Vikas built 54,000 biogas plants across villages of Odisha. Gram Vikas has continued to adapt, demystify and disseminate renewable energy technologies for rural development. Work in solar PV, micro-hydro and biofuels for power generation and water pumping.

=== Natural Resource Management: 1985 onwards ===
To address challenges to livelihood security faced by the tribal communities, due to massive deforestation, Gram Vikas initiated the Social forestry Programme in 1985. About 10,000 hectares of private & community wasteland were brought under fruit, fuel & timber yielding species in Ganjam, Gajapati & Kalahandi districts. The tribals of Odisha practice shifting or slash-burn cultivation on hill slopes. Reduced access to common land due to stringent laws resulted in reduced rotation cycles in this practice and the degradation of land. Horticulture interventions and integrated land and water management measures were adopted to address this. Recurring droughts in the region also prompted focus on land and water management based on watershed principles. Water harvesting structures, soil conservation measures and drainage line treatment were taken up on a ridge-to-valley principle. Work on natural resource management also expanded to include the chronic drought-prone areas of Bolangir and Bargarh districts.

=== Habitat Development: 1995 onwards ===
Enabling rural communities to lead a dignified life meant supporting improvements in the physical living environment. Regular natural hazards like cyclone affect lives in coastal Odisha, causing damage to homes and property. Gram Vikas supports rural communities to build cost-effective, disaster-proof houses; community buildings and facilities such as schools, grain banks, roads, drainage etc.

=== Water & Sanitation: 1994 onwards ===
The high levels of morbidity caused by pollution of drinking water sources through improper disposal of human waste need to be addressed through a community-managed, all-inclusive mechanism. The Rural Health & Environment Programme was developed by Gram Vikas in 1995 through wide consultations with village communities in different parts of Odisha. The initiative emphasized the construction of twin leach pit toilets and bathing rooms, along with piped water supply systems, ensuring 24/7 access to clean water.

== Activities ==
Since its inception, Gram Vikas has worked on a variety of development issues, including biogas promotion, community forestry, rural habitat development, and education. Since 2019, Gram Vikas has been working on six focus areas which are water, livelihoods, sanitation & hygiene, habitat & technologies, village institutions and education.

=== Water ===
Gram Vikas mobilizes and supports village communities to build and manage their own piped water supply systems and ensure continuous availability of clean water for drinking and domestic uses. Water integrated with sanitation facilities enable households to adopt safe sanitation practices and reduce drudgery for women. Awareness, knowledge and processes to ensure sustainability of water sources lead to communities becoming water secure in the long run.

=== Livelihoods ===
Gram Vikas ensures the sustainability of land and forest resources, skills people and creates diversified and secure income sources. Tribal communities access their rights over forests. They gain new knowledge in using natural resources thereby improving the land quality and making it more productive.

=== Sanitation and Hygiene ===
The organisation motivates communities to adopt safe sanitation and hygiene behaviour and helps them with building household infrastructure. This integrated water and sanitation model reduces incidents of water-borne diseases and lowers malnutrition rates thereby keeping children and families healthy. Access to private, safe toilets and bathrooms with water affords women dignity and reduces the daily drudgery of fetching and carrying water.

=== Habitat and technologies ===
The organisation has been promoting the use of renewable and appropriate technologies in energy and housing. Together with communities, they build disaster-resistant houses making lives secure during natural disasters. Sustainable energy solutions bring water to and light up households in remote off-grid tribal villages.

=== Village institutions ===
Gram Vikas has been building village-level capabilities, structures and processes to enable stronger self-governance by the communities. The design of these structures and the principles of the processes ensure that women participate and lead. Community institutions take the leadership to influence local government decisions and stake claims to their rightful share in the resources deployed locally.

=== Education ===
The organisation supports Gram Vikas residential schools to provide high-quality and technology up-to-date education for children from Adivasi communities. Children go back to their communities as role models and inspire other families to educate their children. The special focus on girls results in equal or more girls, from communities that have historically had few educated girls, completing school.

=== Outreach ===
As of 2025, Gram Vikas has reached over 600,000 individuals across 1,700 villages in Odisha and Jharkhand.. The organisation's work has ensured the 2,14,920 women have access to safe, private bathrooms with running water and 54,571 families have renewable energy sources for cooking. Work with village communities has resulted in 10,370 hectares of wasteland being regenerated for natural resources-based livelihoods.

== Awards ==
=== Awarded to Gram Vikas ===
- Alan Shawn Feinstein World Hunger Award (1995-1996)
- Dr. K.S. Rao Memorial National Award (1998)
- Global Development Network - Japanese Award for Most Innovative Development Project (2001)
- World Habitat Award (2003)
- Tech Museum Awards Laureate - Accenture Economic Development Award (2003)
- Kyoto World Water Grand Prize (2006)
- Skoll Award for Social Entrepreneurship (2006)
- Winner – Ashoka Changemakers Competition (2006)
- UNESCO Water Digest Best Water NGO Award (2009-2010)
- First Prize - 2nd Bihar Innovation Forum (2014)
- ISC-FICCI Sanitation Award (2018)
- Sat Paul Mittal National Award 2021 for outstanding service to humanity (2021)
- 10th Earth Care Awards 2022 for Community-based Climate Action (2022)

=== Awarded to Founder Joe Madiath ===
- Asian Development Bank's Water Champion Award
- Schwab Foundation's Outstanding Social Entrepreneur
- Godfrey Phillips Red and White Bravery Award - Social Lifetime Achievement Award (2005)
- Doctor of Divinity, honoris causa – Gurukul Lutheran Theological College
- Lok Samman Award (2009)
- Lifetime Achievement Award for Social Work by Parichay Foundation (2016)
