= Shahar Vikas Aghadi =

Shahar Vikas Aghadi (City Development Front) is a name that has been used by several local political parties and groupings in the Indian state of Maharashtra.

Groups include Shahar Vikas Aghadi in Mira-Bhayendar (existed in 2003), Shahar Vikas Aghadi in Jalgaon (existed in 2002, formed by Nationalist Congress Party leader Sureshdada Jain), Pune Shahar Vikas Aghadi in Pune and Wai Shahar Vikas Aghadi in Wai (existed in 1998).

One group is founded by Sunil More and in April 2023, along with 9 other Satana councillors, he joined the Bharatiya Janata Party. One group of Sawada Vikas Aghadi was deregistered by the State Election Commission in April 2016 while another group's (Shahar Vikas Aghadi, Dondaicha) registration was not extended in August 2016. Earlier in December 2011, the Shahar Vikas Aghadi led by NCP and Congress won in Talegaon Dabhade.
