= Viken (surname) =

Viken is a Norwegian surname that may refer to

- Gunnar Viken (born 1948), Norwegian conservative politician
- Jeffrey L. Viken (born 1952), American judge
- Tore Viken Holvik (born 1988), Norwegian snowboarder
- Tove Kari Viken (1942–2016), politician of the Norwegian Centre Party
