= Bika (surname) =

Bika may refer to the following people:

- John Bika (died 1989), Bougainvillean politician
- Obert Bika (born 1993), Papua New Guinean football midfielder
- Rao Bika, 15th century founder of the Indian city and principality of Bikaner
- Sakio Bika (born 1979), Cameroonian-Australian boxer
- Victor Nendaka Bika (1923–2002), Congolese politician
