= Vigen Zeinali =

Iranian Armenian footballer

Personal information
- Place of birth: Tehran, Iran

Senior career*
Years	Team	Apps	(Gls)
- Ararat Tehran
- Esteghlal Tehran
- * Club domestic league appearances and goals

Vigen Zeinali (Persian: ویگن زینعلی; born in Tehran) is a retired Iranian Armenian football player who played for Ararat Tehran and Esteghlal Tehran. He currently living in California
