= 1971 Odisha cyclone =

North Indian Ocean cyclone in 1971

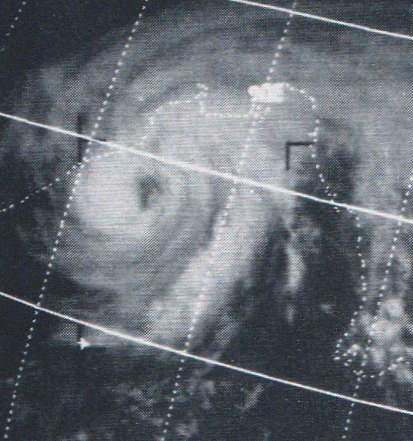
- 1971 Odisha cyclone, pictured by ESSA 9 weather satellite

Meteorological history
- Formed: 27 October 1971
- Dissipated: 31 October 1971

Extremely severe cyclonic storm
- 3-minute sustained (IMD)
- Highest winds: 165 km/h (105 mph)
- Lowest pressure: 966 hPa (mbar); 28.53 inHg

Category 3-equivalent tropical cyclone
- 1-minute sustained (SSHWS/JTWC)
- Highest winds: 185 km/h (115 mph)

Overall effects
- Fatalities: ≥10,000 total
- Areas affected: India and East Pakistan (present-day Bangladesh)
- Part of the 1971 North Indian Ocean cyclone season

The 1971 Odisha cyclone was a devastating tropical cyclone that struck the Indian state of Odisha (known as Orissa at the time) on 29 October 1971. The cyclone also affected the Indian state of West Bengal as well as East Pakistan (present-day Bangladesh), which had been devastated by the 1970 Bhola cyclone just less than a year prior and was in the middle of Bangladesh Liberation War.

== Meteorological history ==
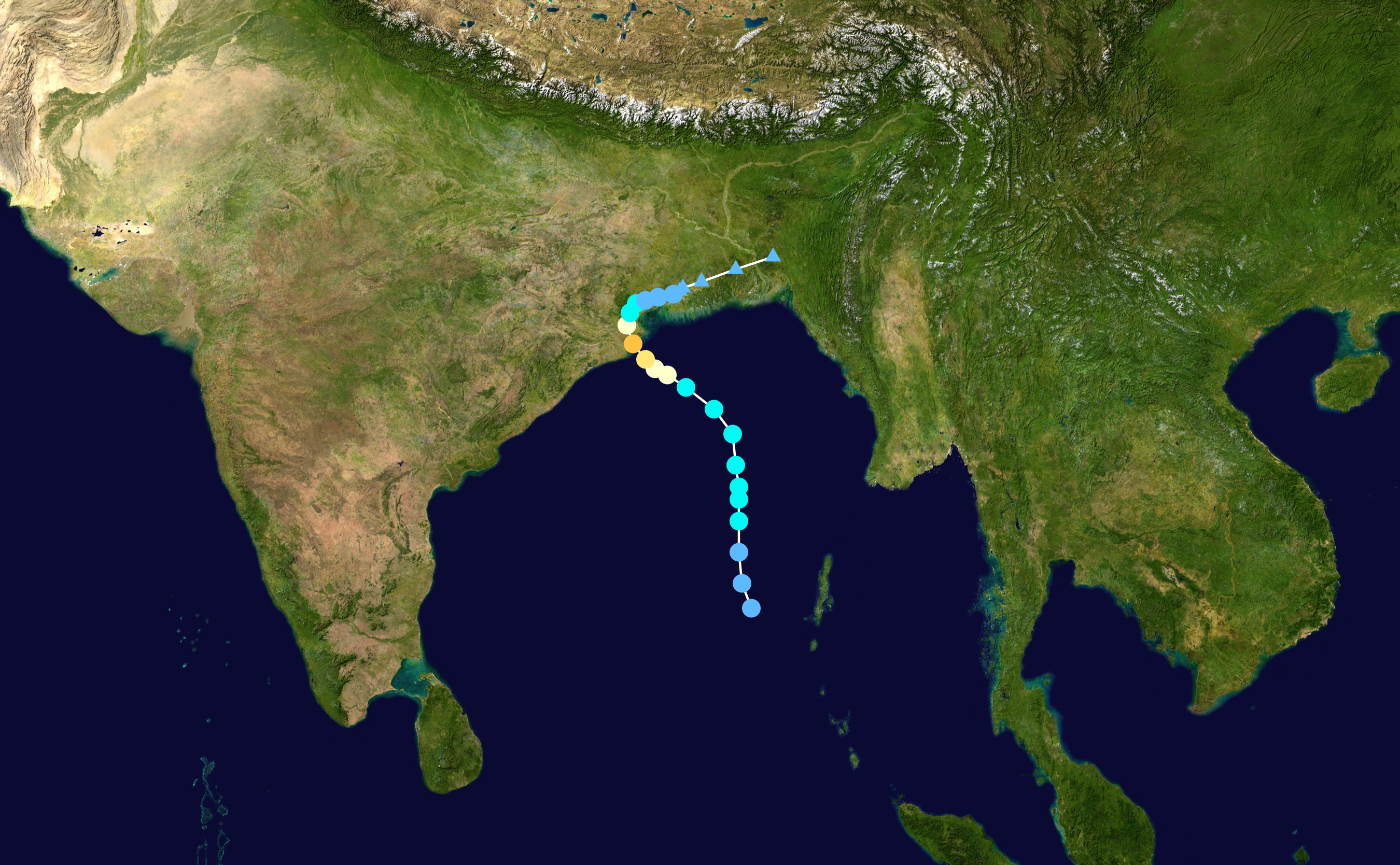
Map plotting the storm's track and intensity, according to the Saffir–Simpson scale Map key Saffir–Simpson scale Tropical depression (≤38 mph, ≤62 km/h) Tropical storm (39–73 mph, 63–118 km/h) Category 1 (74–95 mph, 119–153 km/h) Category 2 (96–110 mph, 154–177 km/h) Category 3 (111–129 mph, 178–208 km/h) Category 4 (130–156 mph, 209–251 km/h) Category 5 (≥157 mph, ≥252 km/h) Unknown Storm type Tropical cyclone Subtropical cyclone Extratropical cyclone, remnant low, tropical disturbance, or monsoon depression

This tropical cyclone formed on 26 October. Within few hours after its formation, due to the presence of highly favorable conditions, the cyclone underwent rapid intensification, becoming an extremely severe cyclonic storm and Category 3 equivalent cyclone in one and three minute mean windspeeds on 29 October. At the time, the storm's central pressure was 966 hPa. At its peak intensity, the storm made landfall on the coast of Odisha near Paradip early on the morning of 30 October and weakened the same day. It then curved northeast and dissipated on 31 October.

== Impact ==
The storm surge flooded low lying areas of the Odisha coast, resulting in more than 10,000 deaths and killing 50,000 cattle. Hundreds of thousands of trees were uprooted. The cyclone destroyed more than 800,000 houses. Communications and power lines were cut for days, preventing news of the disaster from reaching the outside world. Coastal districts of Odisha such as Bhadrak, Balasore, Cuttack and Jagatsinghpur were widely affected by this cyclone, since gusts were recorded to be up to 175 kph (108-110mph) there.

The cyclone crossed the Odisha coast near Paradip and was classified as a very severe cyclonic storm. Water levels reached as high as 6 m in some areas, while the storm surge penetrated approximately 5 km inland and up to 25 km along rivers. More than one million people were left homeless, and about 3.3 million acres of crops were destroyed. More than 10,000 educational institutions were also destroyed, while several thousand government buildings sustained damage. Hundreds of miles of roads and embankments, as well as irrigation works and other infrastructure, were damaged.

== See also ==
- 1999 Odisha cyclone
- 1970 Bhola cyclone
- Cyclone Hudhud
- Cyclone Phailin
- Cyclone Fani
- Cyclone Amphan
