= Nisardin =

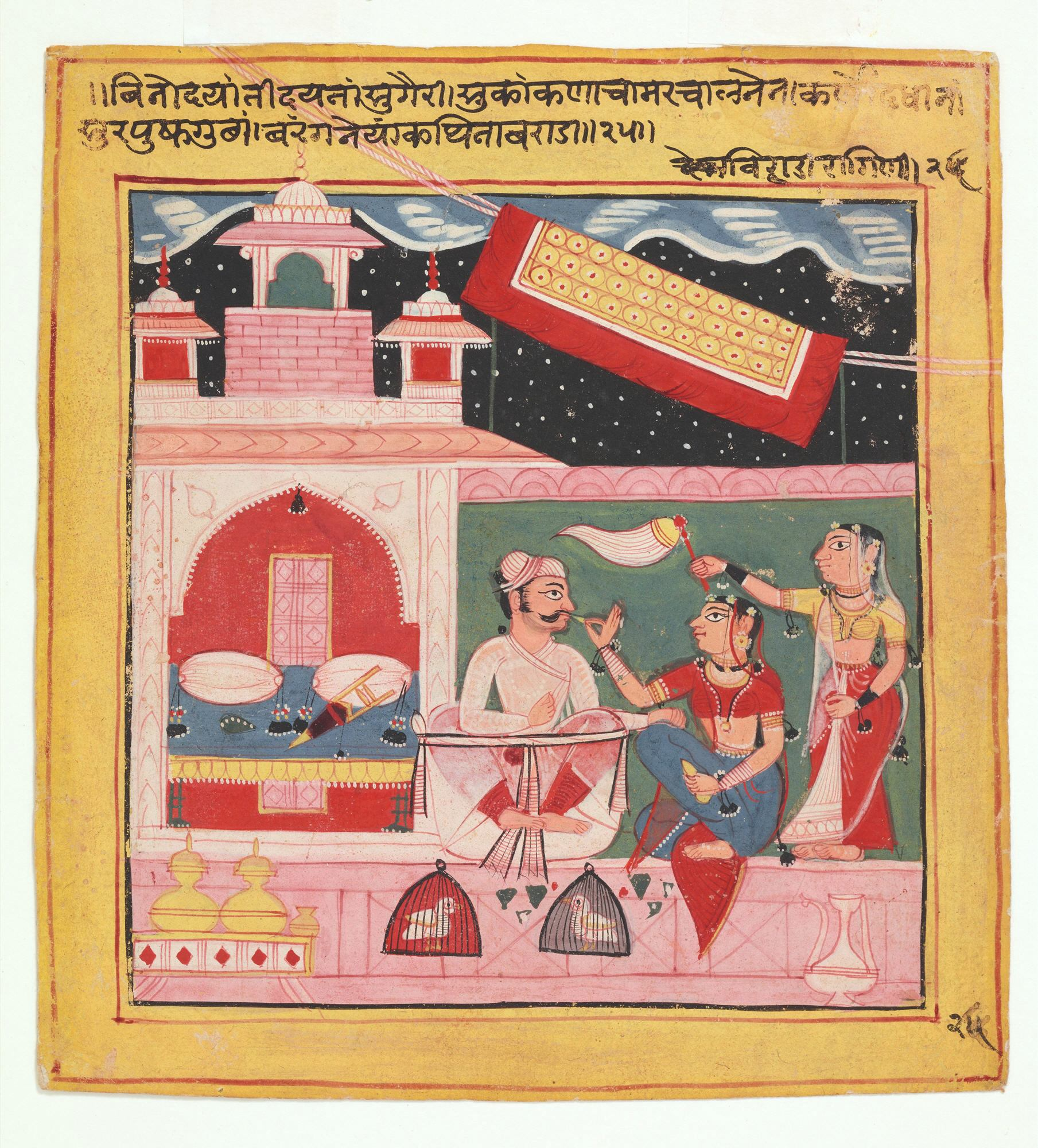
Miniature from the Ragamala set painted by Nisardin. Rietberg Museum

Nisardin (fl. 1585–1609, also known as Nasiruddin) was an artist who is credited to have painted the earliest dated set of Rajasthani miniature paintings, called Chawand Ragamala. It is uncertain if he belonged to the same family as Sahibdin who is also known as a miniature artist from the same era. Chawand Ragamala is dated to 1605 and is so named because the set was created in Chawand village, in present day Rajasthan. The set was probably patronized by Rana Pratap Singh or his son Amar Singh who was living in exile in Chawand.

The set is inscribed and clearly states the name of the artist.
