= Rajni Perera =

Canadian artist (born 1985)

- Born: 1985 (age 40–41); Colombo, Sri Lanka
- Education: OCAD University
- Known for: Painting and sculpture

Rajni Perera (born 1985) is a Sri Lankan-Canadian multidisciplinary artist. She is known for drawing from wide-ranging imagery such as science fiction, Indian miniature paintings, and medieval armor in her work to explore themes of gender and identity.

== Biography ==
Born in Sri Lanka, Perera was raised in Sri Lanka, Australia, and Canada. Through British, American, and Japanese programming on television in Sri Lanka, she saw the animated series Robotech, the work of Hayao Miyazaki, and American science fiction. While obtaining a B.F.A. at OCAD University in Toronto, she began exploring miniaturist painting and influences outside of the canon taught at OCAD. She graduated from OCAD with a Medal for Drawing and Painting in 2011.

She blends science fiction influences with other reference points, such as Indian miniaturist art. Some of her later work, particularly The Traveller series (2019), reflects her view of immigrants as resilient people. She has researched the technology of clothing and emphasized her painted figures' futuristic clothes as a form of protective armour.

In 2016, Perera illustrated a children's book by Vivek Shraya, The Boy & the Bindi.

The Robert McLaughlin Gallery received the York Wilson Endowment Award from the Canada Arts Council in 2019 to purchase Perera's Banner for New Empire 1.

She was the Koerner Artist-in-Residence in the Queen's University at Kingston Visual Art BFA Program in 2022.

Her personal fashion has featured in Vogue and Toronto Life. She lives and works in Toronto.

== Exhibitions ==
Perera's work has been exhibited at the McMichael Canadian Art Collection (Kleinburg, 2022); Tramway (Glasgow, 2020); Fondation Phi pour l'art contemporain (Montreal, 2020); the Robert McLaughlin Gallery (Oshawa, 2020); Festival Chromatic (Montreal, 2019); the MacKenzie Art Gallery (Regina, 2019) (with Nep Sidhu); the Museum of Contemporary Art Toronto Canada (Toronto, 2018); Gallery 44 (Toronto, 2018); Art Metropole (Toronto, 2017); the Art Gallery of York University (Toronto, 2017); Ota Fine Arts (Tokyo, 2017); the Colombo Art Biennale (Colombo, 2016); SCOPE Basel (Basel, 2016); Art League Houston (Houston, 2014); and elsewhere.

She participated in Rajni Perera and Marigold Santos: Efflorescence/The Way We Wake, produced and circulated by the PHI Foundation for Contemporary Art in Montreal and shown in New York at The Armory Show and in Calgary at Contemporary Calgary.

She is represented by Patel-Brown Gallery in Toronto, Galerie Hugues Charbonneau in Montreal, and Saskia Fernando Gallery in Colombo.

== Awards and honours ==
- Sobey Art Award, Ontario region finalist, 2021
- MOCA Artist Award, 2022
- The Armory Show Sauer Art Prize, 2023
