= Club Quarantine =

Virtual gay club based in Toronto, Canada

Club Quarantine Logo

Club Quarantine (Club Q) is a virtual gay club based in Toronto that began hosting URL (online) parties in early 2020 during the COVID-19 pandemic. Created by four friends, recording artist Ceréna Sierra, DJ Casey MQ, comedian Brad Allen, and digital creative Mingus New, Club Q began by hosting parties on Zoom in March 2020. In Ontario, full closures of all non-essential businesses were recommended by the province on March 16 2020. Club Q's first online event took place on that same Monday, March 16, 2020, with a modest 12 attendees. The Club Q Zoom event on March 17, 2020 featured a spontaneous live stick-and-poke session where a virtual club-goer got a tattoo reading "Club Q". Later online events often saw 1,000 attendees. By April 2020, Club Q had partnered with PAPER magazine (a collaboration called PAPER x Club Quarantine) to host a series of events. Club Q hosted their first IRL (real life) - as opposed to URL) event for Halloween 2021 at a membership based co-working space called Eastroom in Toronto where 700 people attended. The IRL halloween event was called "Literally Dead" and was also live streamed to a Zoom audience.

== Performances and events ==
=== April 2020 ===
On April 3 2020, Club Q celebrated the birthday of Chester Lockhart who hosted the party on Zoom. Performers at the April 3 online event included Dorian Electra, Charli XCX, Abhora, Santi Storm, HANA, Allie X, Alice Glass, and That Kid.

Club Q on April 8 2020 featured performances by Pabllo Vittar; DJS Nídia, Mazurbate (Matthew Mazur), and DJ MINAS; and Drag performers Rify Royalty and Louisiana Purchase.

On April 15 2020, Club Q featured a live DJ set by Rebecca Black (of Friday fame), who had recently come out as queer. Javiera Mena, Sateen, Himera, and Allysin Chaynes also performed at the 3-hour virtual event.

On April 22, 2020, Mike Thornwell hosted the virtual party. Victoria Monét was a guest DJ, in celebration of her newest single at the time, "Dive". Gia Woods, Dana Dentata, MEATY, Nar, JayJay Kings and Dinah Jane performed at the April 22 event as well. The night also featured a surprise performance from Nasty Cherry.

Brendan Jordan hosted Club Q on April 29, 2020, where Big Freedia, Uffie, Aluna (of AlunaGeorge), Messer (Mitch Grassi), Casey MQ, Edge Slayer, and drag performers Junior Mint and Paris L'Hommie performed.

=== June 2020 ===
Lady Gaga performed at Club Q via Zoom in June 2020, dedicating her performance to Marsha P. Johnson.

== Events by the same name ==
American DJ D-Nice also created an online party by the same name in March 2020 that saw over 100,000 people attend virtually via Instagram Live, including celebrities like Kylie Jenner, Rihanna, and Missy Elliott. DJ D-Nice's Club Quarantine played largely hip-hop and rap music, while the Canadian Club Q plays a wide variety of music genres including hyperpop.
