= Indian miniature paintings =

Small, colorful, and detailed Indian paintings

Indian miniature paintings are a class of paintings originating from India. Made on canvases a few inches in length and width, the Indian miniatures are noted for the amount of details that the artist encapsulates within the minute canvas frame; and the characteristic sensitivity with which the human, divine and natural forms are portrayed.

They depict a variety of topics such as legends and myths, human passions and pains, aspirations, and physicality. From their origins in cave paintings, to the later Mughal and Pahari schools, the Indian miniatures represent a diversity of styles and themes, varying between the religious and the secular. Today most of these forms have perished, and are no longer practiced, due to the decline in royal patronage, and subsequent changes in the country's socio-cultural scenes. However, several of these canvases today survive in museums and private collections, defining India, her lifestyle and the aesthetic idiom of her past, as well as the essence of her soil, her creative imagination, colours, and thought.

== History of Indian Painting ==
In India, painting, one of the significant branches of chitra, has a divine origin. It is said to have emerged as a spontaneous act by Vishnu, who unconsciously sketched a portrait of Urvashi on his thigh, enthralled by the ravishing beauty of the apsara. It was then passed on to Viswakarma, who taught the art of painting to the rest of mankind as per Vishnu's wishes. Chitra has several connotations, and forms an important part of the various Shilpa and the Agamas text. The earliest paintings, as per anthropological evidences have been found in the rock-cut shelters such as in Bhim-Betaka in Bhopal. Seven distinct phases of rock art have been discovered here, with the earliest dating back to 10,000 B.C. Indus pottery defines the next stage of painting where the surfaces of earthen pots became the artist's canvas, these paintings were characterised by geometrical patterns, bright colours, floral themes, etc. The two epics Ramayana and Mahabharata provide depict several of the characters engaged in art activities. For instance, in Ayodhya, there was a permanent space designated as chitra-vithi, which was supervised by Lakshmana, the brother of Ram. In Bhagavata Purana, Banasura's daughter, Usha has a friend, Chitralekha, who is a skilled painter who painted Aniruddha, Krishna's grandson, after hearing about Usha's dream about him. The most glorious phase of Indian art spanned from the 4th-7th Centuries as seen in the delicate and exquisite murals at Ajanta Ellora caves, temples, monasteries, etc.

== Evolution of Miniature Paintings ==
This form of painting, in the Indian subcontinent, emerged during the 10th Century. The earliest known example is the 999 A.D.-illustrated Buddhist text Prajnaparamita, produced on a palm leaf. There are also the Kalpasutra folios which have been discovered during the 10th-14th centuries. The Kalpasutra tradition seems to have continued till 16th Century. These votive portable paintings earned the patronage of travelers, devotees and traders. The Mandu Kalpasutra, for instance, dated 1439 A.D., was rendered for Mandu, a Jain monk. The introduction of paper replaced the palm-leaf and revolutionised the art-scenario post-14th Century. Moreover, new mineral colours and pigments too were introduced in addition to the prior colours. Paper was tougher, smoother, and had a better colour-absorbing surface. Meanwhile, the Bhakti movement increased the demand for votive representations, while simultaneously rulers too began patronising painters to have their artistic styles preserved and reflected on the canvas. Against this scenario, the production of miniatures became profit-oriented, and artists began to carve their own distinctions while competing with others. This also gave birth to various art schools, marking a shift from the religious to secular themes, and feudal lords replaced the traders as patrons. The major chunk of miniatures, and consequent medieval art forms, evolved from the 15th to the 19th century.

== Essence of Indian Miniatures ==
The Indian miniatures are characterised by a direct expressive quality, and remarkable transparency where lines, colours, forms, etc., synthesize to expose all that is depicted in the canvas. Nothing is concealed and it is this frankness that potentially moves the viewers, emotionally, and generates a transcendental delight in them. Several Indian texts ranging from the Buddhist Jatakas, Jain Kalpasutras, the two Hindu epics, Bhagavata-Purana, Kalidasa's Shakuntala, Rasamanjari, Gita-Govinda by Jayadeva, Rasikapriya, Bihari-Satsai, and Janamsakhi are frequently portrayed in these miniatures. Persian texts like Shahnama, Tutinama, Hamzanama, Mughal memoirs like Baburnama, Akbarnama, etc., folk legends like Bazbahadur-Roopmati, Dhola-Maru, Laila-Majnun, Nala-Damayanti, Panchatantra, etc., are also the staple content of Indian miniatures. Abstract emotions of love, pain and grief; beauty and nature; the Ragamalas, Baramasa, Tantra; history of court and village lives, various festivals and scenes of pleasure too are found in these paintings. Calligraphy played a significant role from the Buddhist and Jain depictions in the medieval age; while portraiture was encouraged by Akbar though only of male royal personages, while Jahangir allowed portraits of royal females such as Nur Jahan. Nature played a very important role in these paintings, and despite the minute space, the expansive detailing seemed to seamlessly unite the world of nature and man on the canvas space. Decorated borders, intricate lines, balanced and perfectly executed compositions, unique shades and colour palettes, scenic depictions, and thematic portrayals depart a mysticism and emotive appeal that characterises the essence of Indian miniatures.

== Schools and Art Styles ==
The Pala and Jain schools comprise the early miniature styles, while the later schools comprise the Rajasthani, Mughal, Pahari, and Deccan schools. Malwa, Raghogarh, and Orchha-Datia, often grouped under the Rajasthani school, form separate schools of Central India. Depending on stylistic variations, the Mughal miniatures can be further classified into the early, later and provincial Mughal schools, with the last referring to the art styles that emerged in the subas. On the other hand, Kangra, Basohli, Garhwal, etc., form different sub-schools of the Pahari miniature style.

The paintings of the Pala school were produced in Bengal and the surrounding areas, and depict narratives, events, and tales from the life of Buddha. These paintings, composed on palm-leaf manuscripts, were created during the 8th-11th Century, under the patronage of Pala rulers. The Jain-Kalpasutra paintings depict the life of the Thirthankara Mahavira and Parashvanath. These paintings of the Jain school are made on palm-leaf or on cloth, and are characterised by short-statured men with deep protruding eyes, angular facial features, pointed noses, bright ornaments, and costumes, painted in gold, warm colours with active lines, connoting a distinct rhythm and vitality of movement.

The principal centres of Rajasthani miniatures included Mewar, Bundi, Bikaner, Jodhpur, Kishangarh, Jaipur, over fifteen smaller states, and thikanas. The Rajasthani miniatures are exceptionally expressive, characterised by primitive vigour, and exude the rich fragrant essence of the soil and the land. Serialised illustrations of texts and legends, depictions of Durbar scenes, festivals, processions, huntings, and harem life, have precedence over portraiture. The image of Krishna-Radha gave the Rajasthani painters an eternal source of sensuous delight, an ideal of the shringara rasa, and a way to transcend beyond the material into the spiritual.

Mewar paintings developed a sensitive portrayal of Hindu myths and legends. Sahibdin, a Muslim artist, interestingly pioneered the Mewar idiom. Nathdwara became an important centre of Mewar art. This was the result of the establishment of the Shreenathji shrine here. Soon, the image of Shreenath became a dominant theme in these paintings. The Kotah paintings excelled in the depictions of hunting scenes, realistic portrayals of nature, and human figures. The Bundi miniatures too are superbly composed and reflect both secular as well as religious themes. The Bikaner miniatures are characterised by their affinity to the Mughal style, their portrayals of the Durbar scenes, delicate female forms and robust male figures. Art from Jodhpur, also known as the Marwar style, is defined by large thick eyes on well-defined physical features. The Kishangarh artists championed the Bani-Thani figures, that is the perfect model of womanhood, and were inspired by Raja Sawant Singh. A unique lyricism, elegance and rhythm characterise these masterpieces. The Jaipur style is distinguished by the presence of tall figures, with delicate eyes, ornate background, embellished costumes, etc., achieved by the amalgamation of Mughal and Rajasthani styles. The Malwa miniatures are beautifully composed and emotionally charged, while the Orchha-Datia styles (also, known as the Bundelkhand school) are dominated by episodes from the Ramayana, Bhagavata-Purana, folk narratives, and blue-black shades.

The Mughal art style was born in the hands of Akbar, whose liberalism led to the unification of Hindu and Islamic elements of art. His court saw the translations of Persian and Sanskrit texts, and illustrations of the same were carried on simultaneously. Miniatures produced during Jahangir's time testify to his sensitive eye for beauty. The paintings have a poetic fervour, neat lines, life-like portrayals of birds, and animals, etc. The influence of European styles too are visible in the paintings of this time owing to Jahangir's interactions with the Europeans. Portraiture and random depictions gained immense popularity during Shah Jahan's time. Serialisation of romances like Dara Sikhoh and Ranadil were significant in the miniatures of this period. Shah Jahan was a man of romantic and poetic fervour, and the paintings produced under his patronage show a delicate and typical softness. The Mughal miniature artists shifted to the subas with the ascendance of Aurangzeb, under whose rigid rule patronage was suspended, and all art was abhorred. The paintings which developed in the subas were referred to as the Provincial Mughal Miniatures.

In Deccan, a fresh art style had started to develop, after areas of Deccan were conquered by Islamic rulers who brought them with their art styles, that mingled with the indigenous art forms alongside the influences from Persia and Turkey. Some of the distinct markers of this school are the exceptional synthesis of colour palette, the comely human figures, rich decorations, and indigenous ornamental patterns, etc.

The Pahari miniature style developed at various centres spread across the lower Himalayan regions and Punjab hills. The major centres were Basohli, Guler, Chamba, Mandi, and Kangra, while the minor ones included those at Jammu, Bilaspur, Garhwal and Punjab. Pahari paintings derive their timelessness and emotive quality from the compositional details, rich symbolism, sensitive portrayals of humans, and natural landscapes. They have an unmatched serenity, and picturesque quality. The Basohli style is marked by the indiscriminate use of the lotus symbol, and human figures with large eyes, and broad foreheads. Royal portraits of the Chamba sub-school are well known. It is also noted for its unique technique of mixing colours, and representation of womenfolk. Guler style is defined by rounded faces, refined lines, and a sensitive depictions of nature. Kangra paintings represent the pinnacle of Pahari miniatures, and Himalayan art, characterised by mature technical finesse, and portraitural quality that imparts an almost pulsating softness of music, emotions, and colours. The Radha-Krishna legend forms the primary theme of the Kangra school.
