= God Loves Hair =

Short story collection by Vivek Shraya

- Author: Vivek Shraya
- Illustrator: Juliana Neufeld
- Language: English
- Subject: Young adult literature, Gay male teen fiction, Gender identity, Short story collection
- Published: 2014 (Arsenal Pulp Press)
- Publication place: Canada
- Media type: Print (paperback)
- Pages: 110
- ISBN: 9781551525433
- OCLC: 864394858
- Originally self-published in 2010.

God Loves Hair is a collection of 21 short stories by Vivek Shraya with illustrations by Juliana Neufeld. The collections tells the stories of a child of Indian immigrants growing up in Canada. Originally self-published in 2010 it was a finalized for the Lambda Literary Award. In 2014 it was rereleased by Arsenal Pulp Press. In 2020 a hardcover 10th anniversary edition which includes a new story, new illustrations and a foreword by writer Cherie Dimaline.

== Reception ==
Both Booklist and Quill & Quire gave God Loves Hair starred reviews with Booklist writing "The highly visual nature of the stories is enhanced by artist Neufeld's full-page color illustrations, which accompany each selection. [...] A book for all ages, this will be especially welcomed by contemporary genderqueer youth and twentysomethings, who will see themselves in these vividly realized pages." and Quill & Quire calling it "a rich and powerful exploration of gender, sexuality, religion, race, and the desire to fit in."

The Bulletin of the Center for Children's Books highlighted the synergy of Shraya and Neufeld; "There is clear collaborative effort between the author and the illustrator, Neufeld, and the drawings are indeed one of the strongest elements, sharpening what are occasionally long passages into one searing image that captures the same tone." and concluded "This may resonate most with older teens who may have also seen enough glimpses of life beyond high school to fully appreciate the evolution of the trapped, bullied kid represented to the sharp, poetic man who remembers being him."

God Loves Hair has also been reviewed by Publishers Weekly, the School Library Journal, Kirkus Reviews, The Gazette, and CM: Canadian Review of Materials.

== Stories ==
The stories in God Loves Hair are:

God Loves Hair
Bed Humper
Lipstick
Dress Up
Sridevi
Pervert
Dear Vishnu
Girls Are Mothers and Sisters
Es Ee Ex
Colour Purple
Girls Are Dangerous
Gaylord!
Bubble Butt
Moustache
Girls Get Pregnant
Sundays
God Lives in India
Dirty Thoughts
Suicide Jeans
Eyebrows
God is Half Man Half Woman.
