= The Boy & the Bindi =

2016 children's picture book

- Author: Vivek Shraya
- Illustrator: Rajni Perera
- Language: English
- Subject: Children's book, Hindu culture, Cultural norms
- Published: 2016 (Arsenal Pulp Press)
- Publication place: Canada
- Media type: Print (hardcover)
- Pages: 32 (unpaginated)
- ISBN: 9781551526683
- OCLC: 938996631

The Boy & the Bindi is a 2016 children's picture book by Vivek Shraya and illustrated by Rajni Perera. It is about a young boy's obsession with his mother's bindi and his experiences when he wears one.

== Reception ==
The School Library Journal in a review of The Boy & the Bindi wrote "Shraya (God Loves Hair) makes her picture book debut with gentle rhymes and warm whimsy, amplified by Toronto artist Perara’s richly hued illustrations. The author, a transgender woman, deftly explores difference and self-acceptance, the subversion of gender expectations, and the power of “making sure I don’t hide/Everything I am inside.”" and Booklist stated "Suitable as a gentle introduction to Hindu culture, this simple reflection will complement multicultural collections. The beautiful and detailed illustrations, such as those of Ammi's traditional dress and jewelry, provide additional cultural context."

CM: Canadian Review of Materials was concerned with the apparent awkwardness of the rhyming text but commended the illustrations.

The Boy & the Bindi has also been reviewed by Publishers Weekly, and Kirkus Reviews.
