= Vivek Shraya =

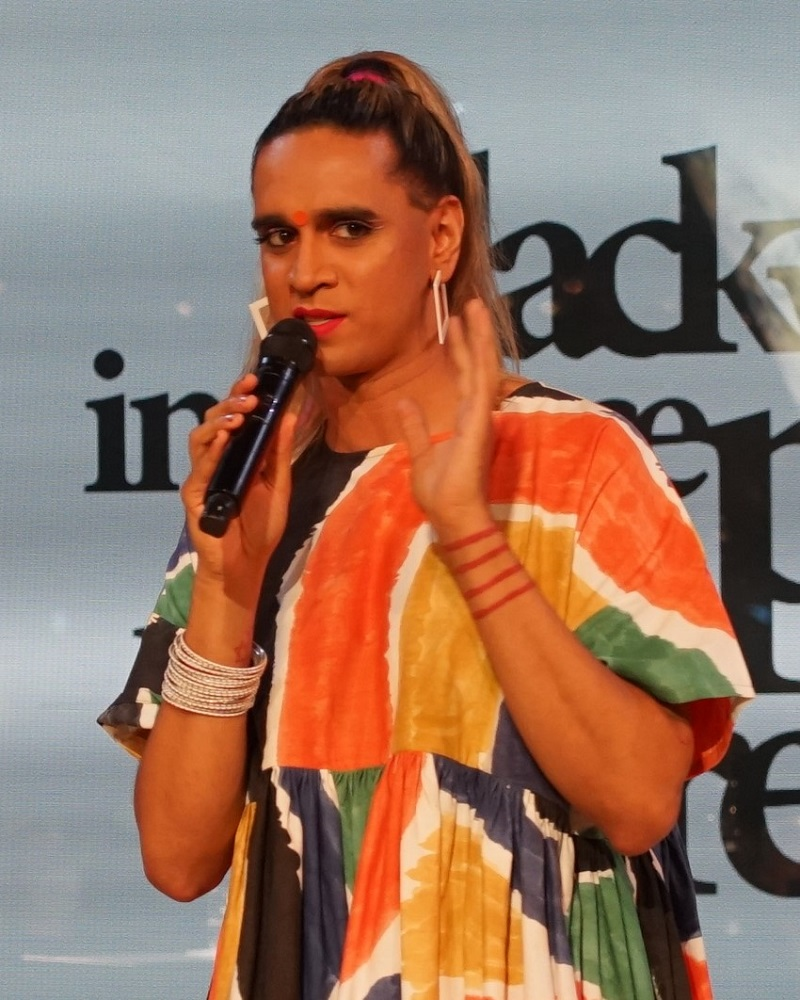
- Shraya in 2021

Background information
- Genres: Electro, dance, rock
- Occupations: Musician, writer, visual artist
- Label: Skinsongs
- Website: vivekshraya.com

Vivek Shraya is a Canadian musician, writer, and visual artist. She is a seven-time Lambda Literary Award finalist and was named a "great Canadian filmmaker of the future" by CBC Arts in 2017.

Shraya founded her publishing imprint VS. Books to give mentorship and publishing opportunities to emerging writers who are Black, Indigenous, and people of colour.

Shraya is also on the board of directors of the Tegan and Sara Foundation, which fights for health, economic justice, and representation for LGBTQ women.

How to Fail as a Popstar, a web series adapted from her stage play and book of the same name, premiered in 2023 on CBC Gem.

== Career ==
=== Music ===
Shraya began writing songs at the age of 13 and released her first album, THROAT, in 2002. Since then, she has released several solo albums in a range of genres, including If We're Not Talking (2007), Keys & Machines (2009), and 1:1 (2011). Shraya has also created two albums, Bronze (2015) and Angry (2018), with her band, Too Attached, which she and her brother, Shamik Bilgi, formed in 2015. She has toured extensively in North America, both as a solo artist and with Too Attached, sharing the stage with Tegan and Sara, Team Dresch, Dragonette, Melissa Ferrick, and Bonjay.

Shraya's 2017 album, Part-Time Woman, a collaboration with the Queer Songbook Orchestra, was named one of the 17 best Canadian albums of 2017 by CBC Arts and longlisted for the 2018 Polaris Music Prize.

Shraya composed music for the television series Sort Of. Alongside Emily Persich, Moël, Terrell Morris, Shan Vincent de Paul, and Ceréna, she won the Canadian Screen Award for Best Original Music in a Comedy Series at the 11th Canadian Screen Awards in 2023.

=== Writing ===
In 2010, Shraya published her first book, God Loves Hair, an collection of 21 linked short stories about a brown, genderqueer child growing up in immigrant family in Alberta, illustrated by Juliana Neufeld. God Loves Hair was nominated for a 2011 Lambda Literary Award for Children's and Young Adult Literature. Shraya's second book, She of the Mountains, a lyrical novel consisting of two intertwined love stories, was named one of The Globe and Mail's Best 100 Books of 2014 and nominated for a 2015 Lambda Literary Award for Transgender Fiction. Shraya was awarded an honour of distinction at the 2015 Dayne Ogilvie Prize.

In 2016, Shraya released her debut poetry collection, even this page is white, an exploration of the effects of everyday racism and colonialism in Canada, which won the 2017 Publishing Triangle Award for Trans and Gender-Variant Literature award and was longlisted for CBC's Canada Reads. The Boy & the Bindi, a children's picture book written by Shraya and illustrated by Rajni Perera about a young boy's fascination with his mother's bindi, was also published in 2016.

In 2017, Shraya partnered with Arsenal Pulp Press to create an imprint, VS. Books. VS. Books supports young writers of colour by providing mentorship throughout the writing and editing processes and publishing a book by a different emerging artist every year. The first VS. title, Téa Mutonji's short story collection Shut Up You're Pretty, was published in 2019.

Shraya's first non-fiction book, I’m Afraid of Men, was released in August 2018. Shraya's first graphic non-fiction work Death Threat was published by Arsenal Pulp Press in 2019. Ness Lee did the visual art for the book.

Shraya's second novel The Subtweet was published on April 7, 2020, by ECW Press. The book is focused on an intense friendship between two women of colour musicians. Quill & Quire reviewed The Subtweet in March 2020, concluding: "Shraya’s narrative pushes back against the ways mainstream and pop-culture formulations of social justice are used to further agendas misaligned with principles of equity. [...] The Subtweet attempts to nudge the reader toward a more critical perspective and to encourage the reader to be more skeptical of what comes out of the mouths of public figures, especially when money and politics are involved."

Shraya's 2022 book People Change was published by Penguin Random House and was included in CBC Books' list of "26 Canadian Books to Read for Pride Month".

Shraya's fourth book The Hystericals, was published on September 29, 2026, by Penguin Random House. It is a dystopian novel set in a world that has stripped women of their rights.

=== Other media ===
Shraya has created several short films that have screened at festivals across Canada and internationally.

Shraya made the film, Seeking Single White Male on August 1, 2010 (at this time, she had not yet come out as a trans woman). This film depicts a set of pictures of Shraya increasingly altering her features to those more associated with a white person. The images depict the bleaching of her brown hair to blonde in addition to the use of blue contact lenses over her brown eyes. In a post on her website two years after the film's release, Shraya shares that the purpose behind the film was "to show how the internalization of racism can manifest externally", and it has been analyzed as addressing "the existence of racialized conceptions of desirability within the gay community in Ontario". Seeking Single White Male has been shown in multiple screenings including the Vancouver Queer Film Festival in 2011 and the Toronto Inside Out Film and Video Festival in 2012.

In 2016, she released a photo series, Trisha, featuring old photos of her mother displayed alongside contemporary re-creations of the images with Shraya herself as the subject. This project has been shown in galleries across North America and a digital version has circulated internationally.

Shraya's first theatrical work debuted on February 18, 2020. The work is called How to Fail as a Popstar and dramatizes Shraya's attempt at becoming a pop star in the 2000s before finding greater success as a writer. It includes original songs written and performed by Shraya. She later released a book of the same name, and it was turned into a web series on CBC Gem in 2023.

In 2020, Shraya partnered with Pantene on their global Hair Has No Gender Project, highlighting the importance of hair in trans and non-binary people's identities and gender transitions. The campaign's film included a conversation about self-expression and familial support between Shraya and her father.

== Personal life ==
Shraya is bisexual. On February 15, 2016, she came out as transgender.

== Albums ==
- Samsara: The Sketches (2002)
- THROAT EP (2003)
- A Composite of Straight Lines (2005)
- If We're Not Talking (2007)
- Keys & Machines (2009)
- 1:1 (2011)
- Breathe Again: A Tribute to Babyface (2013)
- All of the Lights: A Diwali/Christmas EP (2014)
- Part Time Woman (2017)
- Baby, You're Projecting (2023)
- New Models (2025)
- VIVICA (2026)

== Books ==
- God Loves Hair (2010)
- She of the Mountains (2014)
- even this page is white (2016)
- The Boy & the Bindi (2016)
- I'm Afraid of Men (2018)
- Death Threat (2019)
- The Subtweet (2020)
- Next Time There's a Pandemic (2022)
- People Change (2022)
- The Hystericals (2026)
