= Ceréna =

Canadian pop and electronic musician

Ceréna is a Canadian pop and electronic musician. She is most noted for her single "see", which was a Juno Award nominee for Dance Recording of the Year at the Juno Awards of 2022.

Born in Toronto, Ontario, to immigrant parents from Colombia, Ceréna released music, including the full-length album House Arrest in 2018, as Andrés Sierra before coming out as transgender, and was one of the organizers of the Club Quarantine series of Zoom-based club nights for LGBTQ audiences during the COVID-19 pandemic. She released the album resurrection in 2021, and considers the album her true debut as it represents her first time making music as her full and true self.

She originally paid the full fee to submit her music for Juno consideration, only to have the organizers contact her and offer to refund the fee under its new submission access program to waive submission fees for new and emerging artists. She had also originally submitted only in the new Underground Dance Single of the Year category, only to be encouraged by the organizers to submit in the established dance category as well.

She has also composed music for the television series Sort Of. Alongside Emily Persich, Moël, Terrell Morris, Shan Vincent de Paul and Vivek Shraya, she won the Canadian Screen Award for Best Original Music in a Comedy Series at the 11th Canadian Screen Awards in 2023.
