= She of the Mountains =

2014 book by Vivek Shraya

- Author: Vivek Shraya
- Illustrator: Raymond Biesinger
- Language: English
- Subject: Young adult literature, Gay male teen fiction, Gender identity, Hindu mythology
- Published: 2014 (Arsenal Pulp Press)
- Publication place: Canada
- Media type: Print (paperback)
- Pages: 152
- ISBN: 9781551525600
- OCLC: 937059761

She of the Mountains is a 2014 novel by Vivek Shraya that interweaves a story of the Hindu deities, Parvati, Shiva and Ganesh with a queer Hindu boy growing up in Canada.

== Reception ==
Quill & Quire in a starred review of She of the Mountains wrote "Vivek Shraya seamlessly blends a lyrical interpretation of Hindu mythology with a contemporary coming-of-age tale. .. Studded with abstract illustrations by Raymond Biesinger, Shraya’s book is accessible, yet complex. "

She of the Mountains has also been reviewed by Publishers Weekly, Kirkus Reviews, and The Globe and Mail.
