= Brenna Jordan =

YouTuber and model

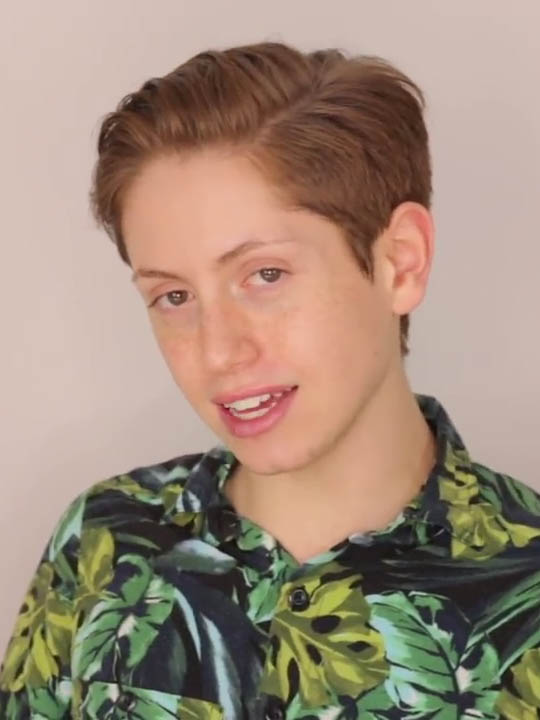
- Born: Brendan Jordan; September 25, 1999 (age 27); Las Vegas, Nevada, U.S.
- Occupations: YouTuber; model

YouTube information
- Channel: Brenna Jordan
- Years active: 2014–present
- Genres: LGBT; drag; makeup
- Subscribers: 250 thousand
- Views: 1.8 million
- Last updated: April 8, 2026

Brenna Jordan (born Brendan Jordan; September 25, 1999) is a American YouTuber and model. In October 2014, Jordan went viral after dancing to Lady Gaga's "Applause" music video in the background of a live broadcast on KLAS-TV, the CBS affiliate in Las Vegas, Nevada.

== Biography ==
On October 9, 2014, KLAS 8 News Now filmed Jordan in the background of their live coverage of the opening of Downtown Summerlin. While being filmed, Jordan reproduced the dance moves from the "Applause" music video from Lady Gaga, released two months earlier. The next day, Lady Gaga tweeted that she "liked [him]", while the drag community, including RuPaul and Pandora Boxx, actively shared the video. The video was also widely diffused by media outlets such as Today and ABC News.

In October 2014, Jordan appeared on The Queen Latifah Show where she met Raven from RuPaul's Drag Race. In November 2014, she was a model for the American Apparel brand. She was chosen for how she used their platform to raise awareness towards the LGBTQ community.

== Personal life ==
In 2016, she came out as genderfluid and transgender, choosing to go by the name Brenna. She started medically transitioning in 2024.
