= Ragamala paintings =

Form of miniature painting

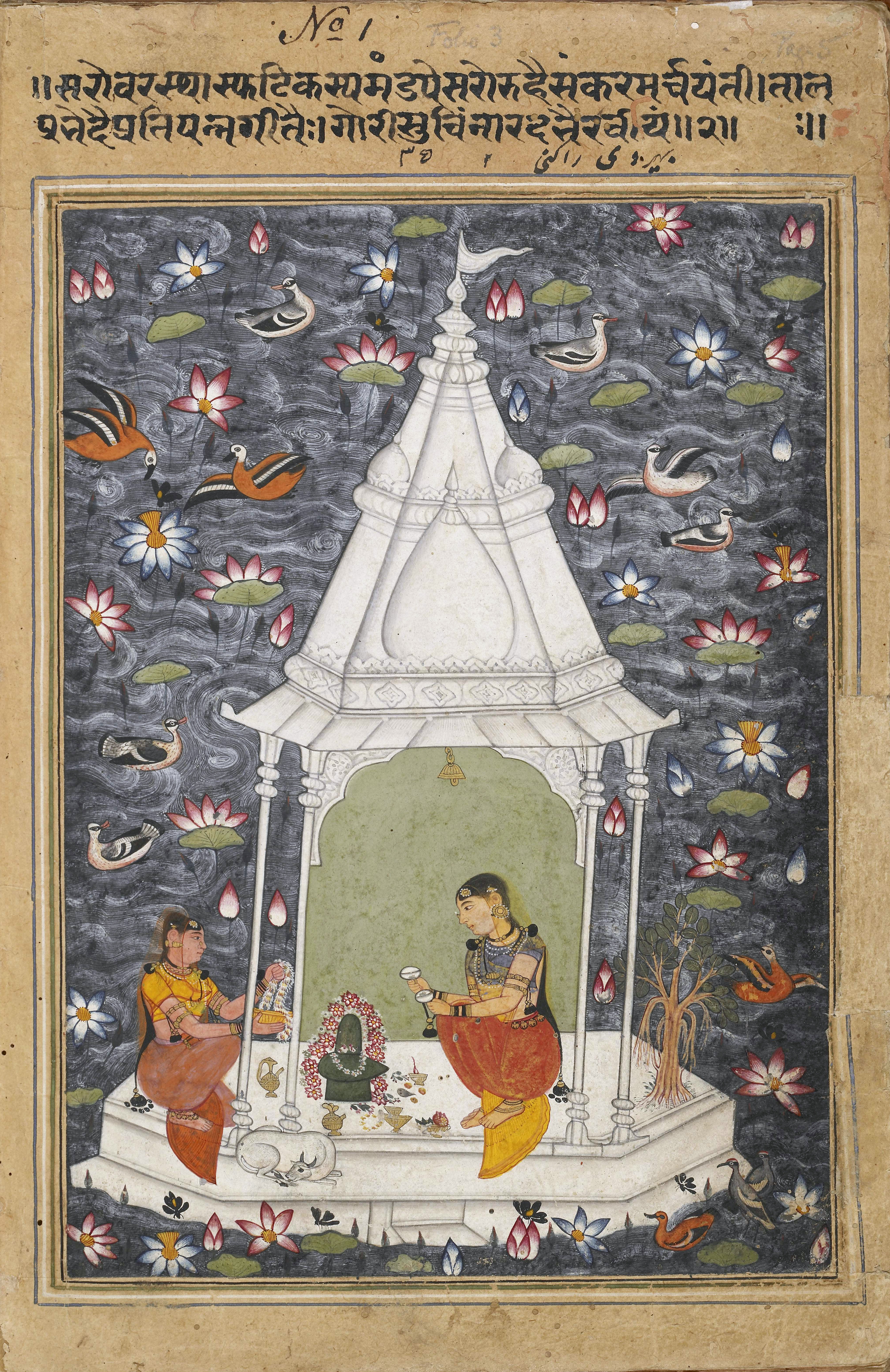
Bhairavi Ragini, folio from the Manley Ragamala. Probably Amber, c. 1610-1620. British Museum

Ragamala paintings are a form of Indian miniature painting, a set of illustrative paintings of the Ragamala or "Garland of Ragas", depicting variations of the Indian musical modes called ragas. They stand as a classical example of the amalgamation of art, poetry and classical music in medieval India.

From the 16th through the 17th centuries, Ragamala paintings were created in most schools of Indian painting. Today, they are named accordingly as Pahari Ragamala, Rajasthan or Rajput Ragamala, Deccan Ragamala, and Mughal Ragamala. The tradition originated in Rajasthan.

In these painting each raga is personified by a colour, mood, a verse describing a story of a hero and heroine (nayaka and nayika), it also elucidates the season and the time of day and night in which a particular raga is to be sung; and finally most paintings also demarcate the specific Hindu deities attached with the raga, like Bhairava or Bhairavi to Shiva, Sri to Devi etc. The paintings depict not just the Ragas, but also their wives, (raginis), their numerous sons (ragaputra) and daughters (ragaputri).

The six principal ragas present in the Ragamala are Bhairava, Deepak, Sri, Malkaunsa, Megha and Hindola and these are meant to be sung during the six seasons of the year – summer, monsoon, autumn, early winter, winter and spring.

== History ==
Asavari Ragini. Sirohi, c. 1700. Cleveland Museum of Art

Sangita Ratnakara is an important 12th century CE treatise on the classification of Indian Ragas, which for the first time mentions the presiding deity of each raga. From the 14th century onwards, they were described in short verses in Sanskrit, for dhyana, 'contemplation', and later depicted in a series of paintings, called the Ragamala paintings. Some of the best available works of Ragamala are from the 16th and 17th centuries, when the form flourished under royal patronage, though by the 19th century, it gradually faded.

== Extant works ==
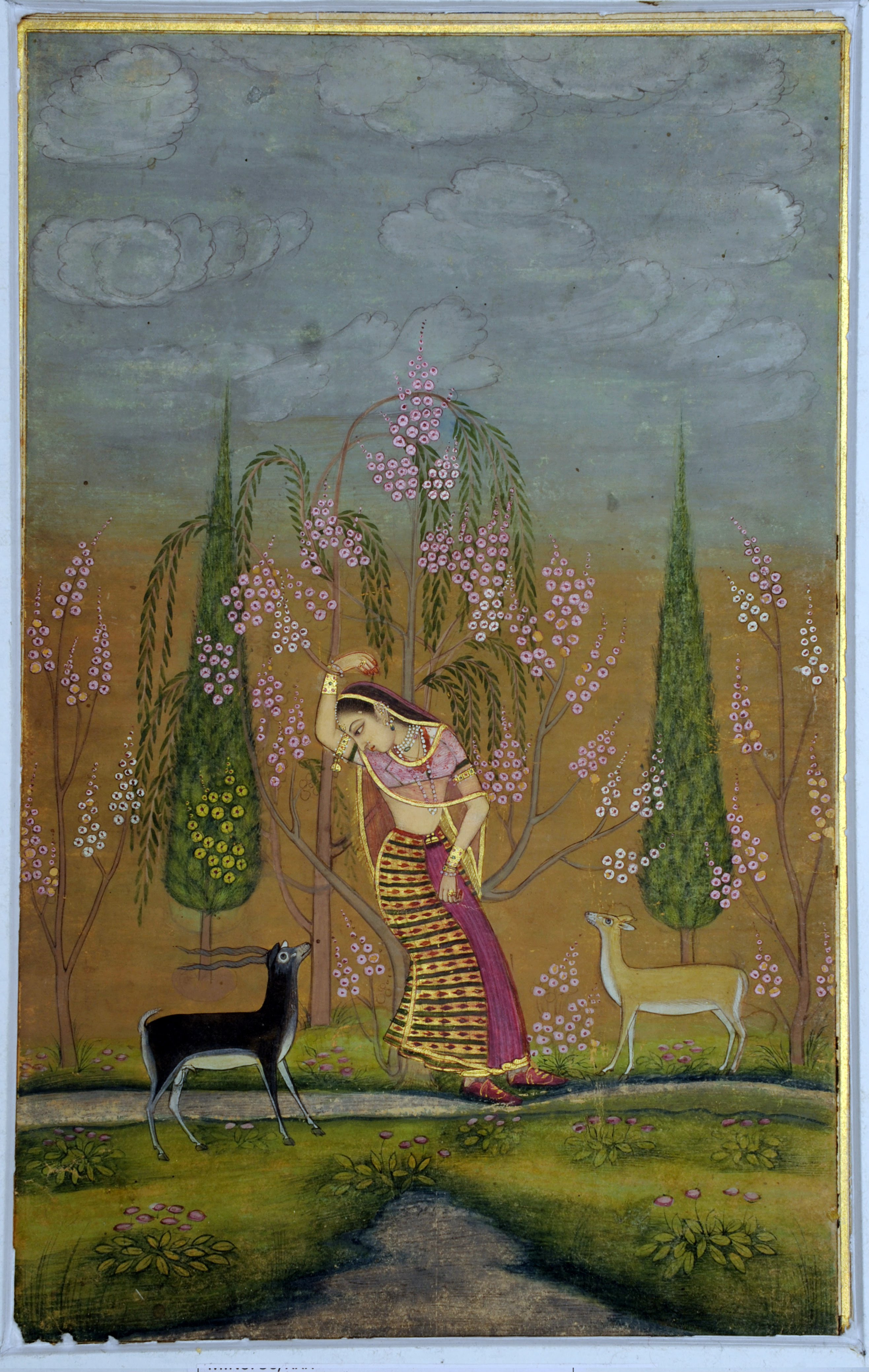
Ragini Todi. Mughal, c. 1750. Salar Jung Museum

In 1570, Kshemakarna, a priest of Rewa in Central India, compiled a poetic text on the Ragamala in Sanskrit, which describes six principal Ragas—Bhairava, Malakoshika, Hindola, Deepak, Shri, and Megha—each having five Raginis and eight Ragaputras, except Raga Shri, which has six Raginis and nine Ragaputras, thus making a Ragamala family of 86 members

Most of the extant works of Ragamala are from Deccan style, where Ibrahim Adil Shah II of Bijapur, was himself also a fine painter and illustrator, though some Rajput style also exist of which the work of an artist of the 'Chawand' (a part of Mewar) school of painting, Sahibdin, whose Ragamala (musical modes) series dated 1628, are now in National Museum of India.

Ragamala sets discovered in Odisha are in the Pattachitra style, based on the ragas of Odissi music and show distinct iconography and raga groups from other regions.

== The Ragas in Ragamala ==
Six are male (parent) ragas; the thirty raginis are their wives and the remaining forty-eight are their sons. These are listed is as follows:

- (1) Parent Raga: Bhairav raga

Wives: Bhairavi, Bilawali, Punyaki, Bangali, Aslekhi. Sons: Pancham, Harakh, Disakh, Bangal, Madhu, Madhava, Lalit, Bilaval.

- (2) Parent Raga: Malkaus raga

Wives: Gaundkari, Devagandhari, Gandhari, Seehute, Dhanasri. Sons: Maru, Mustang, Mewara, Parbal, Chand, Khokhat, Bhora, Nad.

- (3) Parent Raga: Hindol raga

Wives: Telangi, Devkari, Basanti, Sindhoori, Aheeri. Sons: Surmanand, Bhasker, Chandra-Bimb, Mangalan, Ban, Binoda, Basant, Kamoda.

- (4) Parent Raga: Deepak raga

Wives: Kachheli, Patmanjari, Todi, Kamodi, Gujri. Sons: Kaalanka, Kuntal, Rama, Kamal, Kusum, Champak, Gaura, Kanra [36].

- (5) Parent Raga: Sri raga

Wives: Bairavi, Karnati, Gauri, Asavari, Sindhavi. Sons: Salu, Sarag, Sagra, Gaund, Gambhir, Gund, Kumbh, Hamir.

- (6) Parent Raga: Megh raga

Wives: Sorath, Gaundi-Malari, Asa, Gunguni, Sooho. Sons: Biradhar, Gajdhar, Kedara, Jablidhar, Nut, Jaldhara, Sankar, Syama.

== Gallery ==
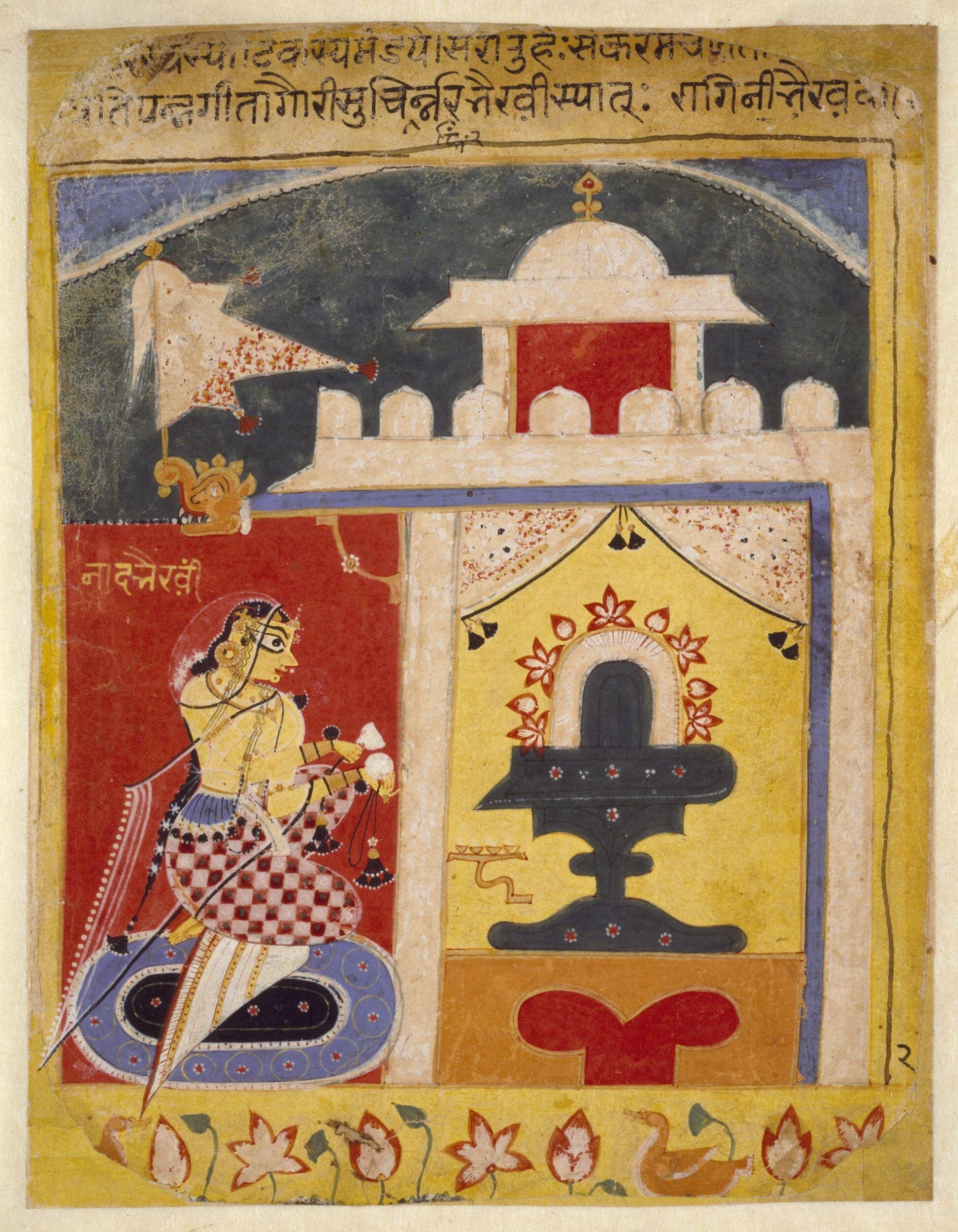
Bhairavi Ragini. Possibly Mewar, c. 1550. Victoria and Albert Museum

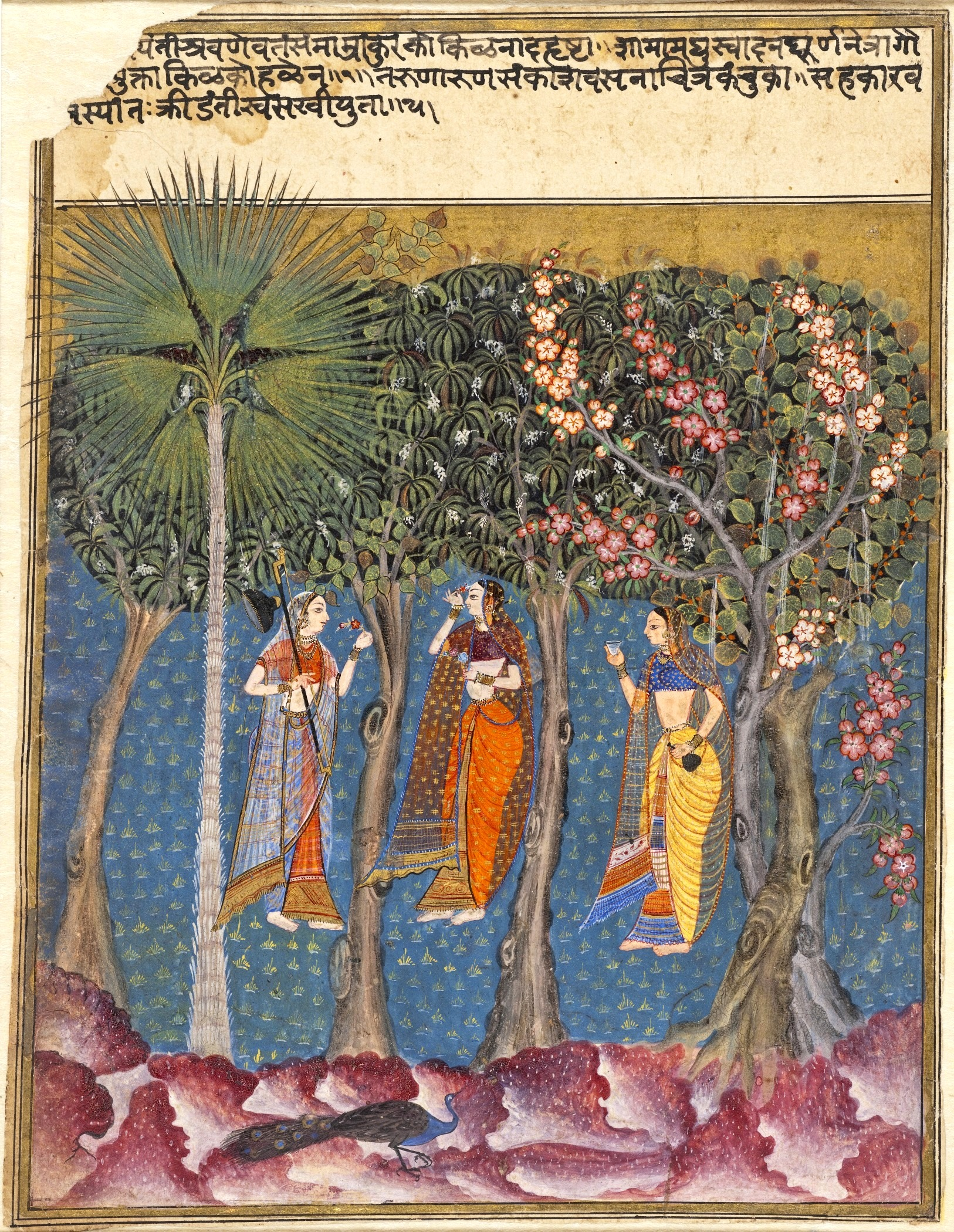
Gauri Ragini. Probably Ahmadnagar, c. 1575-1600. Los Angeles County Museum of Art

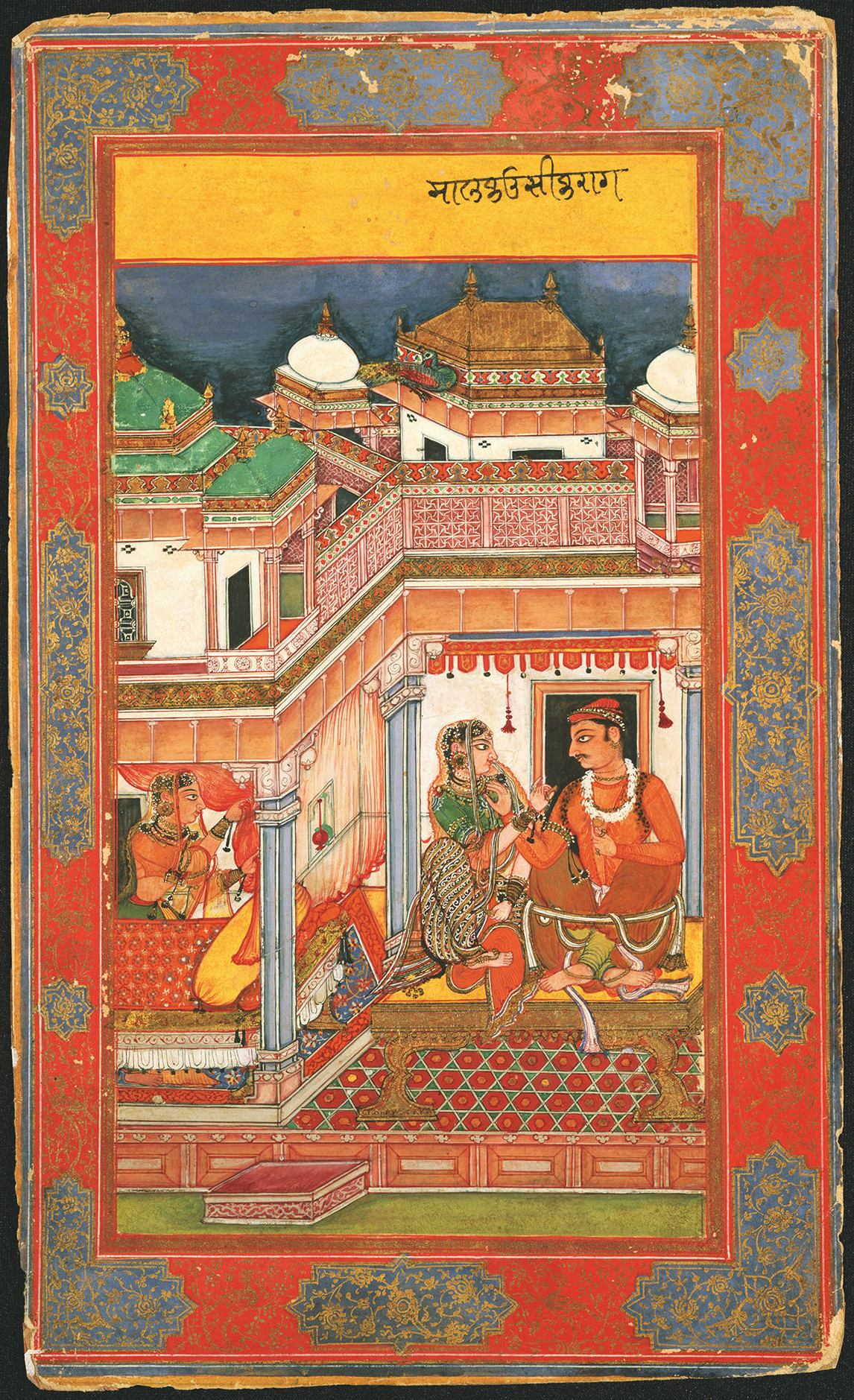
Malkausik Raga, folio from the Chunar Ragamala, dated February 24, 1591. Private collection, New York

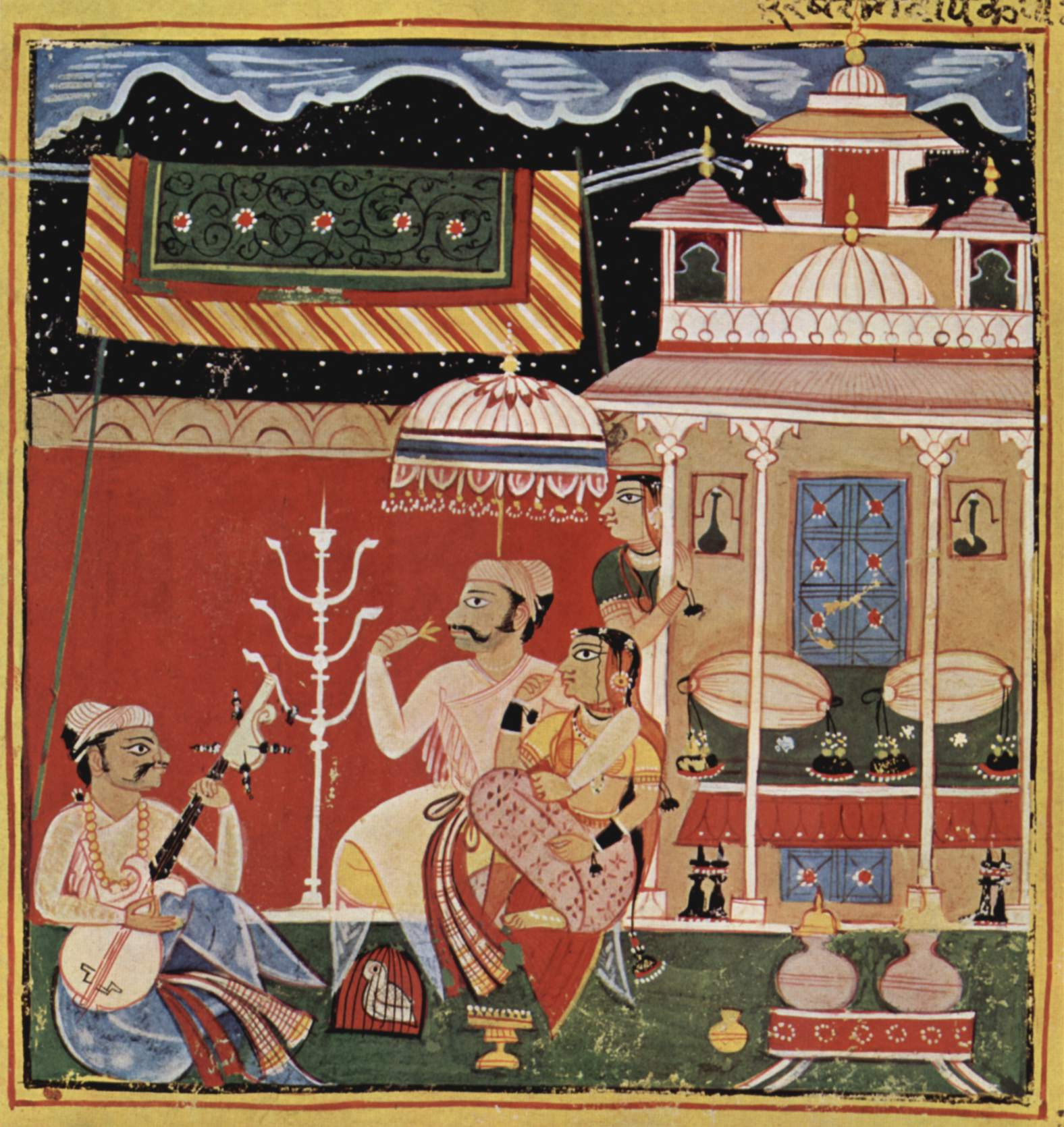
Dipak Raga, folio from the Chawand Ragamala by Nasiruddin. Mewar, 1605. G.K. Kanoria Collection

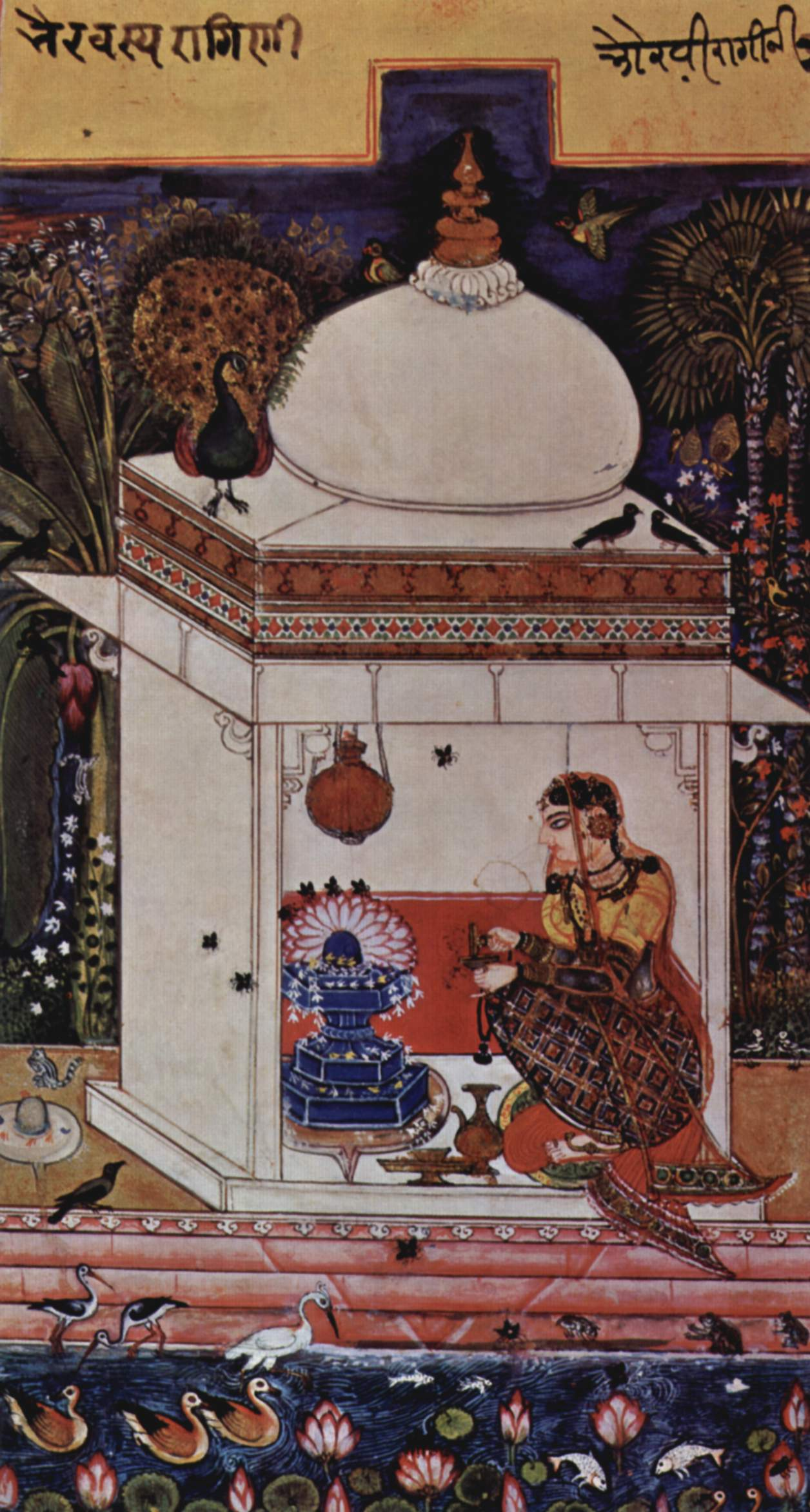
Ragini Bhairavi. Bundi, c. 1625. Allahabad Museum

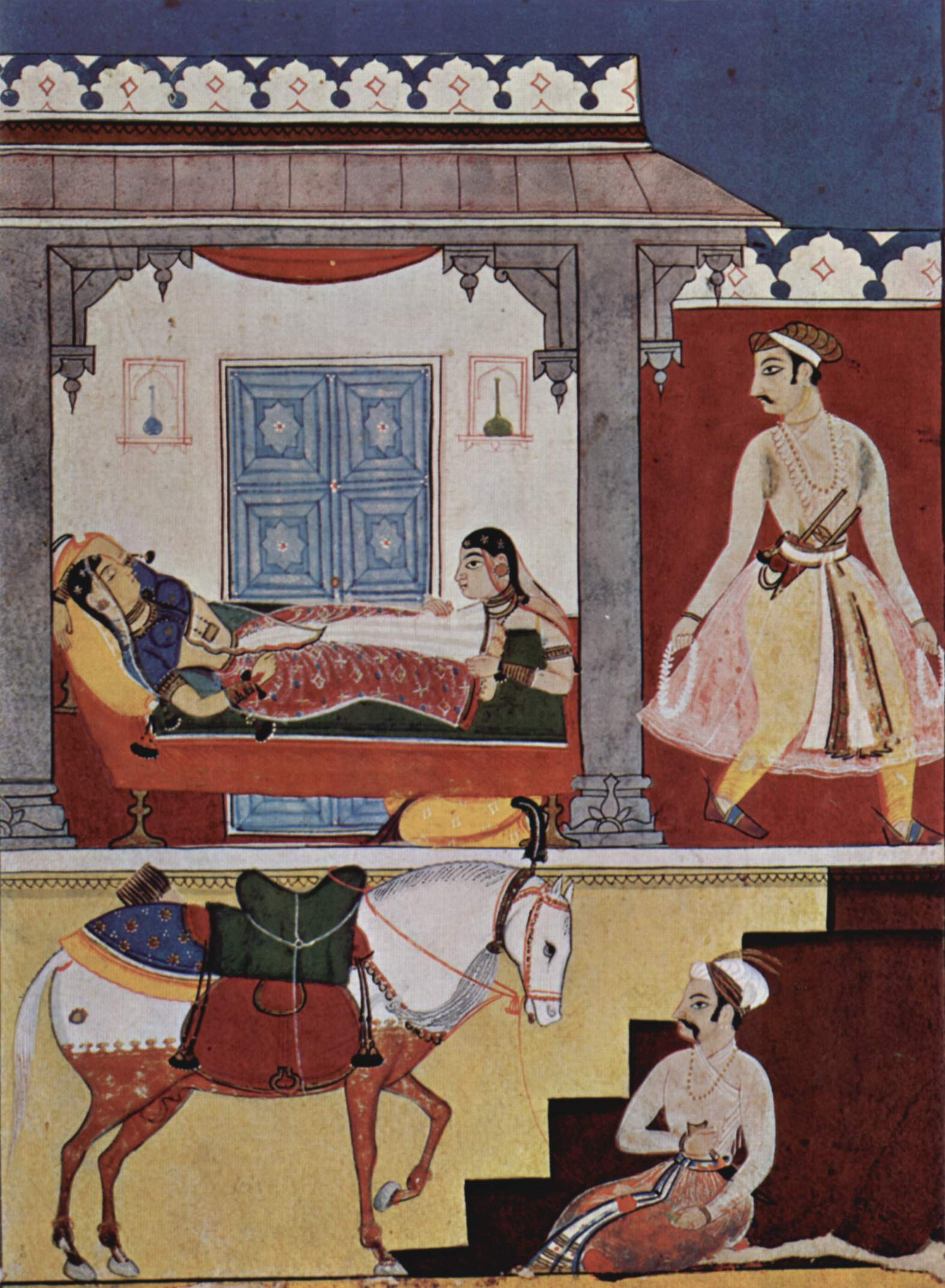
Lalit Ragini, folio from the Ragamala painted by Sahibdin. Mewar, 1628. National Museum, New Delhi

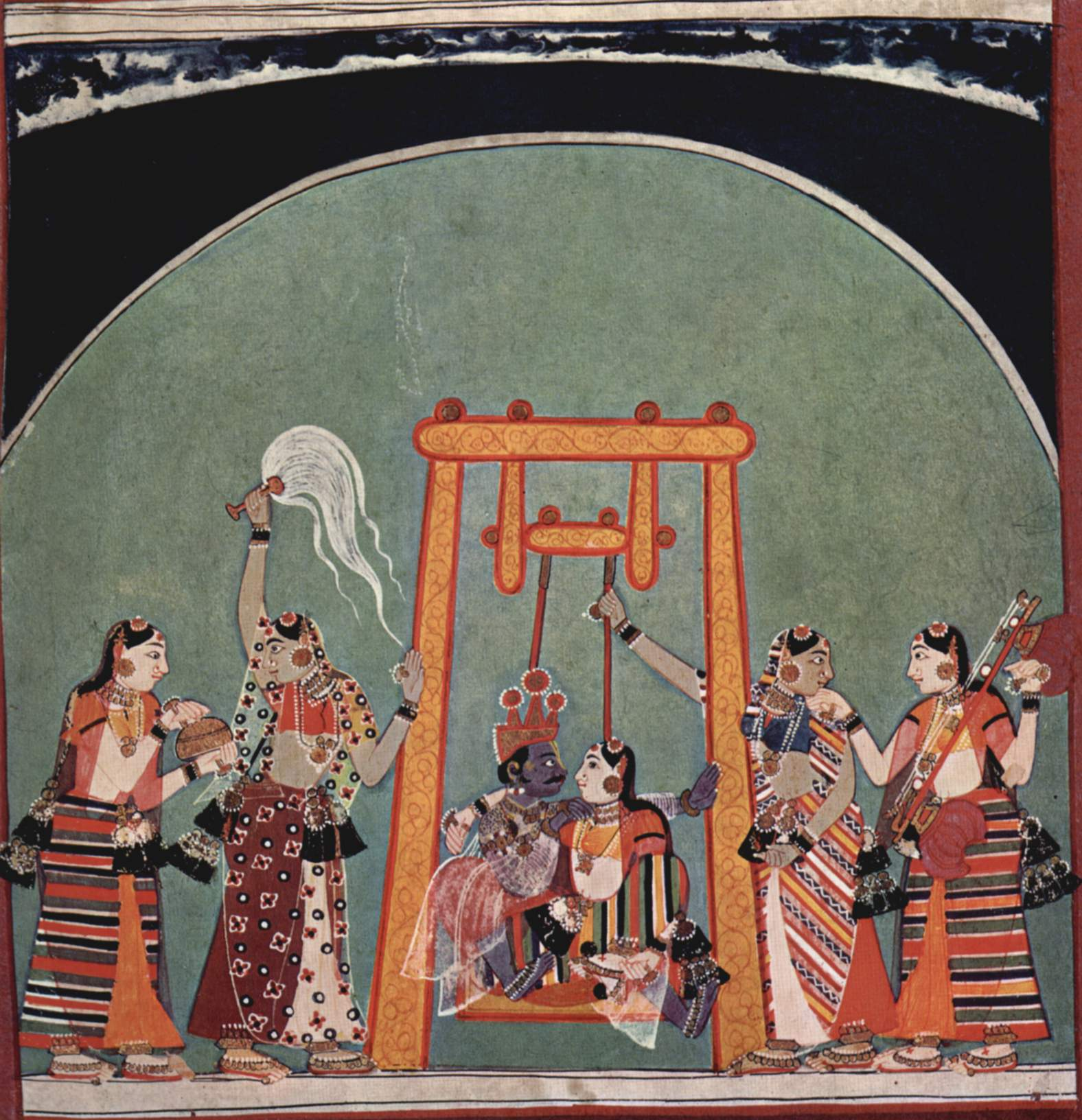
Hindola Raga. Malwa, c. 1650. Bharat Kala Bhavan

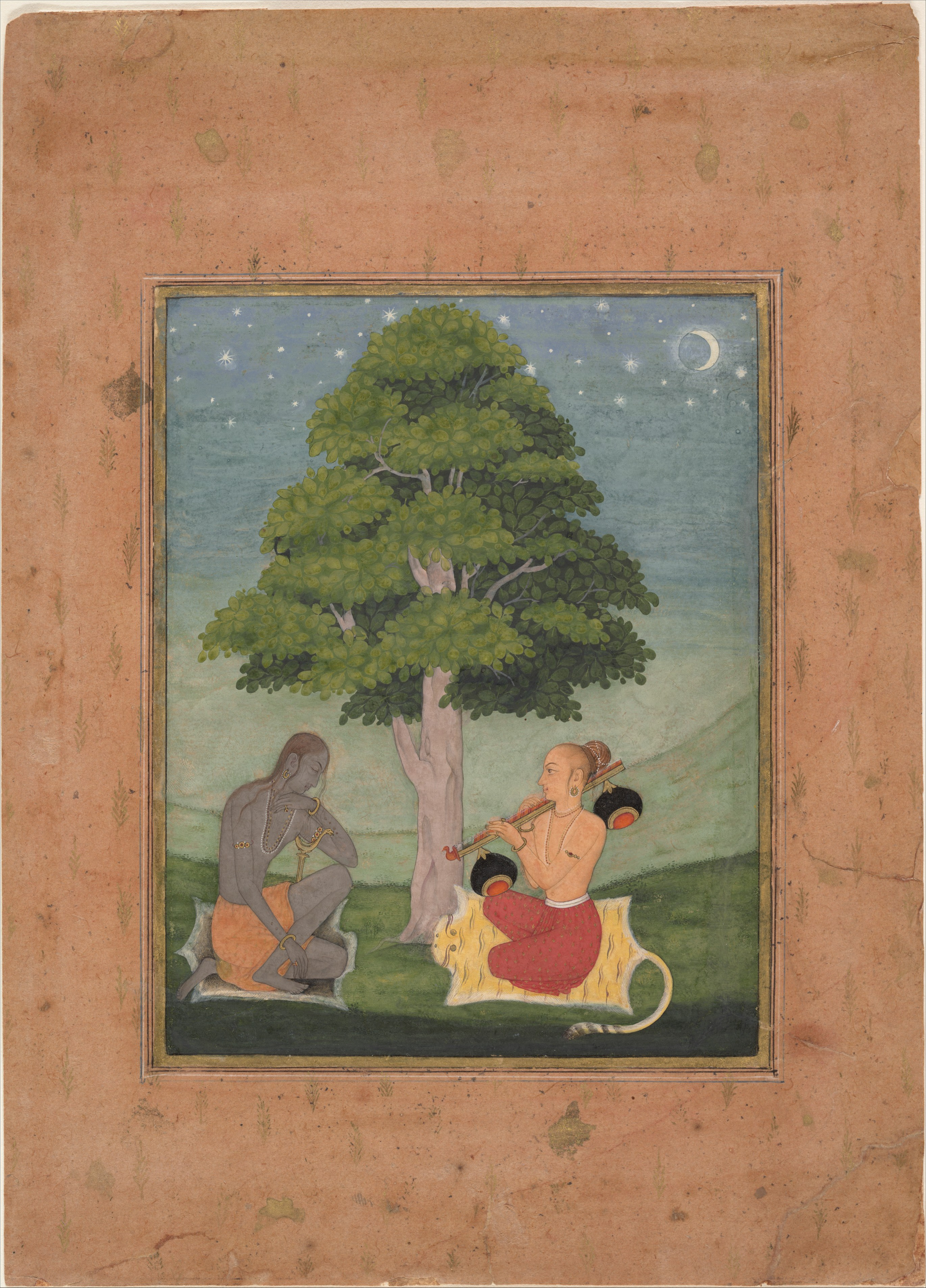
Kedar Ragini, by Ruknuddin. Bikaner, c. 1690-1695. Metropolitan Museum of Art

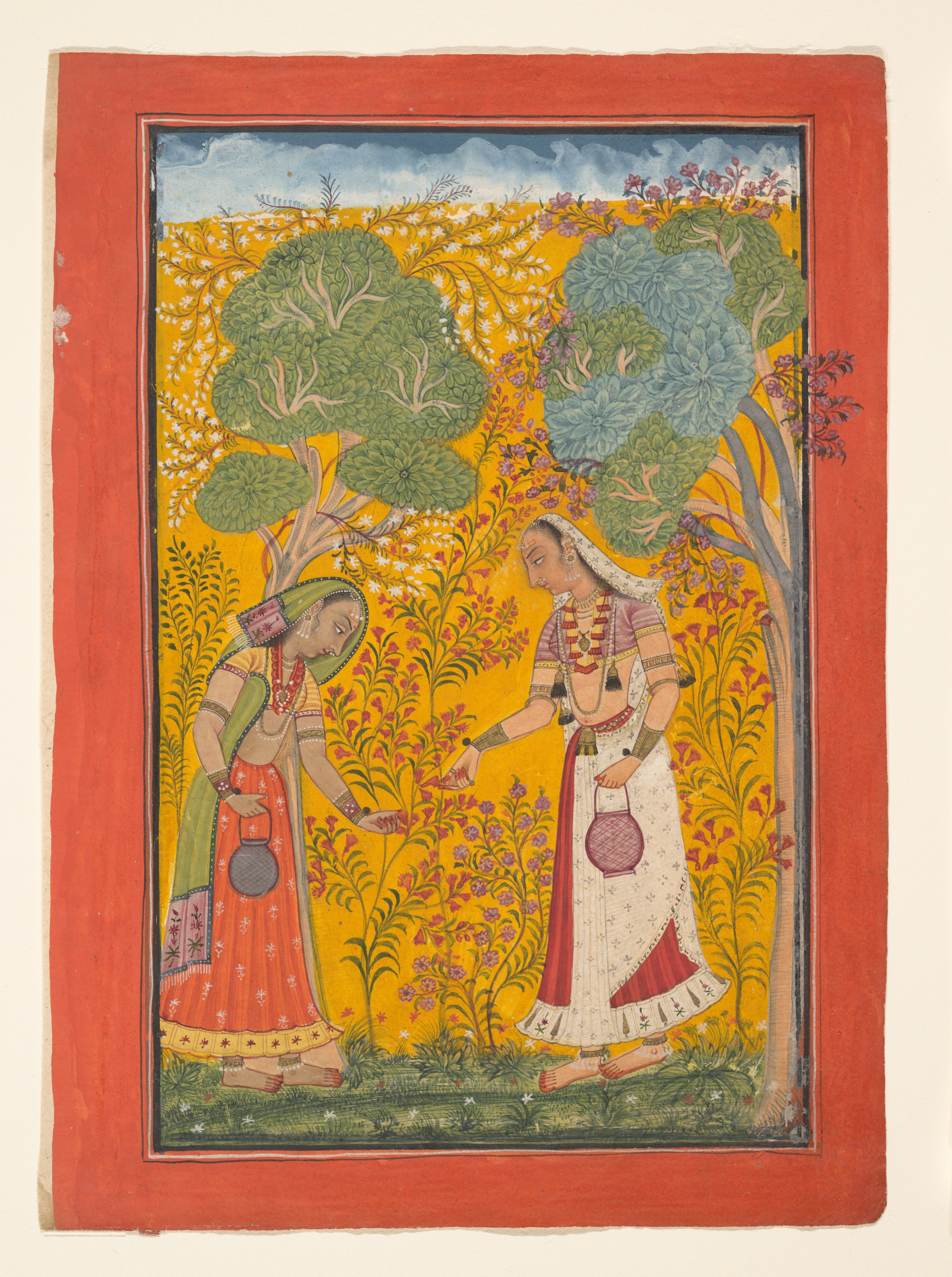
Vasanti Ragini. Bilaspur, c. 1710. Metropolitan Museum of Art

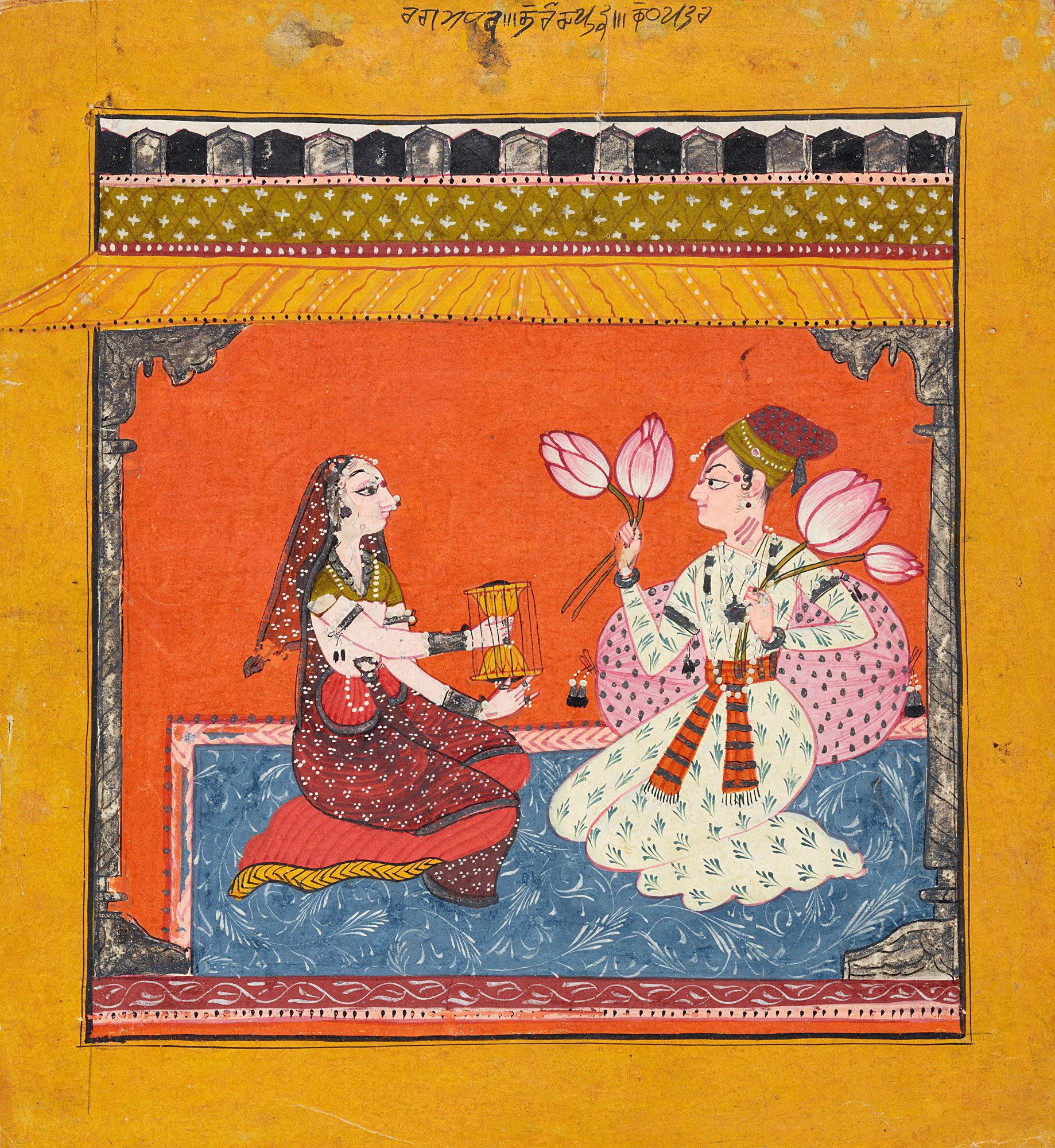
Raga Madhava, by the 2nd Master of the Shangri Ramayana series. Probably Bahu, c. 1720. Rietberg Museum

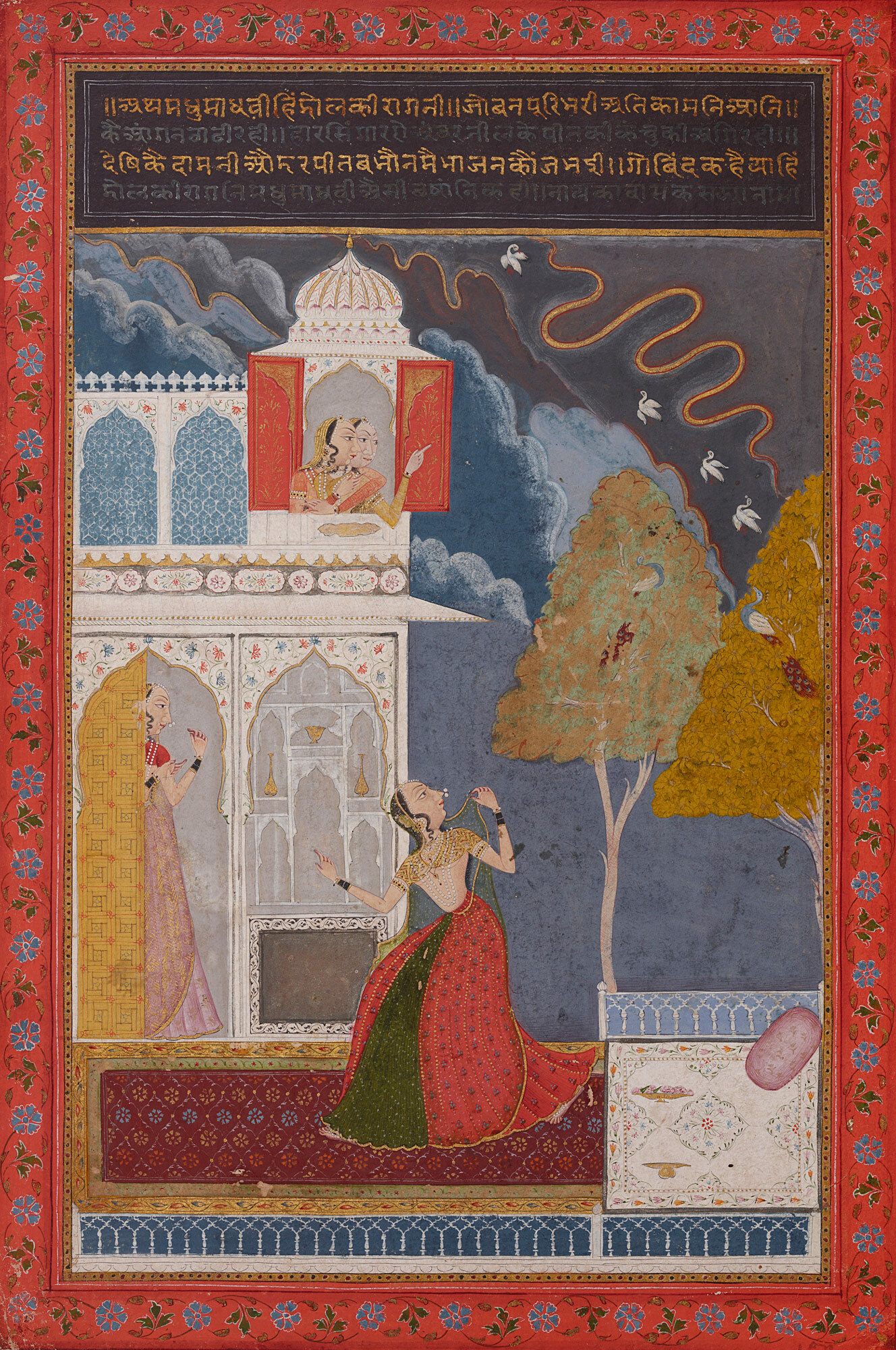
Ragini Madhumadhavi, by Jay Krishna. Malpura, c. 1756. Rietberg Museum

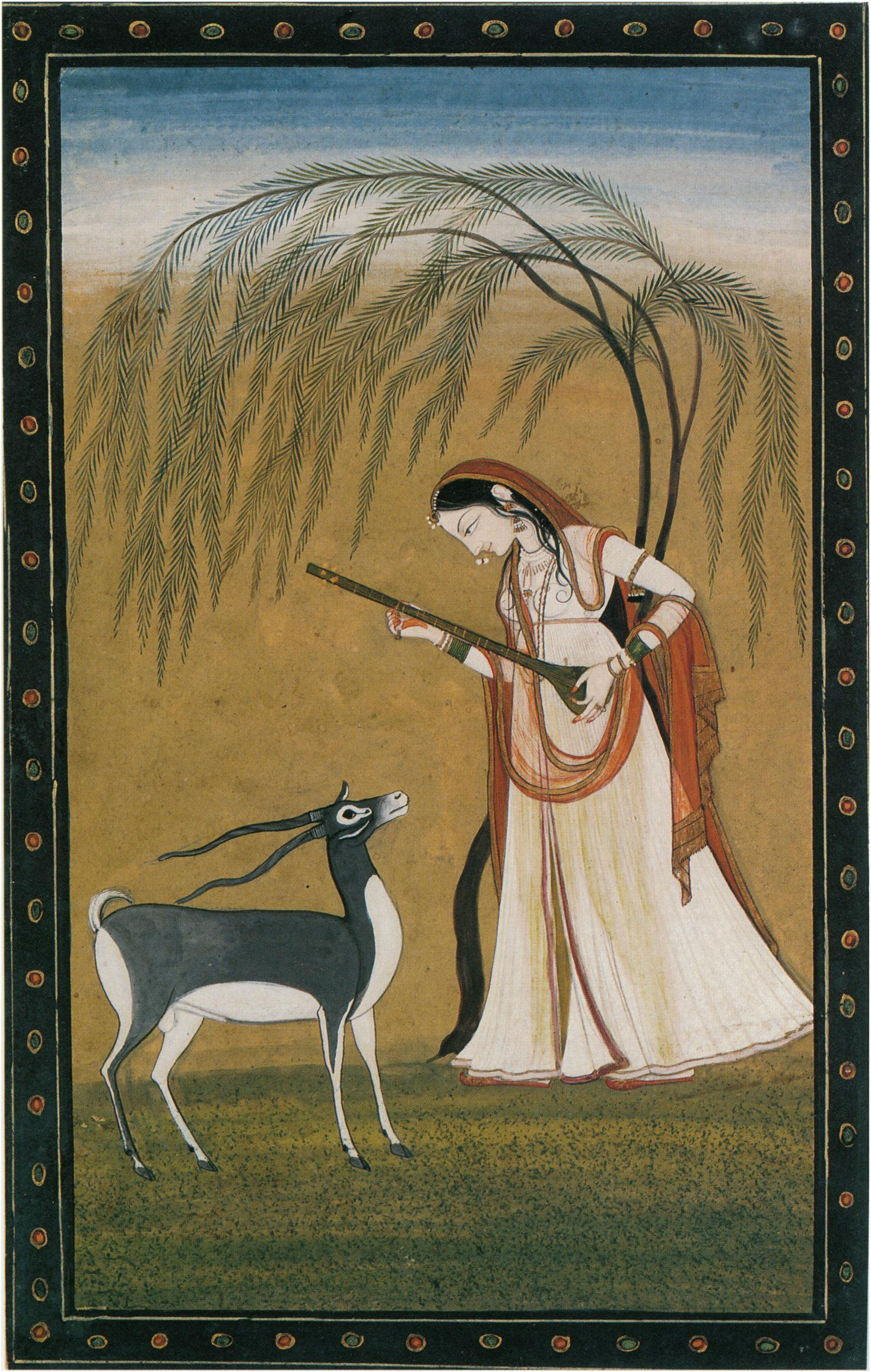
Ragini Todi. Ascribed to a Master of the Second Generation after Nainsukh, c. 1825-30. Government Museum and Art Gallery, Chandigarh

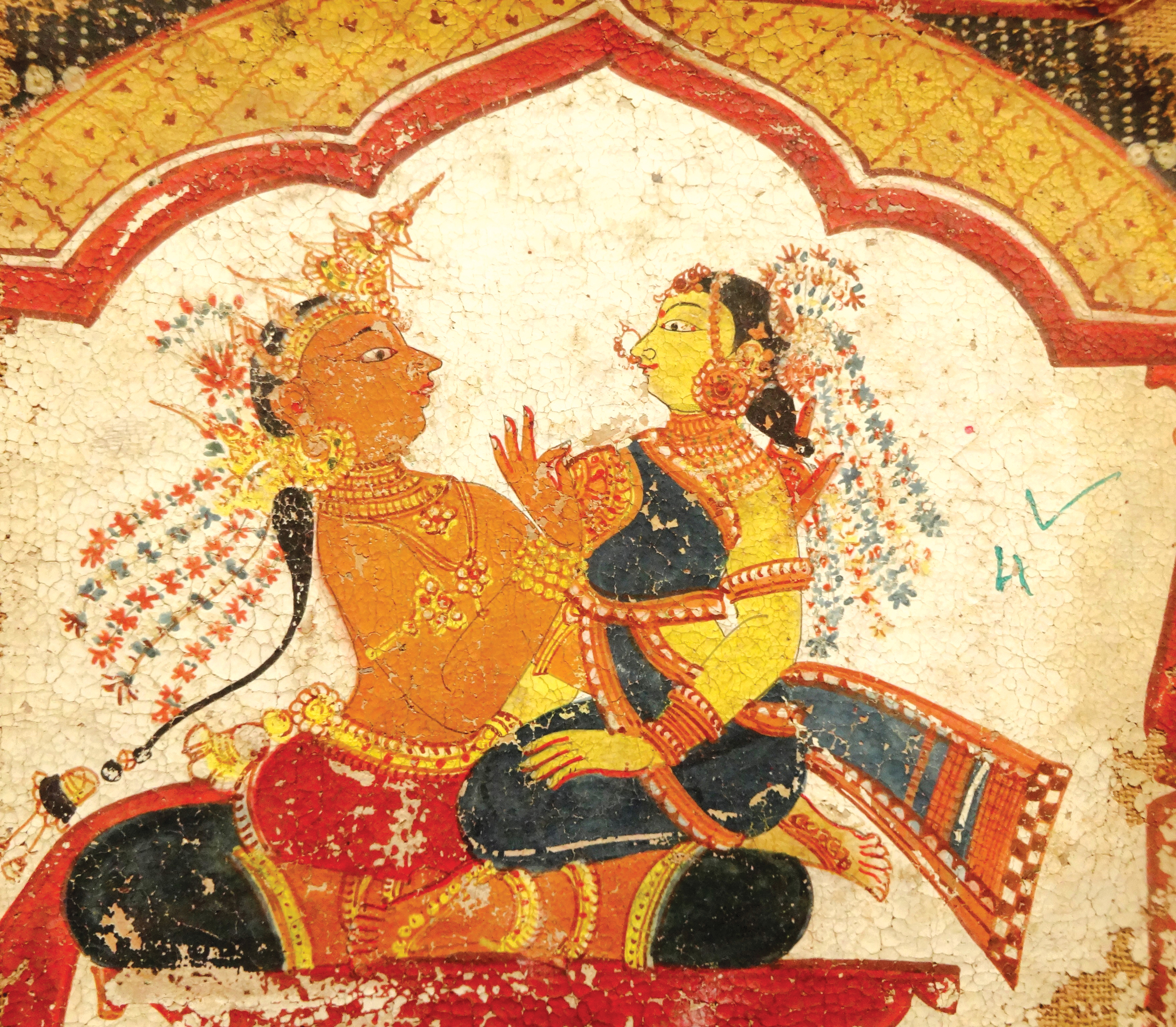
Two lovers (possibly Kodaba Raga). Pigment on cloth, in the technique closely resembling that used in Odishan pattachitras. Odisha, circa 1850. Private collection
