= Sahibdin =

Indian miniature painter of the Mewar school of Rajasthan painting

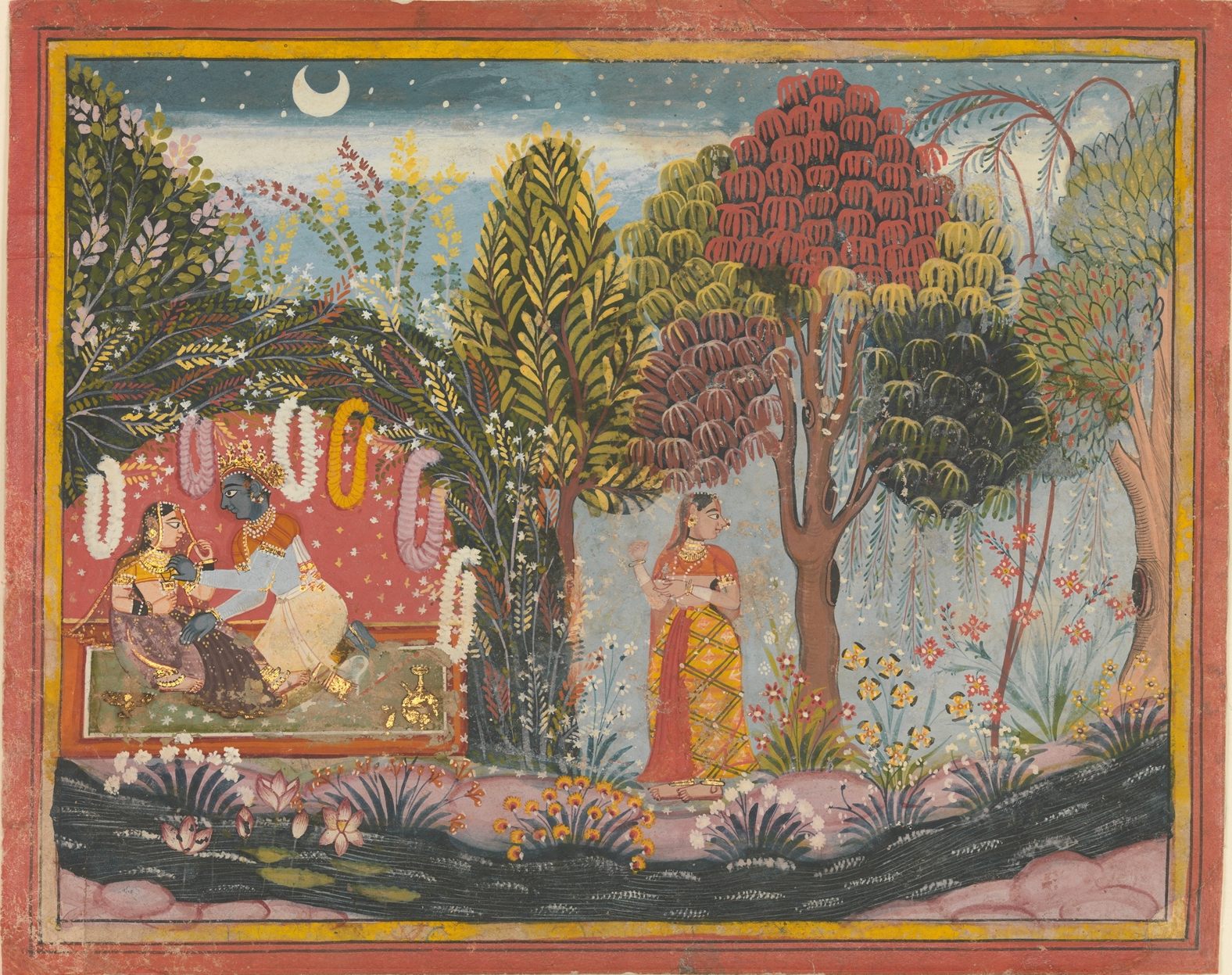
An example of a work by Sahibdin. It depicts Krishna and Radha in a Bower, a scene from a dispersed Gita Govinda.

Sahibdin (fl. 17th century) was an Indian miniature painter of the Mewar school of Rajasthan painting. He was one of the dominant painters of the era, and one of the few whose name is still known today (another being the painter Manohar Das). Sahibdin was a Muslim, but that kept neither his Hindu patrons from employing him, nor him from composing Hindu-themed works of great value. Sahibdin's paintings deftly combine elements of the "popular Mughal" style then in vogue across northern India with the traditional Rajput style.

Among his surviving works are a series of musically themed "Ragamala" from 1628; a series on the scriptural text Bhagavata Purana from 1648; and illustrations to the Yuddha Kanda, the sixth book of the Ramayana, from 1652. His style can be seen to continue the figure style of the Gujarati era, while also incorporating new elements, like mountainous terrains, from Mughal art.
