= Dogra dynasty =

Hindu dynasty of Jammu and Kashmir (1846–1952)

House of Dogras
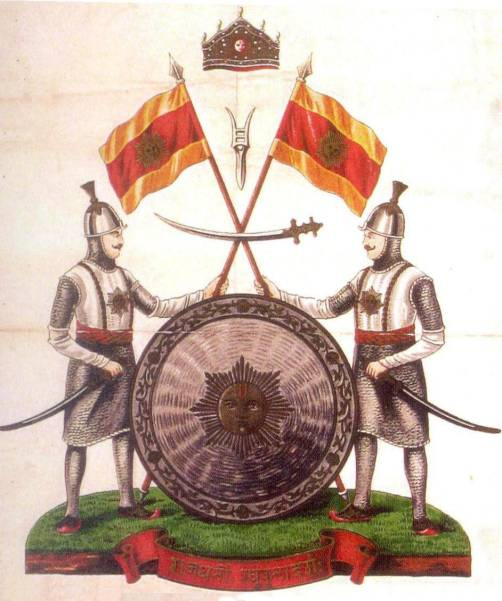
- The Crown at the top. A katar or ceremonial dagger sat below it. Two soldiers holding the flags. An image of the sun symbolising the Suryavansha Kshatriya lineage from Lord Rama

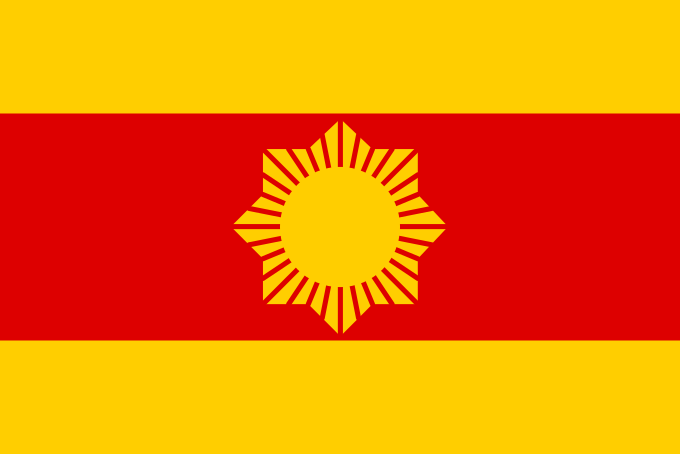
- Flag of Dogra Dynasty
- Country: Jammu State (c. 850–1812); Jammu and Kashmir State (1846–1947)
- Founded: 16 March 1846; 180 years ago
- Founder: Gulab Singh
- Current head: Karan Singh
- Final ruler: Hari Singh; Karan Singh (as Sadr-i-Riyasat)
- Estates: Mubarak Mandi Palace; Amar Mahal Palace; Hari Niwas Palace; Sher Garhi Palace
- Deposition: 1952

The Dogra dynasty of Dogra Rajputs from the Shivalik hills created Jammu and Kashmir through the treaties with the East India Company following the First Anglo-Sikh war. Events led the Sikh Empire to recognise Jammu as a vassal state in 1820, and later the British added Kashmir to Jammu with the Treaty of Amritsar in 1846. The founder of the dynasty, Gulab Singh, was an influential noble in the court of the Sikh emperor Maharaja Ranjit Singh, while his brother Dhian Singh served as the prime minister of the Sikh Empire. Appointed by Ranjit Singh as the hereditary Raja of the Jammu principality, Gulab Singh established his supremacy over all the hill states surrounding the Kashmir Valley. After the First Anglo-Sikh War in 1846, under the terms of the Treaty of Lahore, 1846, the British East India Company acquired Kashmir from the Sikh Empire and transferred it to Gulab Singh, recognising him as an independent Maharaja. Thus, Jammu and Kashmir was established as one of the largest princely states in India, (Note: Jammu and Kashmir was the largest among the princely states by land area and third largest by the amount of annual revenue.) receiving a 21-gun salute for its Maharaja in 1921. It was ruled by Gulab Singh and his descendants until 1947.

The last ruling Maharaja of Jammu and Kashmir was Hari Singh, who contributed troops to the British war effort in World War II and served on Churchill's Imperial War Cabinet. Following the Partition of India in 1947, Hari Singh faced a rebellion in the western districts of the state and a Pakistan-supported tribal invasion, leading him to accede to the Union of India and receive military assistance. Pakistan contested the accession, giving rise to the enduring Kashmir conflict.

With India's support, the popular leader of Jammu and Kashmir, Sheikh Mohammad Abdullah, forced the Maharaja to abdicate in favour of his son, Yuvraj (Crown Prince) Karan Singh, who subsequently accepted the position of a constitutional head of state (Sadr-i-Riyasat) and voluntarily gave up the title of Maharaja.

== Etymology ==
The term Dogra is thought to derive from Durgara, the name of a kingdom mentioned in an eleventh century copper-plate inscription in Chamba. According to Mira Seth, the Durgara region was situated between the outer hills located between the Ravi and Chenab rivers and was derived from a tribal name. In medieval times the term became Dugar, which later turned into Dogra. Kalhana's Rajatarangini makes no mention of a kingdom by this name, but it could have been referred to by its capital (either Vallapura, modern Balor, or Babbapura, modern Babor). In modern times, the term Dogra turned into an ethnic identity, claimed by all those people that speak the Dogri language.

The family of Raja Gulab Singh is referred to as Jamwal (or Jamuwal). According to some accounts, Raja Kapur Dev, who ruled the area of Jammu around 1560 AD had two sons named Jag Dev and Samail Dev. The two sons ruled from the Bahu and Jammu on the opposite banks of the Tawi River and their descendants came to be called Bahuwals and Jamuwals respectively. The members of the family however claim descent from a legendary Suryavanshi (solar) dynasty ruler Jambu Lochan, who is believed to have founded the city of Jammu in antiquity.

== Origin ==
Prior to the arrival of the Dogras in the region, the local inhabitants of the Durgara region (also known as Durgara Pradesh) were likely Khasas and Kanets, who originally inhabited the Western Himalayan-range. Migrations of Dogri-speaking peoples later followed. The Dogras claim descent from migrants who originated from the present-day regions of Uttar Pradesh, Bihar, and Bengal prior to the Islamic invasions of the Indian subcontinent. Most of the ruling families of the Pahari Hill States traditionally trace their ancestry back to Ayodhya, claiming descent from Sumitra, who was the last descendant of the Suryavanshi lineage of Rama. although is most likely origin myth to claim higher ritual status but are really descendents of local feudal clans.

An ancestor named Jambu Lochan is said to have first moved to the Jammu region, where he established the settlement of Jammu. According to local mythology beliefs, Jambu decided to construct a settlement at Jammu after he witnessed a wild goat and lion drinking from the same water-hole in a forest that was located at the site, being impressed by how two species of predator and prey could peacefully co-exist. From there onwards, branches of the family spread-out to conquer the surrounding mountainous areas of the region, establishing their own dynasties.

== Jammu State ==
=== History of the Jamwal rulers ===
In around the year 850, the Dogras came to power in Jammu, being established by Raja Bhuj or Bhuj Dev. The centres of power for the Dogra rulers at this era were Bahu, Babbapura (Babor), and Jammu. The first historical mention to a Pahari ruler relates to two copper-plate inscription dated to the years 1056 and 1066 that eulogize the feats of Raja Sahilavarman of Chamba State (r. 920–940).

The earliest type of administration in the region consisted of reigns by feudal chieftains, referred to as a thakur or rana. This form of government gradually shifted to one that was hereditary based on primogeniture, leading to the formation of dynasties. These states often warred with one another, absorbing or being absorbed by other states, with the winner usually being the stronger state and the loser the smaller one. By the tenth century, the following prominent Dogra states arose in the Pahari Hills region of the Western Himalayas:

- Jammu – ruled by the Jamwal clan
- Mankot – ruled by the Mankotia clan
- Jasrota – ruled by the Jasrotia clan
- Lakhanpur – ruled by the Lakhanpuria clan
- Samba – ruled by the Sambial clan
- Tirikot – ruled by the Tiri Kotia clan
- Akhnur – ruled by the Akhnuria clan
- Riasi – ruled by the Riasial clan
- Dalpatpur – ruled by the Dalpatia clan
- Bhau – ruled by the Bhauwal clan
- Bhoti – ruled by the Bhatial clan
- Chenehni – ruled by the Hantal clan
- Bandralta – ruled by the Bandral clan
- Basholi – ruled by the Balauria clan
- Bhadrawaha – ruled by the Bhadrawahia clan
- Bhadu – ruled by the Bhaduwal clan
- Kashtwar – ruled by the Kashtwaria clan
- Punch – ruled by the Mangral clan
- Kotli – ruled by the Mangral clan
- Rajauri – ruled by the Jarral clan

Mahmud of Ghazni's army passed through the Punjab and invaded Poonch State, however he did not attack Jammu State and the polity was spared from fighting. There is a mention in Kalhana's Rajatarangini of three Dogra rulers, namely Kirti and Vajradhara of Babbapura and Umadhara. All three of these rulers are also mentioned in the Vansavali (genealogy) of the Jammu ruling house, albeit with minor variations. The Jammu rulers were close with the Kashmiri rulers, such as during the reign of Kalasa and Bhikshachara. The Dogra-ruler Vajradhara is said to have allied with Trigarta (Kangra), Vallapura (Balaor), Vartula (Batal), and Thakkuras of the Chandrabhaga Valley, to pledge allegiance to Bhikshachara of Kashmir. Bhikshachara asceded to the throne of Kashmir in 1120.

In the autobiography of Timur from 1399, known as the Malfuzat-i-Timuri, there is a reference to a ruler of Jammu ("Raja-Jammu") but no mention of their specific name is given but it would have been Raja Mal Dev of Jammu who resisted the Timurids. (Note: Raja Mal Dev's name is also rendered as 'Raja Maldev'.) This is the first mention of the region of Jammu in recorded-history. According to the Timurid account, Jammu was invaded and Raja Bhim was converted to Islam. The Timurid account mentions that large amounts of booty that consisted of grain and property were taken from Jammu by them. However, these early contracts with Islamic polities did not leave any lasting impression on Jammu until the rule of the Mughals. Raja Mal Dev was the fourth ruler of the Dev dynasty and he ruled Jammu from 1361 to 1400, establishing his headquarters at Purani Madi. After Raja Mal Dev, between the years 1400 to 1733, ten descendants of Raja Mal Dev ruled Jammu. For some centuries, the Jammu-Babbapura rulers would reign nearly independently and supported the Sultans of Delhi. Raja Hamir or Bhim Dev was recorded as being a supporter of Mubarak Shah (r. 1421–1434) of the Sayyid dynasty of the Delhi Sultanate against the Khokhars of the Darvabhisara Hills.

With the oncoming of the Mughal empire, the Jammuite rulers resisted their attempts overwhelm them but finally succumbed once they could reach favourable terms. The Mughals were aggressive toward the small states of the Western Himalayas, with Akbar declaring himself as their sovereign ruler. Twenty-two of the hill states recognized the sovereignty of Akbar and each dispatched a local prince to the Mughal court. The princes would effectively be hostages to ensure that the small hill states would act courteous to the Mughal authority. However, the hill states often resisted the Mughals and rose up in rebellion against them, such is the case with Jammu State, which rose in insurrection against the Mughals on three separate instances during this time: the first between the years 1588–9, the second between 1594–5, and the third from 1616–17.

During the reign of Akbar between the years 1594–95, the Jammu ruler Raja Parasram Dev teamed-up with fellow Pahari rulers Rai Pratap of Jasrota and Rai Balbhadra of Lakhanpur in a rebellion against the Mughals, which raged from Kangra to the Jammu Hills. As per the Ain-i-Akbari, Raja Sangram Dev of Jammu was against Raja Man, viceroy of Lahore, with him slaying Raja Man in 1616–17 during the reign of emperor Jahangir. During the reigns of the Mughal emperors Shah Jahan and Aurangzeb, Dogra relations with the Mughals had pacified, with the vansavali recording that Rajas Bhup Dev (r. 1624–1650) and Raja Hari Dev (r. 1650–1686) were employed as mansabdars by the Mughals. However, not all of the hill chiefs were amicable to the Mughals still, as the rulers of Basohli State, resisted them further between 1635 and 1673, whilst the Mughal forces were commanded by Zain Khan Koka. Raja Hari Dev died in 1686 during the Deccani campaigns of Aurangzeb.

The successor of Hari Dev, who was Raja Gaje Dev (r. 1686–1707), moved toward re-establishing the independence of Jammu from the Mughals. His successor, Raja Dhruv Dev, worked toward the same ambition.

==== Dhruv Dev ====
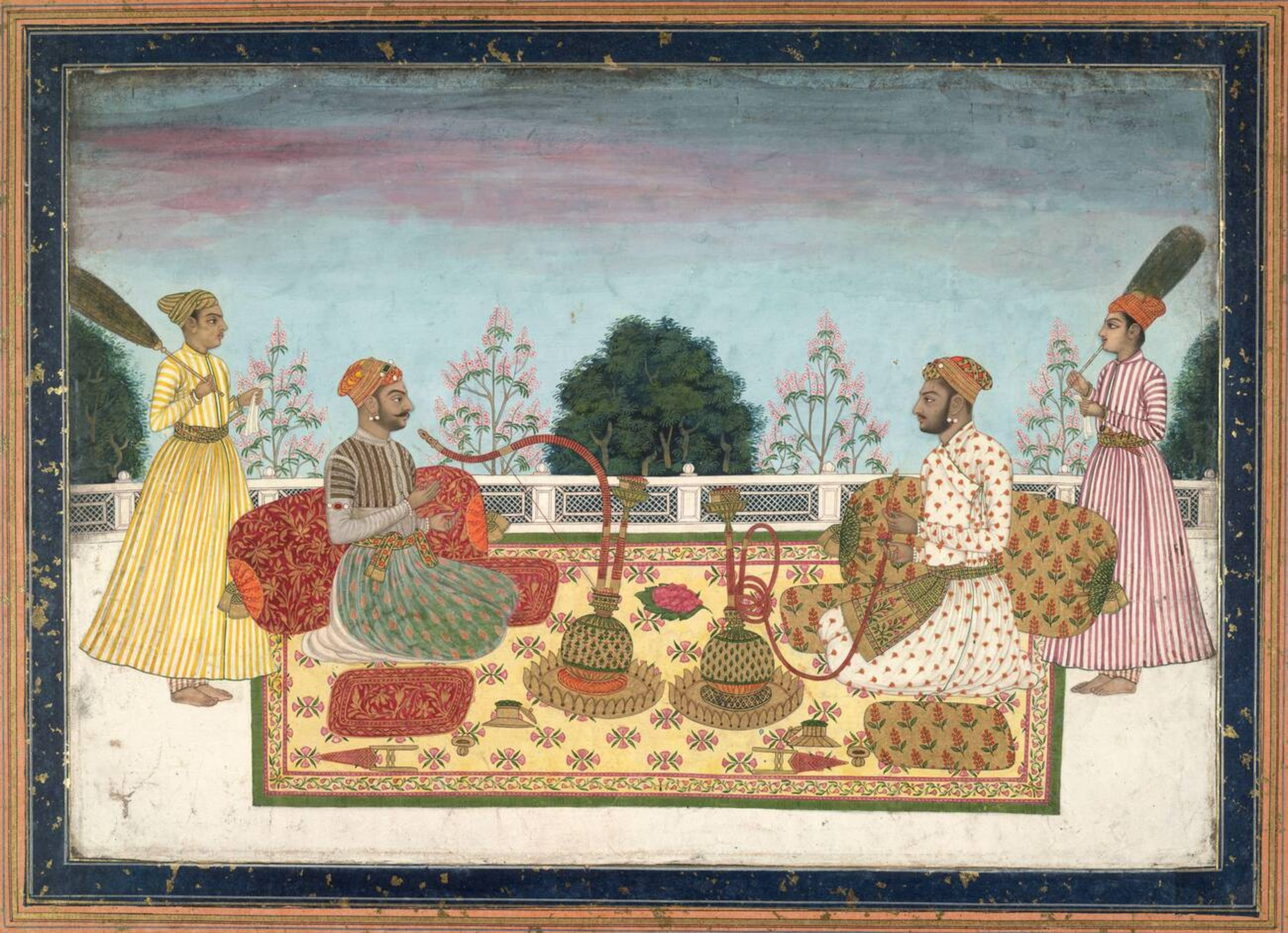
Painting of Raja Anand Dev of Bahu State seated with Raja Dhruv Dev of Jammu State, by Patak Chand, ca.1770

Jammu was a small principality until the decline of Mughal authority in the early 18th century, where-after it arose to become a regional powerhouse during the reign of Raja Dhruv Dev. Jammu was ruled by the Dev Dynasty, which descends from Raja Mal Dev. Raja Dhruv Dev laid down the foundations of the Jamwal rulers of Jammu in 1703. During the reign of Dhruv Dev, Jammu was unified and it established authority and dominance over the other surrounding Hill States. The other hill states of Jasrota, Basohli, Mankot, and Bandralta were brought under Jammu's writ under Raja Dhruv Dev.

Raja Ranjit Dev had four sons: Ranjit Dev, Ghansar Dev, Surat Dev, and Balwant Dev. (Note: Balwant Dev is commonly known as 'Balwant Singh'.) Ranjit Dev was the successor to the Jammu throne whilst Balwant Dev was given control over the jagir of Sarunisar. Balwant Dev was the patron of Pahari artists, such as Nainsukh. Surat Dev, the third son of Dhruv Dev, was married to two women, one from the Salaria clan of Bara Pind, and the other from the Chibs of Batala. Surat Dev would go-on to produce four sons with these two wives: Zorawar Singh, Mian Mota, Bhulla, and Dulla. Zorawar Singh was granted the jagir of Deval. Zorawar Singh would later marry a Jit Rajput women of Charhai whilst Mian Mota married into the family of Raja Jai Singh Jaswal. Zorawar Singh's son was named Kishore Singh, with Kishore later marrying a Bhadwal woman from Marhta in Basohli tehsil. Kishore's son was Gulab Singh.

==== Ghansar Dev ====
Ghansar Dev, also known as Ghansar Chand, was the second son of Dhruv Dev and was born in ca.1715 (or perhaps earlier). He occupied the regency of Jammu State from 1735 to 1747, as Ranjit Dev had been arrested and imprisoned at Lahore between the years 1735–1747 due to the Mughals suspecting him of being disloyal to their governor of the hill region, therefore Ghansar served as regent in his elder brother's absence. Traditionally, the region of Jammu was divided into two states that were based on either side of the Tawi river: Bahu State and Jammu State. During the reign of Ghansar, Bahu State ceased to be an independent entity for unclear reasons and was absorbed into Jammu State.

==== Ranjit Dev ====
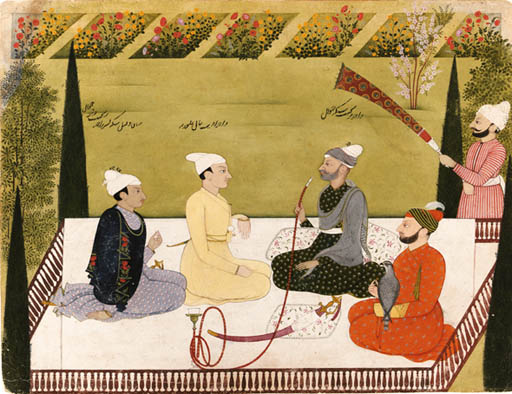
Painting of Raja Amrit Pal of Basohli State with Raja Ranjit Dev of Jammu State and two of his sons, Jammu, ca.1765. Brij Raj Dev, the future successor, is wearing red and holding a hawk, and Dalel Singh is on the far-left wearing an indigo Kashmiri shawl with poppy border.

Dhruv Dev's successor Raja Ranjit Dev (1735–1781) introduced social reforms such as a ban on sati (immolation of the wife on the pyre of the husband) and female infanticide. Between the years 1735–1747, Ranjit Dev was imprisoned by the Mughals at Lahore as they believed he was disloyal to the Mughal regime. After Nadir Shah invaded the Mughal Empire in 1739, it allowed Raja Ranjit Dev to further develop the independence of Jammu. During the reign of Raja Ranjit Dev, Jammu dominated 22 surrounding Hill States, with them becoming tributaries of Jammu, such as formerly powerful states such as Basohli, Bhadarwah, Kishtwar, and Chinaini states. This reality led to the coining of a local phrase: bāyaṅ vīch Jammu sirdār hai (meaning "Jammu is the chief of the 22 hill states"). Ranjit Dev had five ranis (queens), with polygamy being the norm for wealthy Dogra families.

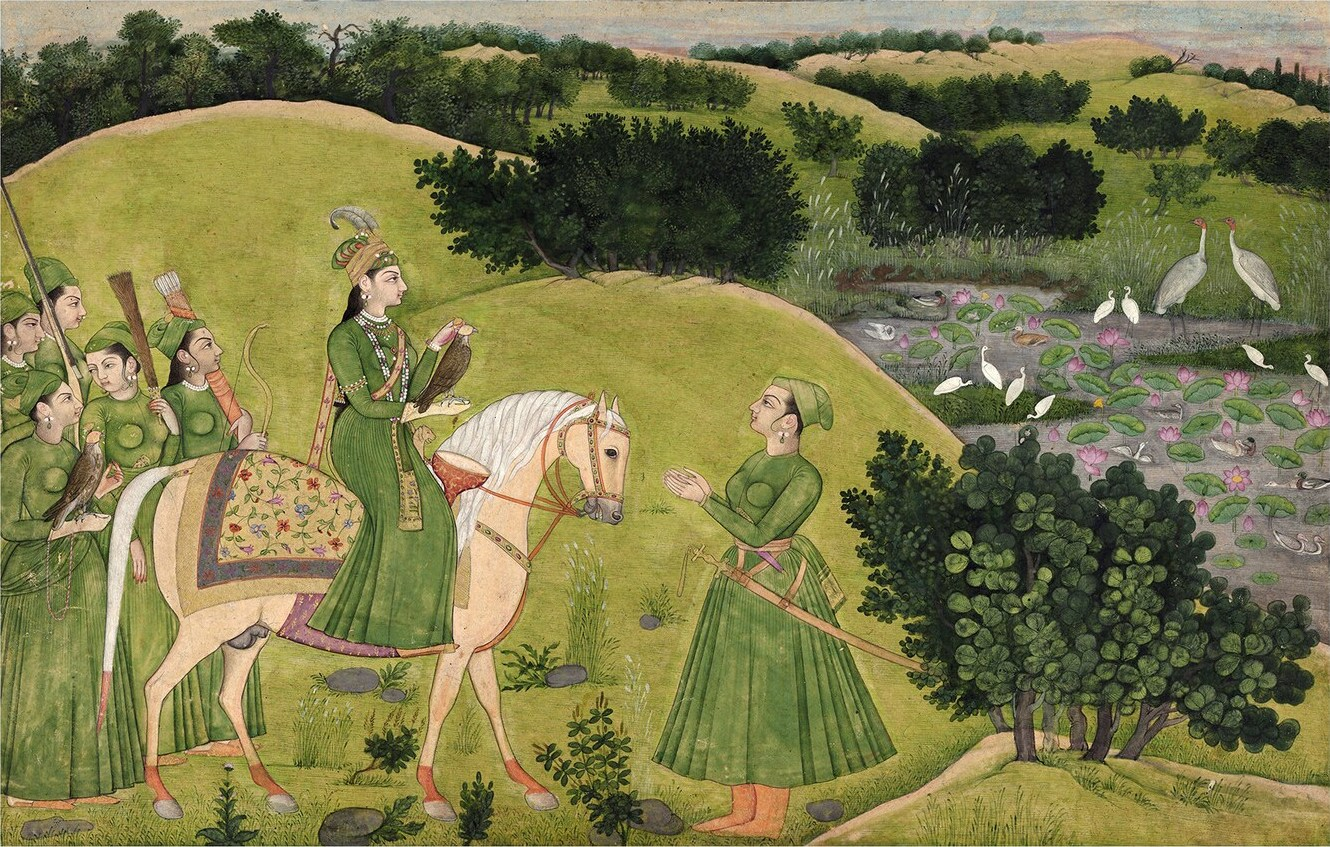
Painting of a begum out hawking with her maids, possibly a depiction of Begum Malka Zamani, attributed to Nainsukh, Jammu, ca.1735–40

Ranjit Dev, like his brother Balwant Dev, was a patron of the arts. During Ranjit's reign, Jammu's local economy benefited, as trading developed, which was noted by the English traveller George Forster in 1783. Forster also noted that the Jammuite rulers were tolerant on the matter of religion. Many refugees from other areas of India settled in Jammu during this period, such as Malka Zamani, Mughlani Begum (widow of Mir Mannu), Hari Singh (s/o Kaura Mal, the diwan of Mir Mannu), and Dalpat Rai (s/o Lakhpat Rai).

The downfall of the Mughals led the Sikh Misls to arise in the Punjab in the subsequent power-vacuum that followed, with this change having repercussions on the Hill States. Towards the end of Ranjit Dev's rule, the Sikh clans of Punjab (misls) gained ascendency, and Jammu began to be contested by the Bhangi, Kanhaiya and Sukerchakia misls. Around 1770, the Bhangi misl attacked Jammu and forced Ranjit Dev to become a tributary. Other sources state that Ranjit Dev was able to successfully fend-off the Sikh attacks on Jammu that occurred later-on in his reign and that it was his successors that succumbed to the Sikhs.

==== Braj Dev ====
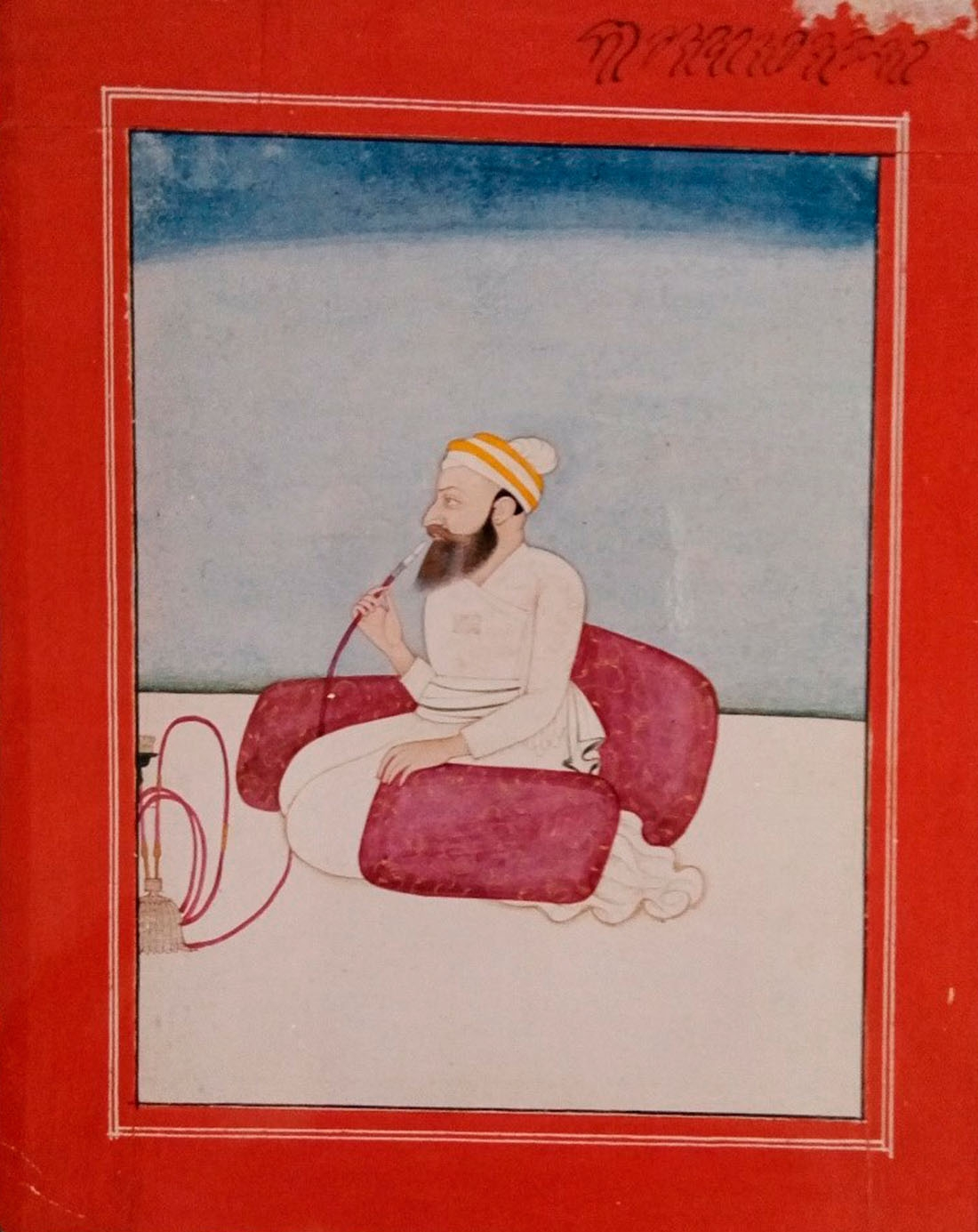
Painting of Raja Brij Raj Dev of Jammu State smoking hookah

Raja Ranjit Dev was succeeded by Raja Braj Dev who killed his brother and nephew to become king. Raja Braj Dev, Ranjit Dev's successor, was defeated by the Sikh Sukerchakia chief Mahan Singh, who sacked Jammu and plundered it. Mahan Singh is said to have taken loot worth two crore rupees from Jammu. Thus Jammu lost its supremacy over the surrounding country. In the Battle of Rumal, the Jammu ruler was killed by Sikhs. Raja Braj Dev was killed during the Sikh invasion of Jammu in 1787.

==== Sampuran Dev ====
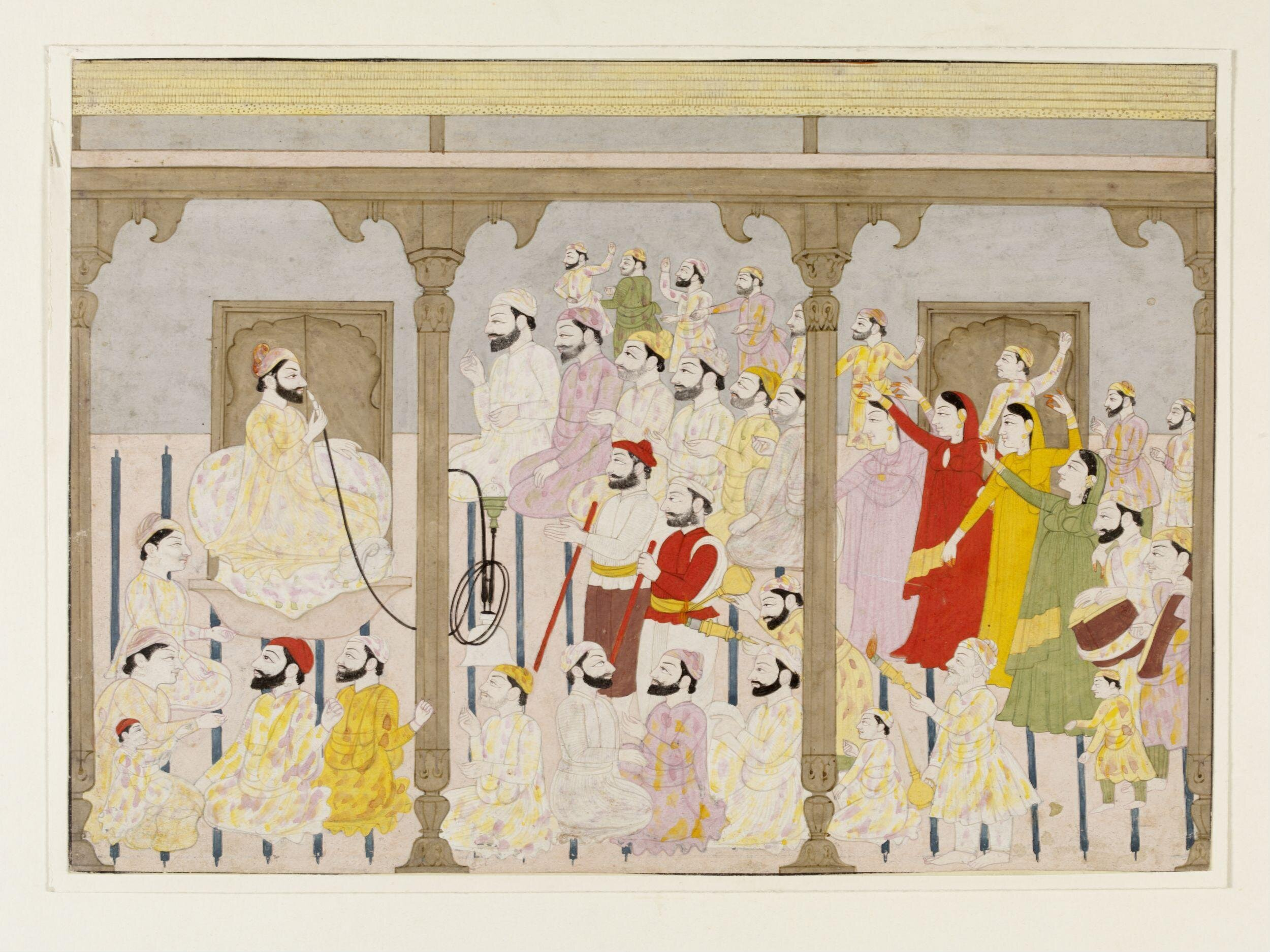
Painting of a Jammu State royal smoking hookah and watching dancing girls, ca.1790

After the death of Raja Braj Dev, the state of Jammu was heavily under the sway of the Punjabi court. His infant son Raja Sampuran Dev (1787–1797) succeeded with Jammu becoming an autonomous tributary under the Sikh Confederacy Misls. (Note: Raja Sampuran's name is alternatively appended with the Singh title, as 'Sampuran Singh', rather than as 'Sampuran Dev'.) The young Sampuran Singh was declared as the feudal lord but would be under the watch of his uncle Mian Mota. Sampuran Singh died at the age of 11 with no issue. Thus, he was succeeded by Raja Jit Singh, who was the son of Dalel Singh. (Note: Raja Jit Singh's name is alternatively spelt as 'Jeet Singh'.)

==== Jit Dev ====
During the reign of Jit Singh, Mian Mota was granted the jagir of Purmandal. Jit Singh was involved in another conflict with the Sikh empire, which he lost and was exiled into British territory. With Jammu fully annexed by the Sikhs around 1808, Ranjit Singh first allotted it to his son Kharak Singh. Other sources give the year 1812 as when Jammu was annexed by the Sikhs.

=== List of rulers of Jammu ===
Ruler	Portrait	Reign	Reference
Raja Sangram Dev		1600 – 1625	
Raja Bhupat Dev		1625 – 1650	
Raja Hari Dev		1660 – 1690	
Raja Gajai Dev		1690 – 1703	
Raja Dhruv Dev		1703 – 1735	
Mian Ghansar Dev		1735 – 1747	
Raja Ranjit Dev		1747 – 1781	
Raja Braj Dev		1781 – 1787	
Raja Sampuran Dev		1787 – 1797	
Raja Jit Dev		1797 – 1808 or 1812	
Direct Sikh Rule		1808 or 1812 – 1820	
Raja Kishore Singh		1820 – 1822	
Raja Gulab Singh		1822 – 1846	

== Under Sikh rule ==
=== Direct rule ===
Jammu State was annexed by the Sikh Empire in 1808 or 1812, the smaller states of Basohli and others soon followed and fell to the Sikhs. Kharak Singh's agents were unable to maintain law and order, with locals led by Mian Dedo rebelling against the Sikh jagirdar (governor). In 1812, the Dogra commander Gulab Singh led the Sikh forces against Kashmir and assisted their attacks on Multan in 1819 and against the Pashtun Yousafzai.

=== Hereditary fiefdom ===
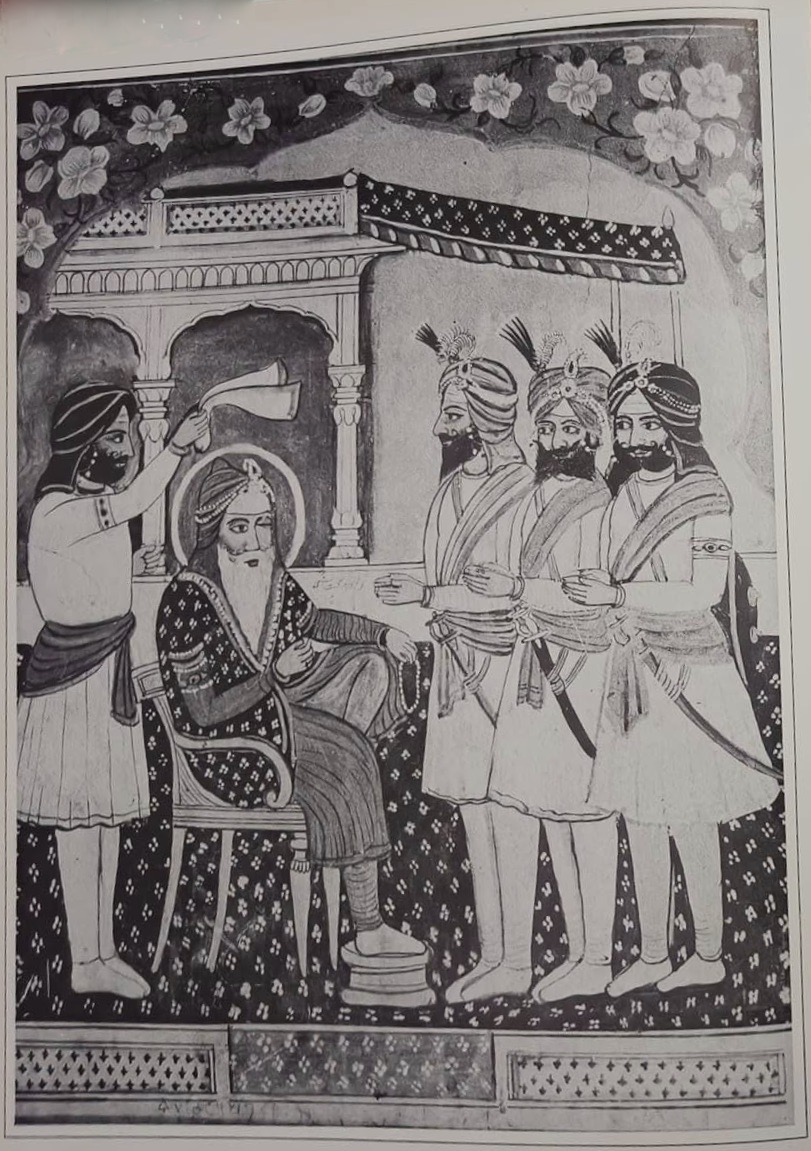
Fresco depicting Maharaja Ranjit Singh with the three Dogra brothers, namely Dhian Singh, Gulab Singh, and Suchet Singh, circa 19th century

In 1820, Ranjit Singh then bestowed the territory as a hereditary fiefdom to Gulab Singh's father Kishore Singh, a distant kinsman of Raja Jit Singh. Ranjit Singh bestowed the place as a jagir on Kishore Singh, who belonged to the Jamwal Rajput clan that ruled Jammu. Kishore Singh was introduced to Ranjit Singh by his son Gulab Singh, who had joined Ranjit Singh's army in 1809. Upon this introduction, Ranjit Singh employed Kishore Singh and two brothers of Gulab Singh, Suchet Singh and Dhian Singh. During Sikh-rule, the three Dogra brothers Suchet Singh, Gulab Singh, and Dhian Singh played prominent roles in the Sikh court, with all of them being descended from Surat Dev.

On his father's death in 1821 or 1822, Jammu passed to Gulab Singh. Gulab Singh was the son of Kishore Singh, grandson of Zorawar Singh, great-grandson of Surat Dev, and great-great-grandson of Raja Dhruv Dev of Jammu. Dhian Singh eventually worked his way up and reached the position of prime minister of the Sikh Empire in 1828. Dhian Singh was given control over Poonch State and was bestowed the jagirs of Jasrota, Basholi, and Bhadu. Suchet Singh was given Ramnagar as a raja. At various points, Gulab Singh was bestowed with the jagirs of Bhera, Miani, Qadirabad, Dangi, Pind Dadda Khan, Jhelum, and Gujarat.

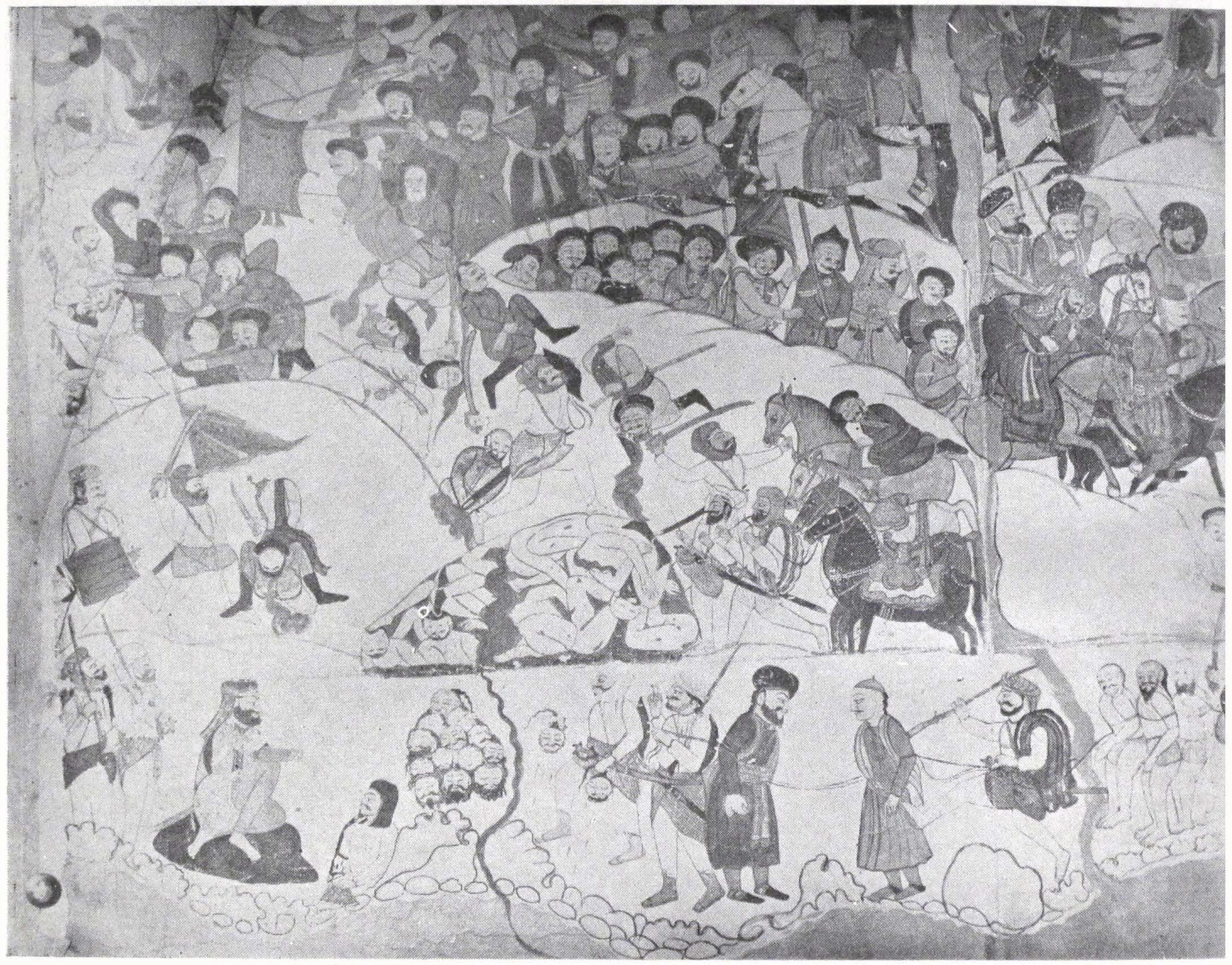
'A battle scene' (second), from a painted scroll documenting the invasions of Ladakh, Baltistan, and Western Tibet, ca.1840's

As a jagirdar (governor) for the Sikhs, Gulab Singh extended the boundaries of the Sikh Empire to western Tibet with the help of his fine General Zorawar Singh. Gulab Singh conquered the states of Kashtwar, Mankotia, Chenehni, Bandralta, and Padar (a minor province of Chamba State). The Sikh rule was then extended beyond the Jammu Region and the Kashmir Valley to include the Tibetan Buddhist kingdom of Ladakh (conquered in 1834) and the Emirates of Hunza, Gilgit and Nagar.

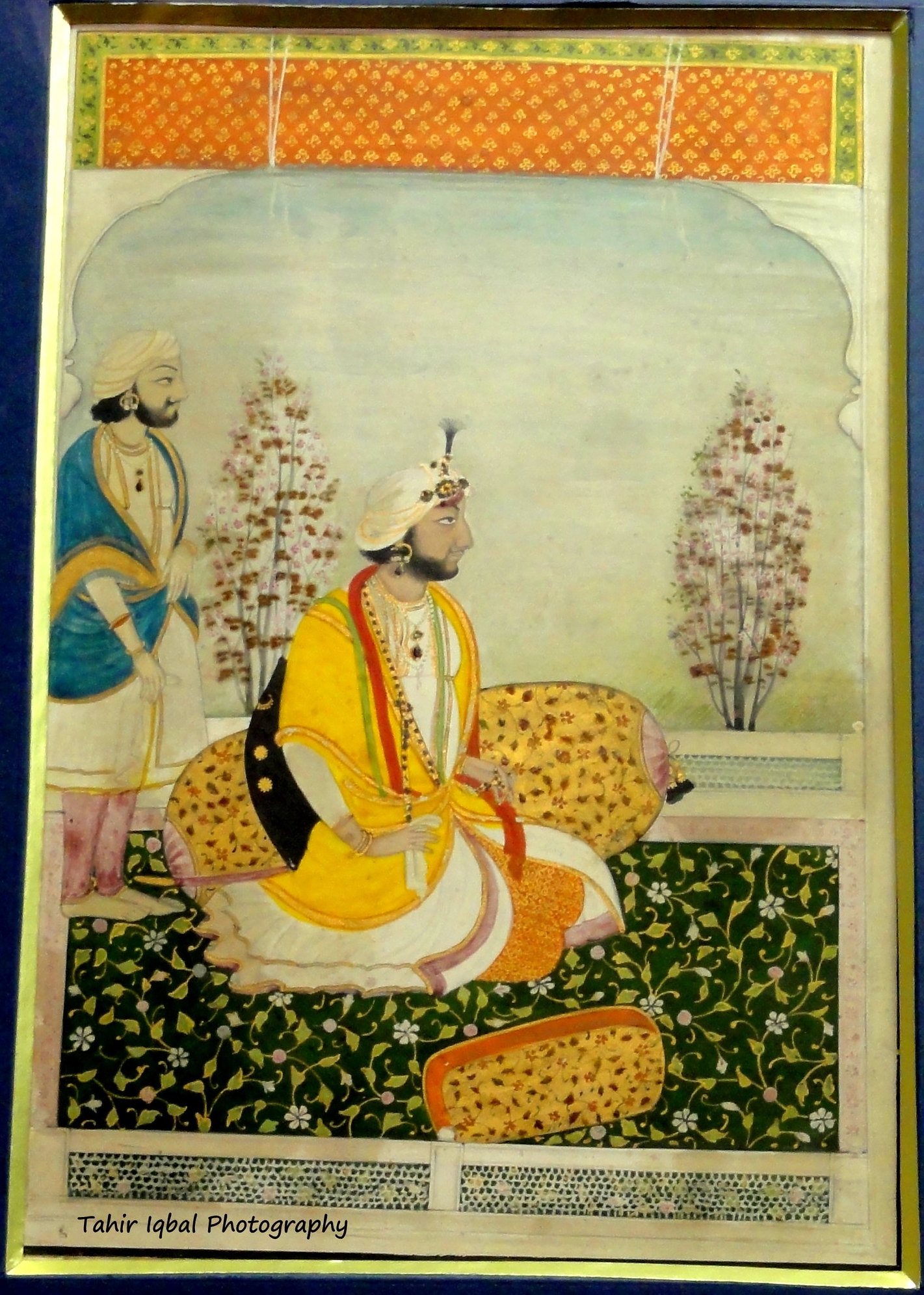
Miniature painting of Udham Singh, son of Gulab Singh, leaning against a bolster with an attendant

Gulab Singh had been a loyal and faithful subject of Ranjit Singh during the ruler's life, however after the death of Ranjit in 1839, conspiracies, rivalries, and intrigues arose in the Sikh court, with varying factions vying against one another for their own benefit. In the turmoil for succession of the Sikh empire that followed Maharaja Ranjit Singh's death in 1839, two of Gulab Singh's sons Udham Singh, and Sohan Singh were killed in the feuding between the Sikh heirs. His youngest brother Suchet Singh, was killed by his own nephew Hira Singh, the Vizir (prime minister) of the Sikh empire. Hira Singh, was a great favourite of Maharaja Ranjit Singh and Gulab Singh once even aspired to have him installed as the Sikh emperor. Hira Singh had become prime minister aged 24, after his father and Gulab Singh's brother Vizir Dhian Singh was assassinated in his blotched September 1843 coup d'état against Sikh emperor Sher Singh in Lahore. During the regency of Maharani Jind Kaur, Hira Singh was killed by the Sikh army in December 1844. Another son of Gulab Singh, named Randhir Singh, was killed during this time. During this period of turmoil, the Sikh Khalsa Army invaded Jammu and brought Gulab Singh back to Lahore as a prisoner, partly because Gulab Singh had taken precious treasures and resources from the Punjab when he shifted to Jammu after he defended Chand Kaur from Sher Singh. Gulab Singh managed to survive this time and returned to Jammu.

Gulab Singh, came into possession of the Koh-i-noor diamond, after Maharaja Kharak Singh's mysterious death in prison in 1840, and had previously presented the famous stone to Maharaja Sher Singh to win his favour.

After the First Anglo-Sikh War in 1846, Sir Henry Lawrence was appointed British Resident and Vizir Lal Singh on behalf of infant emperor Duleep Singh was asked to surrender Kashmir. Vizir Lal Singh was also a Dogra, and along with Gulab Singh colluded with the British to deliberately break the Sikh army and facilitate the British victory.

Under the terms of the Treaty of Amritsar that followed in March 1846, the British government sold Kashmir for a sum of 7.5 million Nanakshahee rupees to Gulab Singh, hereafter bestowed with the title of Maharaja. Thus the Princely State of Jammu and Kashmir came into being under Gulab Singh, as per the treaty of Lahore, signed between the British and the Sikhs. Gulab Singh had to pay a large indemnity to the British on behalf of the Sikhs.

== Jammu and Kashmir State ==
Maharaja Partab Singh (enthroned in 1885) saw the construction of Banihal Cart Road (B.C. Road) mainly to facilitate telegraph services. During WWI he provided one Mountain Battery and three Infantry Battalions to fight for the British in East Africa, Palestine and Mesopotamia. For the services of his troops the state was awarded a hereditary 21-guns salute.

One of the main residences of the maharajas was the Sher Garhi Palace in their summer capital Srinagar.

=== Maharaja Hari Singh ===
The last ruler of Jammu and Kashmir was Maharaja Hari Singh, who ascended the throne in 1925. He made primary education compulsory in the State, introduced laws prohibiting child marriage and allowed low castes to go to places of worship. Hari Singh was as a member of Churchill's British War Cabinet in WWII, and supplied troops for the Allies.

Singh's reign saw the accession of Jammu and Kashmir to the newly independent Indian Union in 1947. He originally manoeuvered to maintain his independence by playing India and Pakistan off against each other. There was an armed movement against the Maharaja's rule, especially in the Poonch district of Jammu, where his troops were unable to control the fighters and retreated to Jammu. In October 1947, Singh appealed to India for help and acceded Jammu to India, although there is considerable controversy over exactly at what point, and whether or not his accession included the sovereignty of the state.

In June 1952, Singh's rule was terminated by the state government of Indian-administered Kashmir. His son Yuvraj (Crown Prince) Karan Singh too abdicated and was elected Sadr-e-Riyasat ('President of the Province') and Governor of the state in 1964.

=== Since 1952 ===
Yuvraj (Crown Prince) Karan Singh after serving as the President of Jammu and Kashmir from 1952 to 1964 went on to become the youngest cabinet minister as a leading member of the Indian Congress Party in 1967. He was also the Indian ambassador to the US in 1989. His elder son Vikramaditya Singh was a member of the Peoples Democratic Party. Currently in Congress party, Karan Singh's younger son Ajatshatru Singh was a member of the National Conference (NC) headed by Omar Abdullah, grandson of Sheikh Abdullah who had abolished the monarchy in 1952. Ajatshatru Singh had served with the NC as a minister in the Jammu and Kashmir Government from 1996 to 2002. In 2014 he quit the NC to join the BJP, stating that he had done so to satisfy the "people's desire to have a corruption and dynasty-free government".

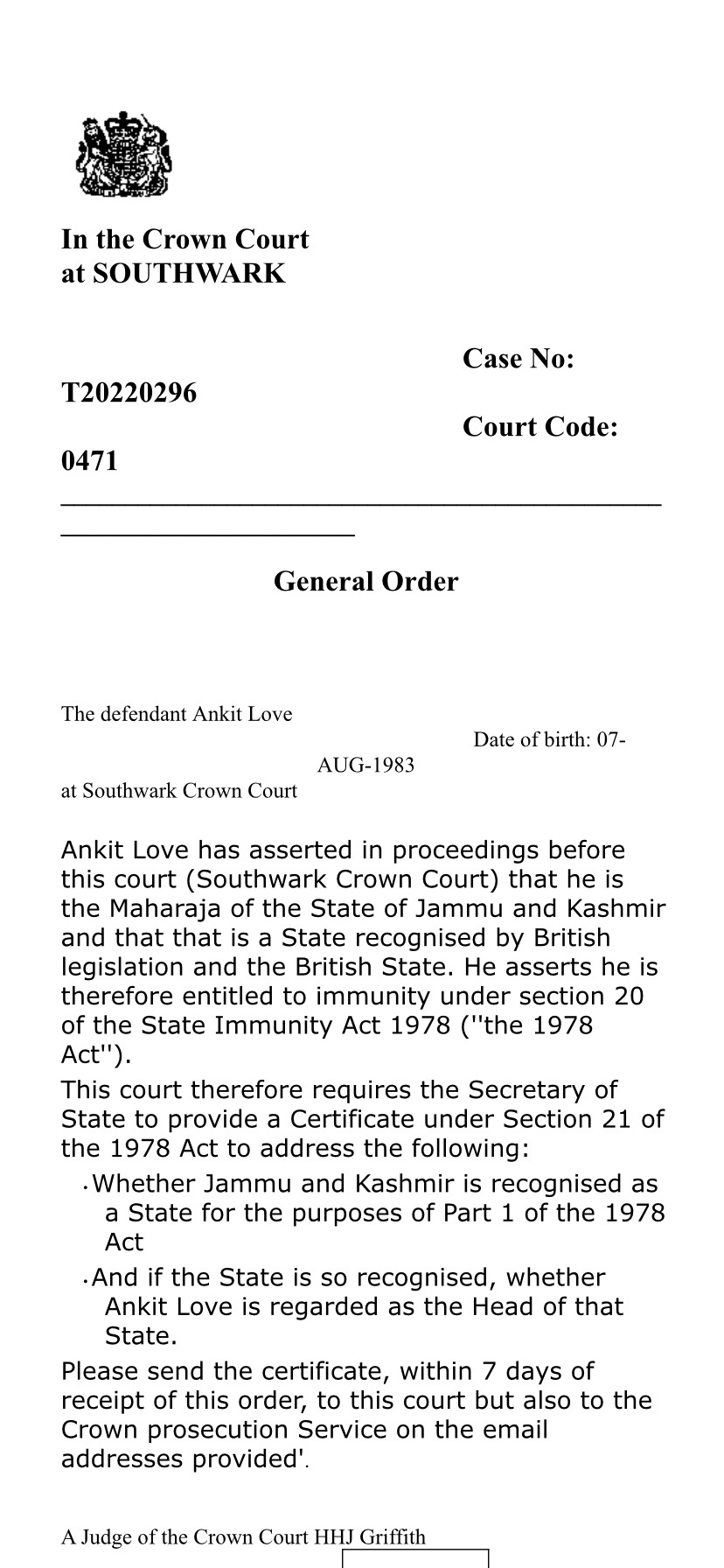
United Kingdom Crown Court order against the Secretary of State of the Foreign and Commonwealth office to address whether Jammu and Kashmir is recognised as a state

Ankit Love, son of Bhim Singh the founder of the Jammu and Kashmir National Panthers Party, claimed to be the "Emperor (Maharaja) of the Sovereign State of Jammu and Kashmir" when he was a candidate in the 2016 London Mayoral Election, and again in the 2016 Richmond Park by-election for the United Kingdom parliament. In 2022, Ankit Love asserted in Southwark Crown Court in the United Kingdom, that he was the Maharaja of Jammu and Kashmir and had judge Griffith issue a court order against the Secretary of State to provide under Section 21 of the State Immunity 1978 Act a certificate to address whether Jammu and Kashmir is recognised as a state.

== List of rulers and family tree ==
This is a list of rulers of State of Jammu and Kashmir from 1846 to 1952 CE.

Ruler	Portrait	Reign
Maharaja Gulab Singh		16 March 1846 – 20 February 1856
Maharaja Ranbir Singh		20 February 1856 – 12 September 1885
Maharaja Pratap Singh		12 September 1885 – 23 September 1925
Maharaja Hari Singh		12 September 1925 – 17 November 1952 (Note: Monarchy abolished.)

=== Family tree ===
- I. Gulab Singh, Maharaja of Jammu and Kashmir (1792–1857; Maharaja: 1846 (abdicated 1856))
  - II. Ranbir Singh, Maharaja of Jammu and Kashmir GCSI, CIE (1830–1885; r. 1856–1885)
    - III. Pratap Singh, Maharaja of Jammu and Kashmir GCSI, GCIE, GBE (1848–1925; r. 1885–1925)
    - Raja Amar Singh KCSI (1864–1909)
      - IV. Hari Singh, Maharaja of Jammu and Kashmir GCSI, GCIE, GCVO (1895–1961; r. 1925–1947; titular Maharaja: 1952–1961)
        - V. Karan Singh, President of Jammu and Kashmir (b. 1931; Regent of Jammu and Kashmir: 1949–1952; Sadar-e-Riyasat (President) of Jammu and Kashmir: 1952–1965; Governor of Jammu and Kashmir: 1965–1967;
          - Vikramaditya Singh (born 1964)
            - Martand Singh (b. 1992)
          - Ajatshatru Singh (born 1966)
            - Ranvijay Singh (born 1992)

==== Family chart ====
Family tree of the Maharajas of Jammu and Kashmir

Gulab Singh^{(1)} r. 1846-1856
Ranbir Singh^{(2)} r. 1856-1885
Pratap Singh^{(3)} r. 1885-1925	Amar Singh
Hari Singh^{(4)} r. 1925-1952
Karan Singh; Prince; Regent; 1949-1952

== Patronage of the arts ==
No Dogra artwork from before the Mughal-era has been found or been preserved. At the height of the reign of the Dogras, artists were patronized and temples and fortresses were decorated with mural paintings, such as the temples of Krimchi, Babbor, and in the fort at Bahu. Artwork flourished under the Dogras due to two main reasons: contact with the Mughals and the ascendance of the Jammu State. Exchanges between the Dogras and the Mughals led to the transmission of Mughal manners, methods, and tastes regarding artwork, to the Dogras. The first Pahari ruler to directly interact with the Mughals was Raja Bhupat Pal of Basohli State (r. 1598–1635), who was imprisoned by Jahangir from 1613–1627, during which he likely witnessed Mughal artwork. This led to the art of painting to arise first in Basohli State, with the successors Raja Sangram Pal (r. 1635–73) and Raja Kirpan Pal (r. 1678–93) further developing Basohli as a centre of painting. The tradition of painting later developed in the hill states of Jasrota, Mankot, Lakhanpur, Samba, Bhoti, Bandralta, Bhadrawaha, Poonch, and Rajauri.

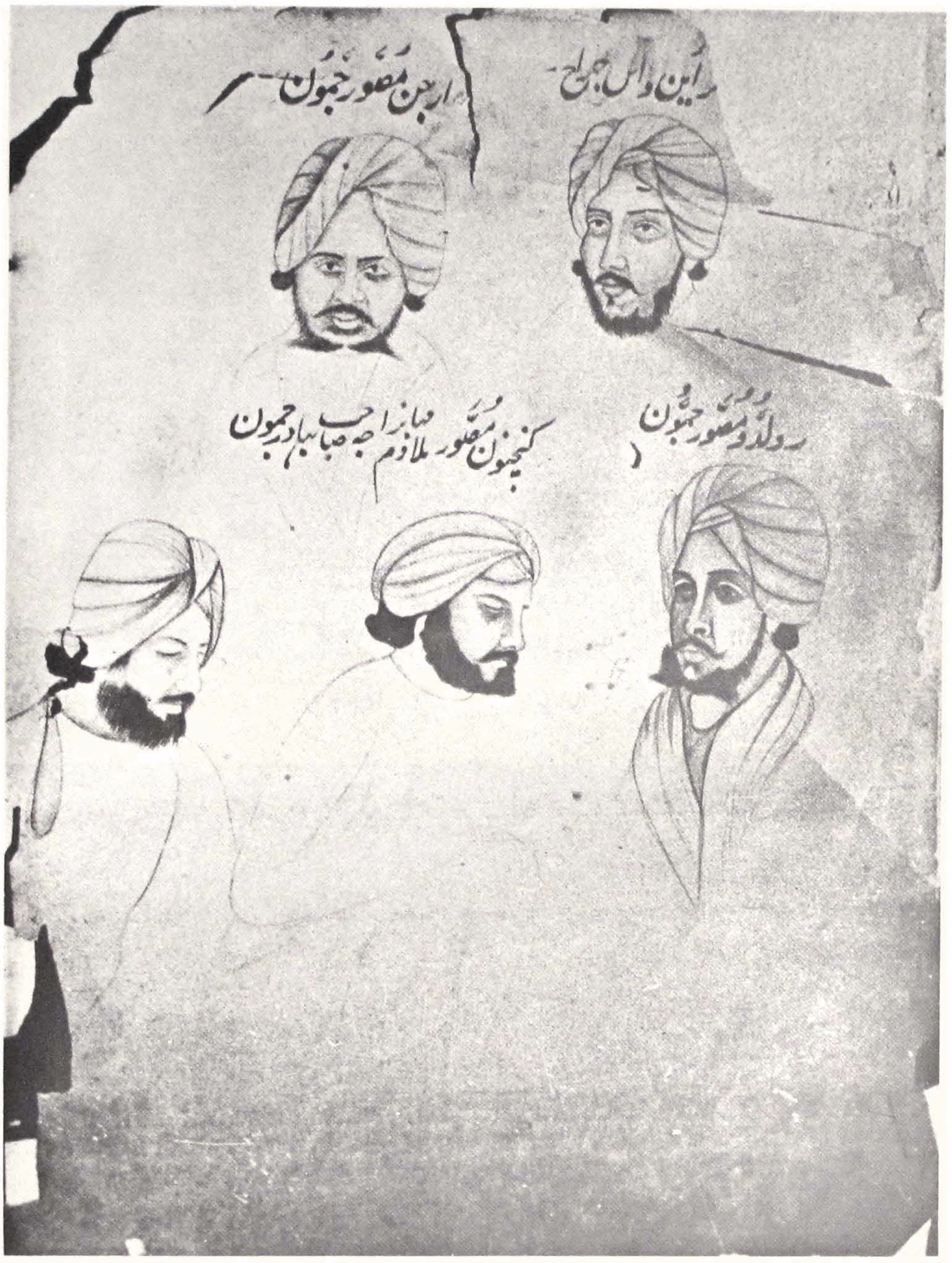
Portrait of the three artists Arjun, Ruldu, and Kanchu, whom were employed by the court of Ranbir Singh of Jammu and Kashmir State

As for Jammu State, the first paintings seem to date to the reign of Raja Hari Dev (r. 1660–90). As Jammu became a powerful and hegemonic entity within the region above the rest, this brought upon peace, prosperity, and stability, which attracted painters to the Jammuite court, leading to the developing of Jammu State as a painting centre in the hills region. Raja Dhruv Dev's four sons were all patrons of painting, especially Raja Balwant Singh of Jasrota State. When Mughal officials sought refuge in Jammu State, they possibly brought Mughal miniature paintings with them and had an impact on the local fashion of Jammu, which is revealed in the miniature paintings produced after their arrival. The extant wall-paintings of the territories of J&K State all date back to the reign of Gulab Singh, however there are miniature paintings that pre-date this time. The brothers of Gulab Singh, Dhian Singh and Suchet Singh, were patrons of wall-paintings. Gubab Singh's son and successor, Ranbir Singh, kept an atelier of artists. The Dogra nobles were rich in wealth, this allowed them to pay for the patronization of artists. Petty Rajputs and aristocrats also emulated the royal-class by patronizing artists. The patrons of temple construction, usually the mercantile-classes belonging to the Vaishya varna that were engaged in trade and industry, had the temple walls decorated with murals.

Many of the extant Dogra wall paintings cover religious themes as this was the primary reason for executing them, to pay respect to the divinity of the deity, area, or temple. Vaishnavism, Shaivism, and Shaktism (especially veneration of Vaishno Devi) were prominent streams of Hinduism amongst the Dogras and local people. The worship of Vishnu and his avatars can be evinced in the early portraits of the Jammuite rulers Raja Ananta Dev and Raja Dhruv Dev, who bear Vaishnavist-orientated tilaks in their painted portraits. During the Sikh-period in Jammu, the Jammuite nobles venerated the Sikh gurus and respected the Guru Granth Sahib, with them patronizing the painting of Sikh themes, such as paintings depicting Guru Nanak.

However, there are secular paintings related to hunting, which was a popular past-time that involved many members of the noble-class, officials, and even the commoners. Other secular themes relate to music and dance, which is evident from murals found at Ramnagar Palace. Since miniature paintings often were part of dowries, artists would often travel with princesses to various royal courts of the surrounding region. Commoner women acted as models for artists as noble women did not appear before artists for this purpose. There are few to nil cases of other castes patronizing wall paintings, however a temple at Purmandal was constructed under the purview of a Brahmin and was decorated with murals but this Brahmin was engaged in a trading profession in Gujarat rather than traditional Brahmin customs.

Some prominent artisan families that were employed by the Dogra rulers are the Seu-Nainsukh family. The Seu-Nainsukh family was the dominant artisan family in the hill states of the Western Himalayas during the 18th and 19th centuries, including in Jammu. Seu's son, Nainsukh, was directly employed by Balwant Singh of Jasrota, whom was the youngest son of Raja Dhruv Dev of Jammu State. Nainsukh later moved to Basohli to work under that state's patronage. Nainsukh and his son Ranjha (also an artist) worked under Raja Amrit Pal of Basohli State in the mid-18th century. Ranjha's sons, Gur Sahai and Sukh Dayal, went to Jammu State to work as artists. Three artists named Arjun, Ruldu, and Kanchu worked under the patronage of Ranbir Singh's court. A prominent artist of late 19th century Jammu was Jagat Ram Dube, who was nicknamed as Chuniya and was of a Brahmin background. Another artist was Haricharan, possibly a member of the family of the artist Sajnu who worked under Mandi State patronage. As per lore, a Tarkhan artist named Hiru mistri of Suneeta village was the one who carried out the painting work of the walls of Ramnagar Palace. Three artisan families based out of the Kangra region had sent their sons to work under Jammuite patronage but there is no evidence that they carried-out mural work.

The Dogra wall paintings of that era were likely painted by more than one person, with the artisan families possibly travelling from place-to-place in a nomadic fashion, such as by working in one house and then moving to another to work when the work is completed. The walls of the Ram-Ji-Ka-Mandir were painted by artists who hailed from Jaipur. The local Radhakrishna temple of Mule Chak, Jammu region were painted by Muslims, with a Muslim painter named Aziz known to have worked in the vicinity. Traditional architects tended to have knowledge of executing wall paintings. Artists were paid in the form of grain for their services but ones attached to the royal-courts were paid in-cash. Examples of land deeds bestowed upon any particular artists have not been found in this region. When the Jammuite rulers would leave for religious pilgrimages, such as the tirth-yatra, such as to Prayag, Haridwar, or Gaya, their artists would accompany them, as evidenced by the genealogical registers present at popular religious destinations, such as the bahis of the pandas in Haridwar.

== See also ==
- Jammu and Kashmir
- Kashmir region
- List of Hindu Empires and Dynasties

== Bibliography ==
- Schofield, Victoria (2003) [First published in 2000], Kashmir in Conflict, London and New York: I. B. Taurus & Co, ISBN 1860648983
