= Deva dynasty of Jammu =

Dynasty of north-west India

- c.850–1812
- Demonym: Jammuites
- History
  - Established: c.850
  - Annexation by the Sikh Empire: 1812
Succeeded by
Sikh Empire
- Today part of: India

The Dev Dynasty (alt. Spelling: Deva) was a dynasty of Jammu that ruled for many centuries in the Jammu region between the Chenab and Ravi rivers. It was one of the many Hill States of the Indian subcontinent. It arose in circa 850 and in 1812, Jammu was annexed by the Sikh Empire.

== History ==
In around the year 850, the Dogras came to power in Jammu, being established by Raja Bhuj or Bhuj Dev. The centres of power for the Dogra rulers at this era were Bahu, Babbapura (Babor), and Jammu. The first historical mention to a Pahari ruler relates to two copper-plate inscription dated to the years 1056 and 1066 that eulogize the feats of Raja Sahilavarman of Chamba State (r. 920–940).

The earliest type of administration in the region consisted of reigns by feudal chieftains, referred to as a thakur or rana. This form of government gradually shifted to one that was hereditary based on primogeniture, leading to the formation of dynasties. These states often warred with one another, absorbing or being absorbed by other states, with the winner usually being the stronger state and the loser the smaller one. By the tenth century, the following prominent Dogra states arose in the Pahari Hills region of the Western Himalayas:

- Jammu – ruled by the Jamwal clan
- Mankot – ruled by the Mankotia clan
- Jasrota – ruled by the Jasrotia clan
- Lakhanpur – ruled by the Lakhanpuria clan
- Samba – ruled by the Sambial clan
- Tirikot – ruled by the Tiri Kotia clan
- Akhnur – ruled by the Akhnuria clan
- Riasi – ruled by the Riasial clan
- Dalpatpur – ruled by the Dalpatia clan
- Bhau – ruled by the Bhauwal clan
- Bhoti – ruled by the Bhatial clan
- Chenehni – ruled by the Hantal clan
- Bandralta – ruled by the Bandral clan
- Basholi – ruled by the Balauria clan
- Bhadrawaha – ruled by the Bhadrawahia clan
- Bhadu – ruled by the Bhaduwal clan
- Kashtwar – ruled by the Kashtwaria clan
- Punch – ruled by the Manjwal clan
- Kotli – ruled by the Mangral clan
- Rajauri – ruled by the Jarral clan

Mahmud of Ghazni's army passed through the Punjab and invaded Poonch State, however he did not attack Jammu State and the polity was spared from fighting. There is a mention in Kalhana's Rajatarangini of three Dogra rulers, namely Kirti and Vajradhara of Babbapura and Umadhara. All three of these rulers are also mentioned in the Vansavali (genealogy) of the Jammu ruling house, albeit with minor variations. The Jammu rulers were close with the Kashmiri rulers, such as during the reign of Kalasa and Bhikshachara. The Dogra-ruler Vajradhara is said to have allied with Trigarta (Kangra), Vallapura (Balaor), Vartula (Batal), and Thakkuras of the Chandrabhaga Valley, to pledge allegiance to Bhikshachara of Kashmir. Bhikshachara asceded to the throne of Kashmir in 1120.

In the autobiography of Timur from 1399, known as the Malfuzat-i-Timuri, there is a reference to a ruler of Jammu ("Raja-Jammu") but no mention of their specific name is given but it would have been Raja Mal Dev of Jammu who resisted the Timurids. (Note: Raja Mal Dev's name is also rendered as 'Raja Maldev'.) This is the first mention of the region of Jammu in recorded-history. According to the Timurid account, Jammu was invaded and Raja Bhim was converted to Islam. The Timurid account mentions that large amounts of booty that consisted of grain and property were taken from Jammu by them. However, these early contracts with Islamic polities did not leave any lasting impression on Jammu until the rule of the Mughals. Raja Mal Dev was the fourth ruler of the Dev dynasty and he ruled Jammu from 1361 to 1400, establishing his headquarters at Purani Madi. After Raja Mal Dev, between the years 1400 to 1733, ten descendants of Raja Mal Dev ruled Jammu. For some centuries, the Jammu-Babbapura rulers would reign nearly independently and supported the Sultans of Delhi. Raja Hamir or Bhim Dev was recorded as being a supporter of Mubarak Shah (r. 1421–1434) of the Sayyid dynasty of the Delhi Sultanate against the Khokhars of the Darvabhisara Hills.

With the oncoming of the Mughal empire, the Jammuite rulers resisted their attempts overwhelm them but finally succumbed once they could reach favourable terms. The Mughals were aggressive toward the small states of the Western Himalayas, with Akbar declaring himself as their sovereign ruler. Twenty-two of the hill states recognized the sovereignty of Akbar and each dispatched a local prince to the Mughal court. The princes would effectively be hostages to ensure that the small hill states would act courteous to the Mughal authority. However, the hill states often resisted the Mughals and rose up in rebellion against them, such is the case with Jammu State, which rose in insurrection against the Mughals on three separate instances during this time: the first between the years 1588–9, the second between 1594 and 1595, and the third from 1616 to 1617.

During the reign of Akbar between the years 1594–95, the Jammu ruler Raja Parasram Dev teamed-up with fellow Pahari rulers Rai Pratap of Jasrota and Rai Balbhadra of Lakhanpur in a rebellion against the Mughals, which raged from Kangra to the Jammu Hills. As per the Ain-i-Akbari, Raja Sangram Dev of Jammu was against Raja Man, viceroy of Lahore, with him slaying Raja Man in 1616–17 during the reign of emperor Jahangir. During the reigns of the Mughal emperors Shah Jahan and Aurangzeb, Dogra relations with the Mughals had pacified, with the vansavali recording that Rajas Bhup Dev (r. 1624–1650) and Raja Hari Dev (r. 1650–1686) were employed as mansabdars by the Mughals. However, not all of the hill chiefs were amicable to the Mughals still, as the rulers of Basohli State, resisted them further between 1635 and 1673, whilst the Mughal forces were commanded by Zain Khan Koka. Raja Hari Dev died in 1686 during the Deccani campaigns of Aurangzeb.

The successor of Hari Dev, who was Raja Gaje Dev (r. 1686–1707), moved toward re-establishing the independence of Jammu from the Mughals. His successor, Raja Dhruv Dev, worked toward the same ambition.

=== Dhruv Dev ===
Raja Dhruv Dev ruled from 1707 until 1733. During his tenure Battle of Jammu (1712) was fought in which he sided with Mughals to defeat Banda Singh Bahadur. According to the Rajdarshani, a historical chronicle by 19th-century historian Ganeshdas Badenra, the Mubarak Mandi palace was founded when Raja Dhruv Dev in 1710, after consulting his astrologers, moved his residence from the older palace in Purani Mandi to a new, grander location overlooking the Tawi River.

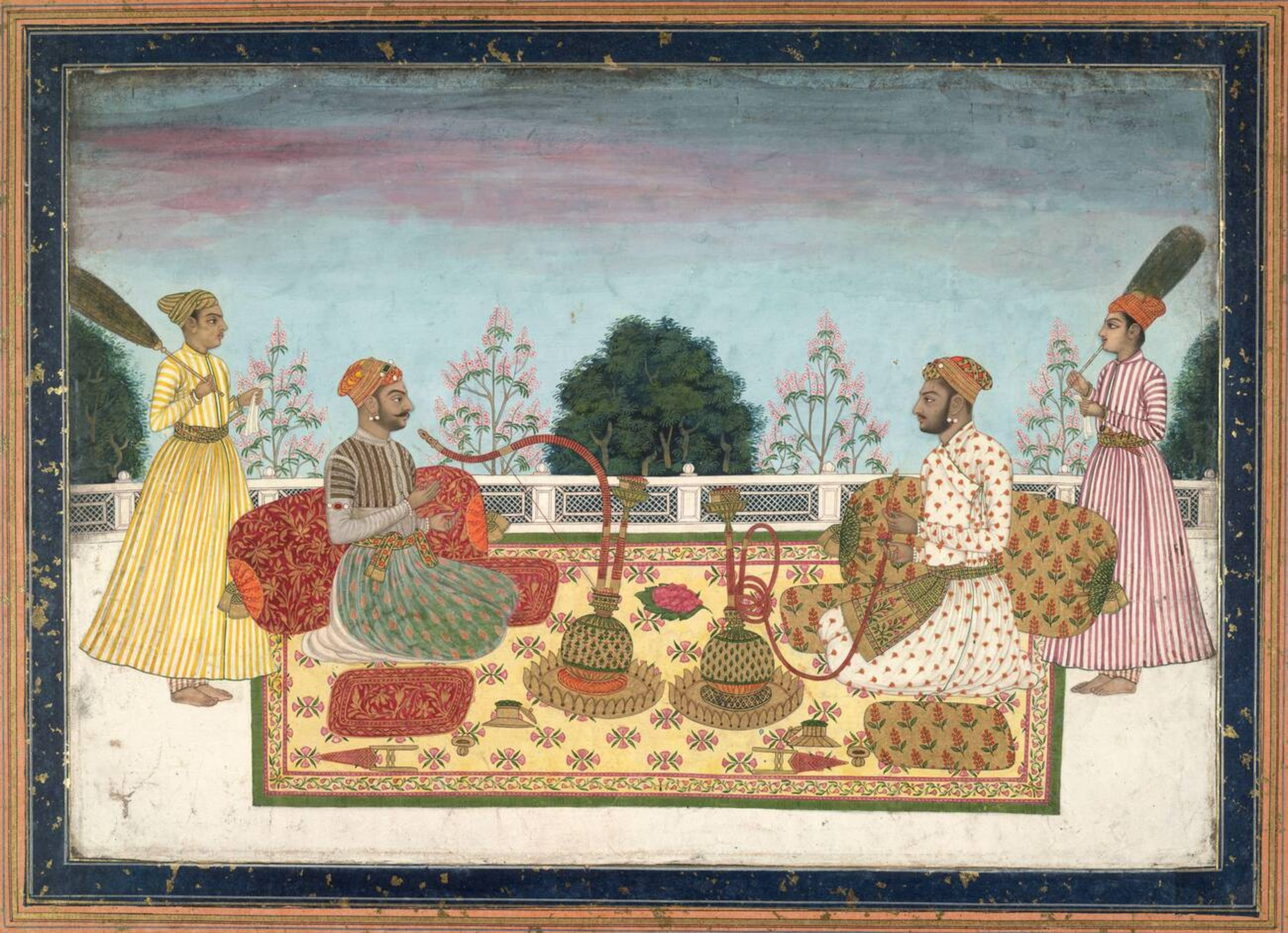
Painting of Raja Anand Dev of Bahu State seated with Raja Dhruv Dev of Jammu State, by Patak Chand, ca.1770

Jammu was a small principality until the decline of Mughal authority in the early 18th century, where-after it arose to become a regional powerhouse during the reign of Raja Dhruv Dev. Jammu was ruled by the Dev Dynasty, which descends from Raja Mal Dev. Raja Dhruv Dev laid down the foundations of the Jamwal rulers of Jammu in 1703. During the reign of Dhruv Dev, Jammu was unified and it established authority and dominance over the other surrounding Hill States. The other hill states of Jasrota, Basohli, Mankot, and Bandralta were brought under Jammu's writ under Raja Dhruv Dev. The Sikh guru Guru Gobind Singh and warrior Banda Singh Bahadur found refuge in the Jammu Hills region when in conflict with the Mughals.

Raja Dhruv Dev had four sons: Ranjit Dev, Ghansar Dev, Surat Dev, and Balwant Dev. (Note: Balwant Dev is commonly known as 'Balwant Singh'.) Ranjit Dev was the successor to the Jammu throne whilst Balwant Dev was given control over the jagir of Sarunisar. Balwant Dev was the patron of Pahari artists, such as Nainsukh. Surat Dev, the third son of Dhruv Dev, was married to two women, one from the Slahria clan of Bara Pind, and the other from the Chibs of Batala. Surat Dev would go-on to produce four sons with these two wives: Zorawar Singh, Mian Mota, Bhulla, and Dulla. Zorawar Singh was granted the jagir of Deval. Zorawar Singh would later marry a Jit Rajput women of Charhai whilst Mian Mota married into the family of Raja Jai Singh Jaswal. Zorawar Singh's son was named Kishore Singh, with Kishore later marrying a Bhadwal woman from Marhta in Basohli tehsil. Kishore's son was Gulab Singh.

=== Ghansar Dev ===
Ghansar Dev, also known as Ghansar Chand, was the second son of Dhruv Dev and was born in ca.1715 (or perhaps earlier). He occupied the regency of Jammu State from 1735 to 1747, as Ranjit Dev had been arrested and imprisoned at Lahore between the years 1735–1747 due to the Mughals suspecting him of being disloyal to their governor of the hill region, therefore Ghansar served as regent in his elder brother's absence. Traditionally, the region of Jammu was divided into two states that were based on either side of the Tawi river: Bahu State and Jammu State. During the reign of Ghansar, Bahu State ceased to be an independent entity for unclear reasons and was absorbed into Jammu State.

=== Ranjit Dev ===
As per the Encyclopedia of Sikhism, Ranjit Dev ruled Jammu State from 1733 to 1781. According to R. L. Mehta, Ranjit Dev ruled Jammu from 1750 to 1781. The Battle of Jammu (1774) was fought in his reign. During his time Jammu became a tributary of Jhanda Singh of Bhangi Misl.

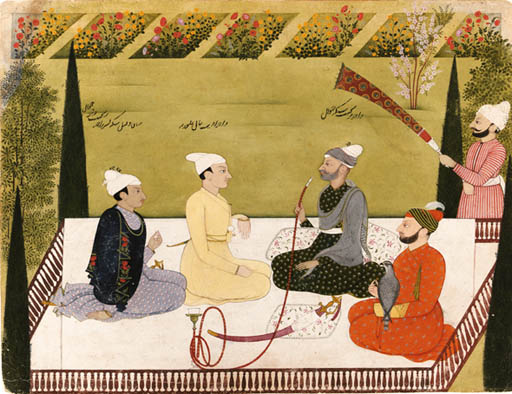
Painting of Raja Amrit Pal of Basohli State with Raja Ranjit Dev of Jammu State and two of his sons, Jammu, ca.1765. Brij Raj Dev, the future successor, is wearing red and holding a hawk, and Dalel Singh is on the far-left wearing an indigo Kashmiri shawl with poppy border.

Dhruv Dev's successor Raja Ranjit Dev (1735–1781) introduced social reforms such as the discouragement of sati (immolation of the wife on the pyre of the husband) and female infanticide. Between the years 1735–1747, Ranjit Dev was imprisoned by the Mughals at Lahore as they believed he was disloyal to the Mughal regime. After Nadir Shah invaded the Mughal Empire in 1739, it allowed Raja Ranjit Dev to further develop the independence of Jammu. During the reign of Raja Ranjit Dev, Jammu dominated twenty-two surrounding Hill States, with them becoming tributaries of Jammu, such as formerly powerful states such as Basohli, Bhadarwah, Kishtwar, and Chinaini states. This reality led to the coining of a local phrase: bāyaṅ vīch Jammu sirdār hai (meaning "Jammu is the chief of the twenty-two hill states"). The hill polity of Reasi was conquered by Jammu during his reign. Ranjit Dev had five ranis (queens), with polygamy being the norm for wealthy Dogra families.

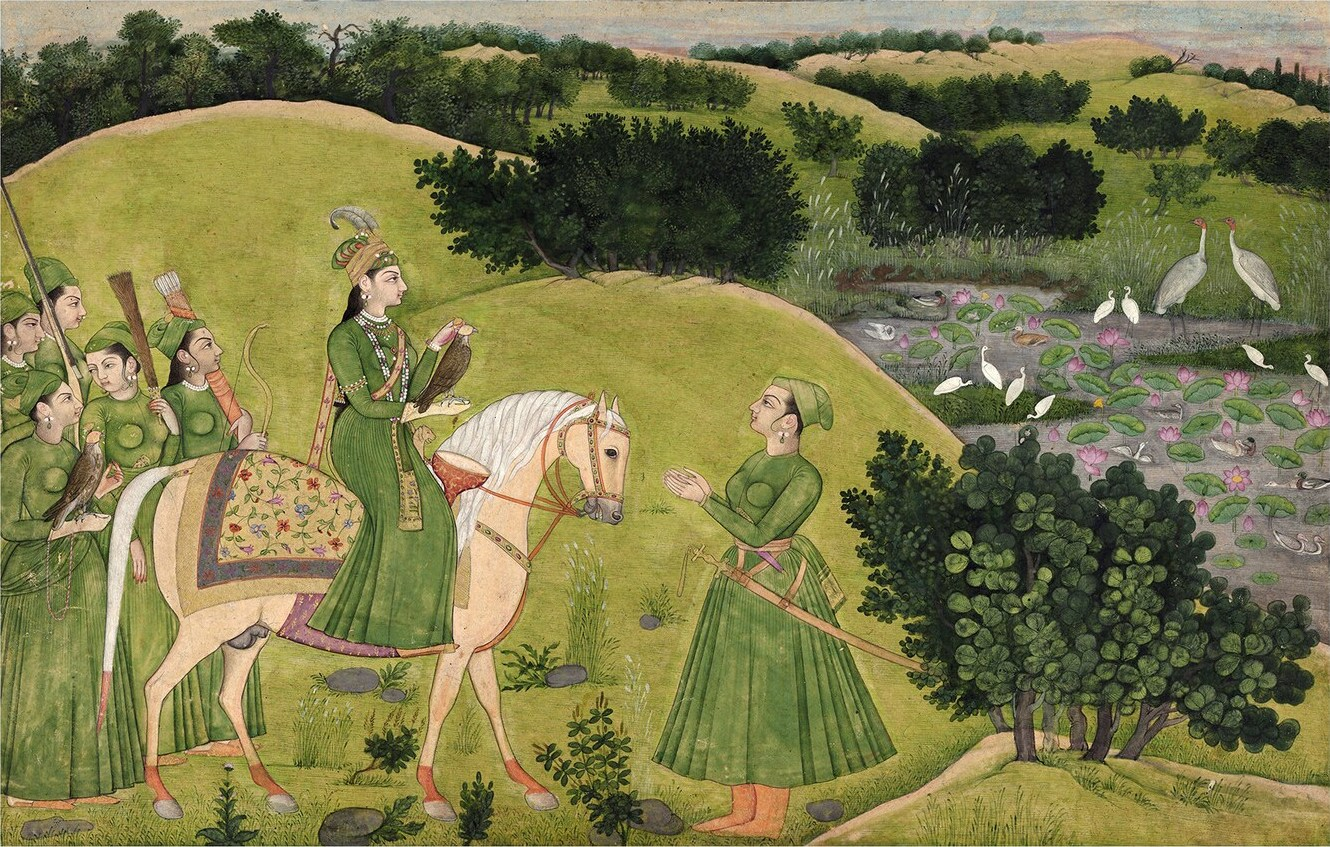
Painting of a begum out hawking with her maids, possibly a depiction of Begum Malka Zamani, attributed to Nainsukh, Jammu, ca.1735–40

Ranjit Dev, like his brother Balwant Dev, was a patron of the arts. During Ranjit's reign, Jammu's local economy benefited, as trading developed, which was noted by the English traveller George Forster in 1783. Forster also noted that the Jammuite rulers were tolerant on the matter of religion. Many refugees from other areas of India settled in Jammu during this period, such as Malka Zamani, Mughlani Begum (widow of Mir Mannu), Hari Singh (s/o Kaura Mal, the diwan of Mir Mannu), and Dalpat Rai (s/o Lakhpat Rai). Also, Sikhs would find refuge in his domain. Ranjit Dev sided with Ahmad Shah Durrani during his invasion of Kashmir. He had also sent his sons to aid Nuruddin Bamzai against Sukh Jiwan Mal in 1762. His daughter, was married to the Raja of Nurpur.

The downfall of the Mughals led the Sikh Misls to arise in the Punjab in the subsequent power-vacuum that followed, with this change having repercussions on the Hill States. The first Sikh Misl to seek power over Jammu were the Bhangis, who bordered the Jammuite kingdom from Pathankot in the east to Rawalpindi to the west. Other prevalent Sikh Misls in the region were the Kanhaiyas and Sukerchakias. In 1757, Gujjar Singh Bhangi captured Islamgarh, Poonch, and Dev Batala from Jammu. Towards the end of Ranjit Dev's rule, the Sikh clans of Punjab (misls) gained ascendency, and Jammu began to be contested by the Bhangi, Kanhaiya and Sukerchakia misls. In 1770, the Bhangi misl attacked Jammu and forced Ranjit Dev to become a tributary. Other sources state that Ranjit Dev was able to successfully fend-off the Sikh attacks on Jammu that occurred later-on in his reign and that it was his successors that succumbed to the Sikhs. In 1779, Ranjit Dev invaded Kashmir which was governed by the Afghans after being assured of local support but the attack was thwarted and the Jammu forces retreated. Ranjit Dev believed his elder son, Braj Dev, was not fit to succeed him and instead supported his younger son Dalel Singh as his immediate successor. This angered his elder son, who allied with the Sukerchakia and Kanhaiya Misls to gain the Jammu throne, while Ranjit Dev's faction (along with their Bhangi, Chamba, Nurpur, and Basohli allies) were defeated. Ranjit Dev died in 1781.

=== Braj Dev ===
Raja Braj Dev was a ruler of the Deva dynasty of Jammu, Jamwal Dogras, who ruled from 1782 to 1787. He was killed by Sikhs during a battle. During his time, the Battle of Jammu (1774) was fought which was an important battle to secure Jammu. In this battle Sikh chief Jhanda Singh Dhillon was shot dead.

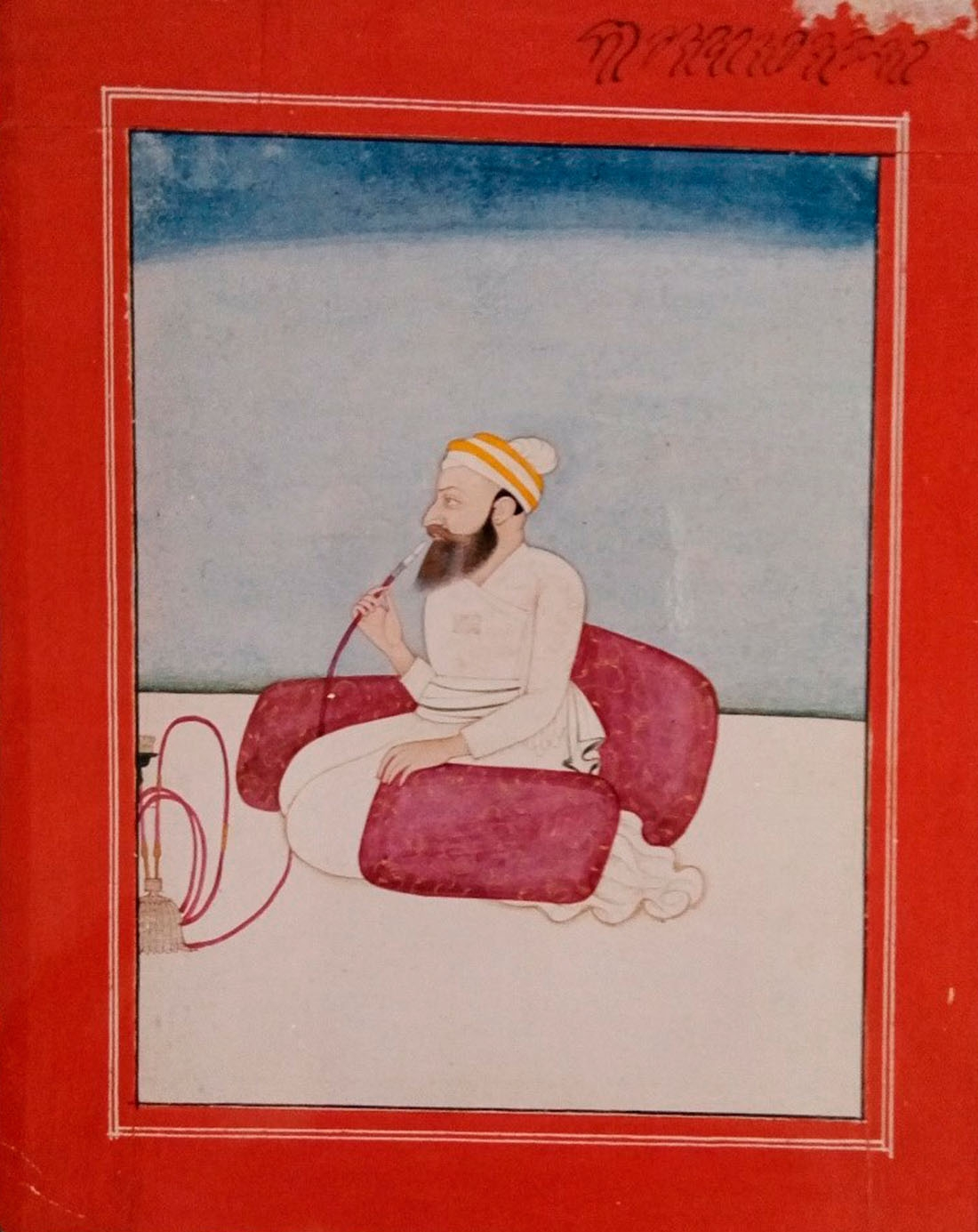
Painting of Raja Brij Raj Dev of Jammu State smoking hookah

Raja Ranjit Dev was succeeded by Raja Braj Dev, who killed his brother and nephew to become king. However, Braj Dev was an unfit ruler and eventually he became a tributary of the Sikhs. Raja Braj Dev, Ranjit Dev's successor, was defeated by the Sikh Sukerchakia chief Mahan Singh, who sacked Jammu and plundered it. Mahan Singh is said to have taken loot worth two crore rupees from Jammu. Jammu paid an annual tribute of 30,000 rupees to the Sikhs. Thus Jammu lost its supremacy over the surrounding country. In the Battle of Rumal, the Jammu ruler was killed by Sikhs. Raja Braj Dev was killed during the Sikh invasion of Jammu in 1787.

=== Sampuran Dev ===
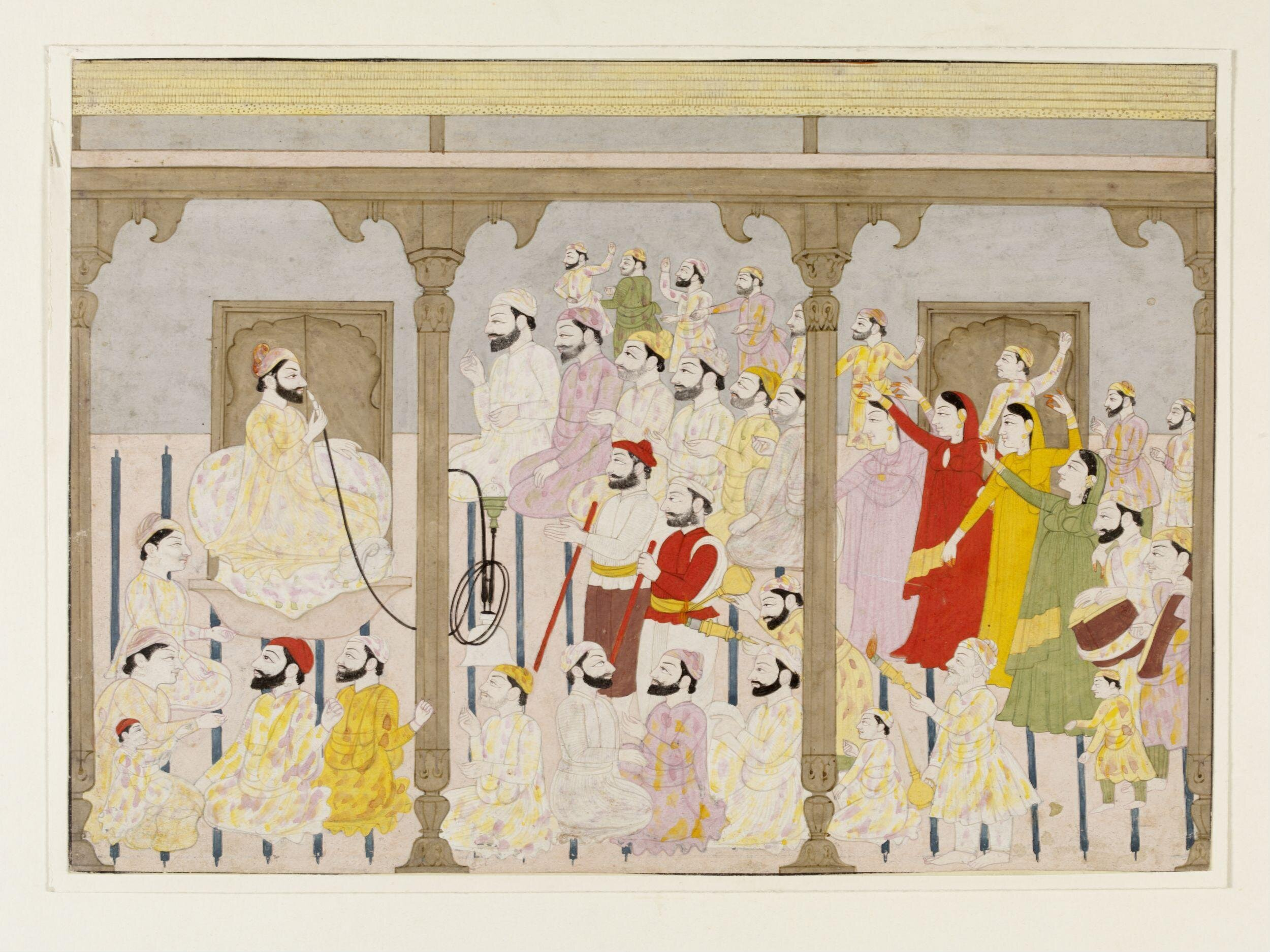
Painting of a Jammu State royal smoking hookah and watching dancing girls, ca.1790

After the death of Raja Braj Dev, the state of Jammu was heavily under the sway of the Punjabi court. His infant son Raja Sampuran Dev (1787–1797) succeeded with Jammu becoming an autonomous tributary under the Sikh Confederacy Misls. (Note: Raja Sampuran's name is alternatively appended with the Singh title, as 'Sampuran Singh', rather than as 'Sampuran Dev'.) He was a weak ruler. He surrendered Jammu to Sikhs. The young Sampuran Singh was declared as the feudal lord but would be under the watch of his uncle Mian Mota. Sampuran Singh died at the age of eleven with no issue. Thus, he was succeeded by Raja Jit Singh, who was the son of Dalel Singh. (Note: Raja Jit Singh's name is alternatively spelt as 'Jeet Singh'.)

=== Jit Dev ===
During the reign of Jit Singh (also spelled Ajit Singh), Mian Mota was granted the jagir of Purmandal. Under his reign in 1800, Ranjit Singh attacked and took Mirowal, Narowal, and Jasarwal. Rather than continuing to resist the Sikhs, Jit Singh (assisted by Mian Mota) offered 20,000 rupees and an elephant as tribute to the Sikh ruler, who in turn gave the Jammu ruler a robe of honour. The Jammu administration deteriorated into factionalism, weakening the polity. Jit Singh held little power and in actuality governance was handled by the queen Rani Bandral. Rani Bandral was opposed to the prime minister Mian Mota, banishing him to Puramadel. In the aftermath of the 1809 Treaty of Amritsar, Ranjit Singh of Lahore was restricted from expanding southward into British-protected areas so instead he turned his attention to the Pahari polities of the Himalayan foothills, with them capturing Sialkot from Jiwan Singh. While the Sikh ruler was camped at Kaluwal, his general Hukma Singh Chimni advanced on Jammu. The Jammu ruler requested Mian Mota to help defend Jammu from the Sikh invaders, who eventually agreed and gathered a force, leading to the Battle of Gumat (1808). The Jammu forces, which included Mian Dido and Gulab Singh, amongst their ranks, defeated the Sikhs who camped at the Tawi riverbank opposite of Gumat gate. Two days later, Jammu dispatched Mian Mota and Misr Diwan Chand to work out peace with the Sikhs. The peace deal worked out involved Jammu paying an annual tribute of 73,000 rupees.

==== Growing influence of the Sikhs ====
After the Battle of Gumat in 1808, the Sikhs were impressed by the valour that Gulab Singh displayed fighting on behalf of Jammu, thus the peace deal they worked out with Jammu included a request for Gulab Singh to come into the service of the Sikhs. In 1809, Gulab Singh joined the Sikh forces at Daska village, was made a regimental commander, and bestowed a monthly salary of 275 rupees. Other Dogras who found salaried service with the Sikhs were Dhian Singh and Gulab Singh's father Kishore Singh. In around 1811, Suchet Singh also found military employment with the Sikhs as a ghurcharas commander. These Dogras also received jagir grants from the Sikhs. Jit Singh was involved in another conflict with the Sikh empire, which he lost and was exiled into British territory. With Jammu fully annexed by the Sikhs around 1808, Ranjit Singh first allotted it to his son Kharak Singh. Other sources give the year 1812 as when Jammu was annexed by the Sikhs. Raja Jit Singh of Jammu was deposed as a ruler. In around June-July 1822, Raja Jit Singh of Jammu forfeited his and his descendents rights over Jammu in favour of Gulab Singh, Dhian Singh, and Suchet Singh. Jammu was no longer an independent polity and had been reduced to a provincial possession of the Sikhs. On 16 June 1822, Ranjit Singh personally installed Gulab Singh as the Raja of Jammu. Following this, Gulab Singh enacted a period of expansion of his regional power by consolidating his position and conquering adjacent territories and Pahari polities, such as Reasi, Rajouri, Jasrota, Ramnagar, Kishtwar, Chenani, Bhaderwah, and Basohli.

=== Under the Sikh Empire ===
During Sikh-rule, the Jammu Dogras played a pivotal role in the expansion of the Sikh Empire, especially in Ladakh, Gilgit, and Baltistan. The three most prominent Dogras during the Sikh period were the brothers Gulab Singh, Dhian Singh, and Suchet Singh. Dhian Singh, a nephew, rose to the role of prime minister (Dastur-e-Muazzam) of the Sikh Empire and Suchet Singh was bestowed with the raja title. Hira Singh, another Dogra, formed a close bond with the Sikh ruler, who gave him the Farzand-i-Khas title. After two failed Sikh attempts to conquer Kashmir (which was under Afghan governorship) in 1812 and 1813, another attempt in 1814 heavily involved Gulab Singh. Due to the poor advice provided by Raja Aghar Khan, the Sikh force was divided into two, one of which was directly commanded by Ranjit Singh, which marched to Poonch, and the other by Ram Dayal, which aimed for Beramgalla. Ram Dayal's force was almost completely lost in the conflict but Gulab Singh help them find their way to safety. However, Gulab's father Kishore was injured during the military action. As thanks, Ranjit Singh bestowed Gulab the jagir of Khotri Beyol. Due to intelligentsia provided by Birbhal Dhar (a minister in the Afghan governance of Kashmir, which was under Jabar Khan on behalf of Azim Khan, who had departed for a personal ambition in Peshawar), Kashmir was successfully conquered by the Sikhs in 1819 (with Gulab Singh taking part in the military action). Gulab Singh put down a revolt in Reasi in 1816–17 and also played a military role in the Sikh conquest of Multan in 1818. In 1820, Gulab Singh helped put down the rebellion of Mian Dido. Afterwards, he worked to bring the Pahari polities of Rajauri, Basohli, and Kishtwar to an end and firmly bring them into the Sikh sphere of influence. Due to Raja Tegh Mohammad Singh of Kishtwar refusing to handover Shah Shuja, who had taken refuge in Kishtwar for two years, to the Sikhs, Ranjit Singh ordered Gulab Singh to conquer Kishtwar in 1821, which was accompished via the assistance of Raja Dayal Chand of Chenani. Gulab Singh also assisted with the Sikh occupation of Peshawar in 1833-35. In 1831, Victor Jacquemont described Gulab Singh as "the greatest lord in Punjab" due to his influence and repute.

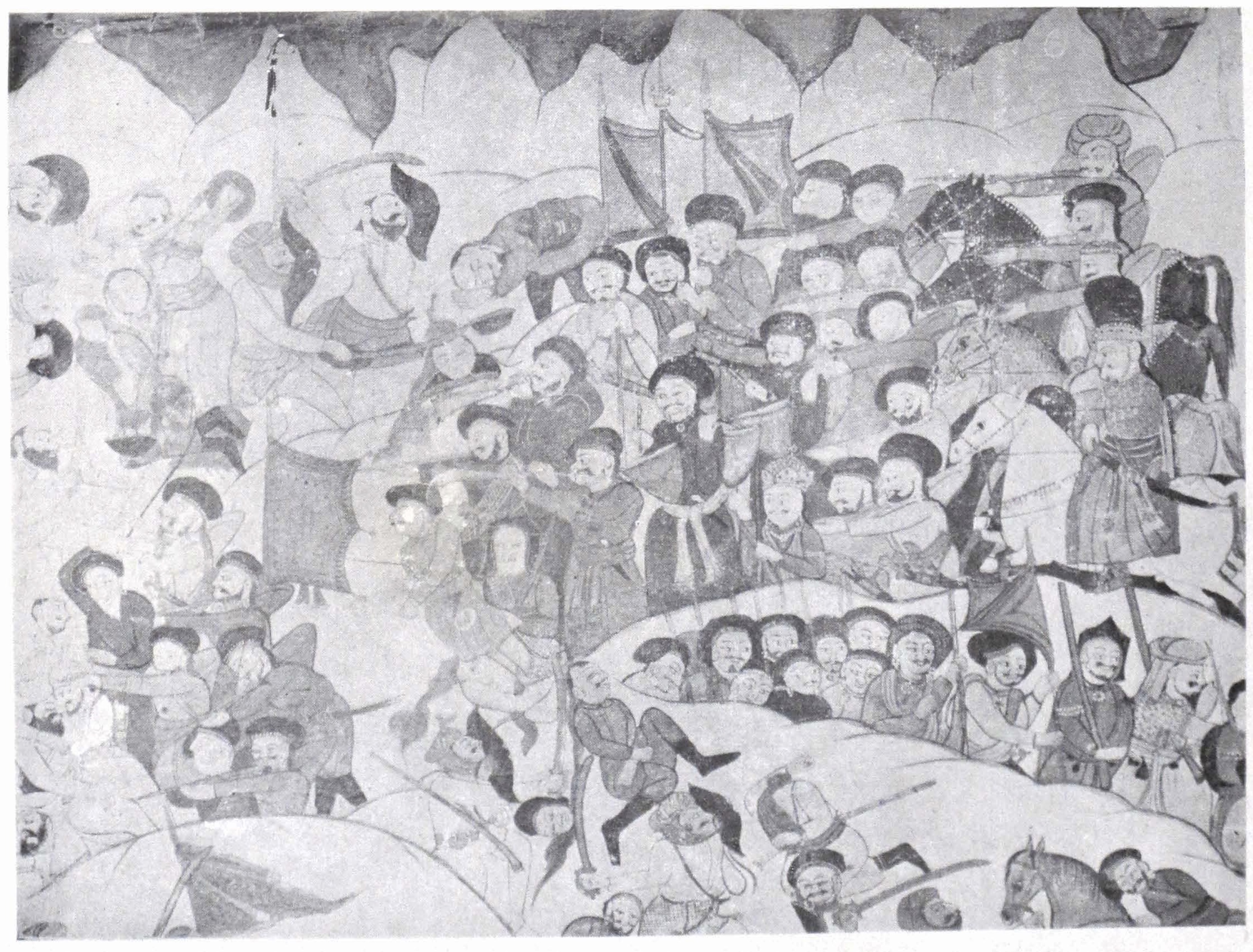
'A battle scene' (first), from a painted scroll documenting the joint Dogra-Sikh invasions of Ladakh, Baltistan, and Western Tibet, c. 1840s

Starting in 1834, the Dogras embarked on military expeditions under their general Zorawar Singh for taking Ladakh, whose conquest was pushed more by the Jammuite Dogras rather than the Lahore Darbar for economic and trade benefits. Thus, the Namgyal dynasty of Ladakh was annexed. Afterwards, the three states of Skardu, Gilgit, and Hunza were targeted. By 1840, Baltistan was conquered by Zorowar Singh. The Dogras in 1841 also attempted a failed invasion of Tibet.

=== Regained sovereignty ===
After the death of Ranjit Singh in 1839, the Sikh Empire fell into a period of disarray and instability. Gulab Singh's son Udham Singh was killed in the factionalist violence that ensued. In the aftermath of the First Anglo-Sikh War, Gulab Singh acted as the wazir of the empire and negotiated a peace with the British (Treaty of Lahore, 9 March 1846), with the Sikh Empire being faulted as the provokers and made to pay 15 million rupees as a war indemnity. A separate treaty (Treaty of Amritsar, 16 March 1846) signed between Gulab Singh and Lord Hardinge granted him the hilly or mountainous areas east of Indus and west of Ravi and recognized him as a maharaja of said land, agreeing to pay the British 7.5 million rupees. This led to the formation of the princely state of Jammu and Kashmir. This development was opposed by Lal Singh and Sheikh Imam-ud-Din. Gulab Singh's actions during the end of the Sikh Empire has been described as treacherous by some writers while others remark that he managed to preserve native rule in a substantial portion of the former Sikh Empire and that much of the former empire's territory was held due to past actions afford by Gulab Singh in previous military campaigns. The J&K State consisted of the Jammu, Kashmir and Frontier districts coalesed under a single polity and was the largest princely state in colonial India. Gulab Singh died on 30 June 1857.

== List of rulers of Jammu State ==
Ruler	Portrait	Reign	Reference
Raja Sangram Dev		1600 – 1625	
Raja Bhupat Dev		1625 – 1650	
Raja Hari Dev		1650 – 1690	
Raja Gajai Dev		1690 – 1703	
Raja Dhruv Dev		1703 – 1735	
Mian Ghansar Dev		1735 – 1747	
Raja Ranjit Dev		1747 – 1781	
Raja Braj Dev		1781 – 1787	
Raja Sampuran Dev		1787 – 1797	
Raja Jit Dev		1797 – 1808 or 1812	
Direct Sikh Rule		1808 or 1812 – 1820	
Raja Kishore Singh		1820 – 1822	
Raja Gulab Singh		1822 – 1846	

== Sources ==
- Siṅgha, Bhagata (1993). A History of the Sikh Misals. Punjab (India): Publication Bureau, Punjabi University.
- Gupta, Hari Ram (1999). History Of The Sikhs: The Sikh Commonwealth Or Rise And Fall Of Sikh Misls, Vol. Iv (3, illustrated ed.). Munshiram Manoharlal Publishers. ISBN 9788121501651.
- Singh, Dalbir (2010). Rise, Growth And Fall Of Bhangi Misal.
