= Ranjit Dev =

Ruler of Jammu from 1733 to 1782

- Sri; Sahib
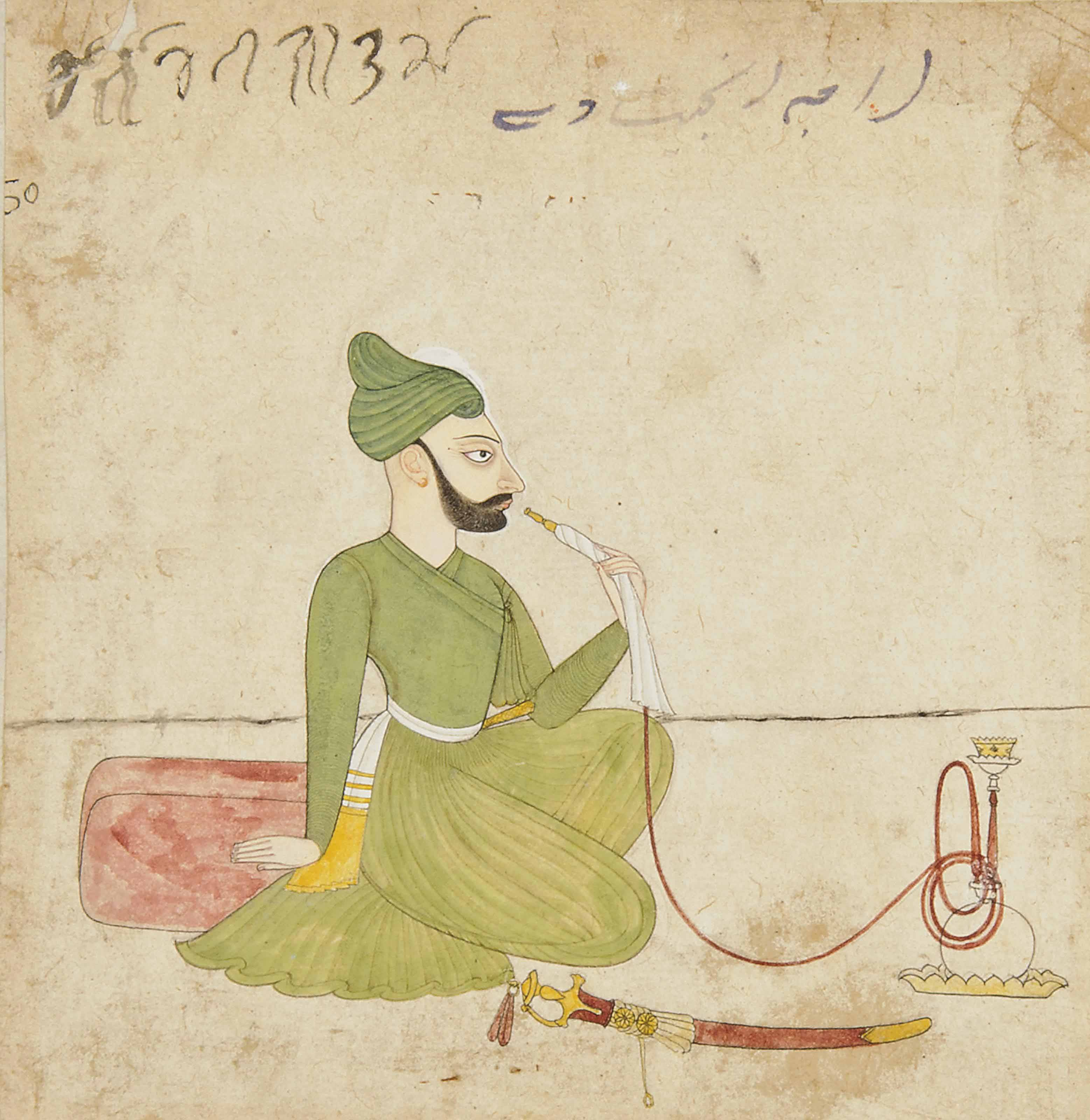
- Ranjit Dev smoking a hookah whilst leaning against a bolster while seated on a terrace, c. 1775–1780

Raja of Jammu
- Reign: 1747 – 4 April 1782
- Predecessor: Ghansar Dev
- Successor: Braj Dev
- Reign: 1733 – 1735
- Predecessor: Dhruv Dev
- Successor: Ghansar Dev
- Born: Ranjit Dev c. 1720 possibly Jammu, Jammu State, Mughal Empire (present-day Jammu and Kashmir, India)
- Died: 4 April 1782; Jammu, Jammu State, Bhangi Misl
- Issue: Braj Dev; Dalel Singh; Bua Bodhan
- House: Deva
- Father: Dhruv Dev
- Religion: Hinduism

Ranjit Dev (Dogri: रंजीत देव जी) was an 18th-century Dogra monarch who served as the Raja of the Deva state centred around the city of Jammu. He succeeded his father Dhruv Dev in 1733 and ruled (with an interregnum; 1735–1747) until his death in 1782. He was succeeded by Braj Dev, his son.

Ranjit Dev was an important ruler of the Jammu as his country was situated between Chenab and Ravi rivers. During his time Jammu was sacked by Sikhs of the Bhangi Misl and became its tributary. He acted as the Mughal Nazim (agent) over the Dogra Hills region. He is noted for his social reforms regarding women.

== Biography ==
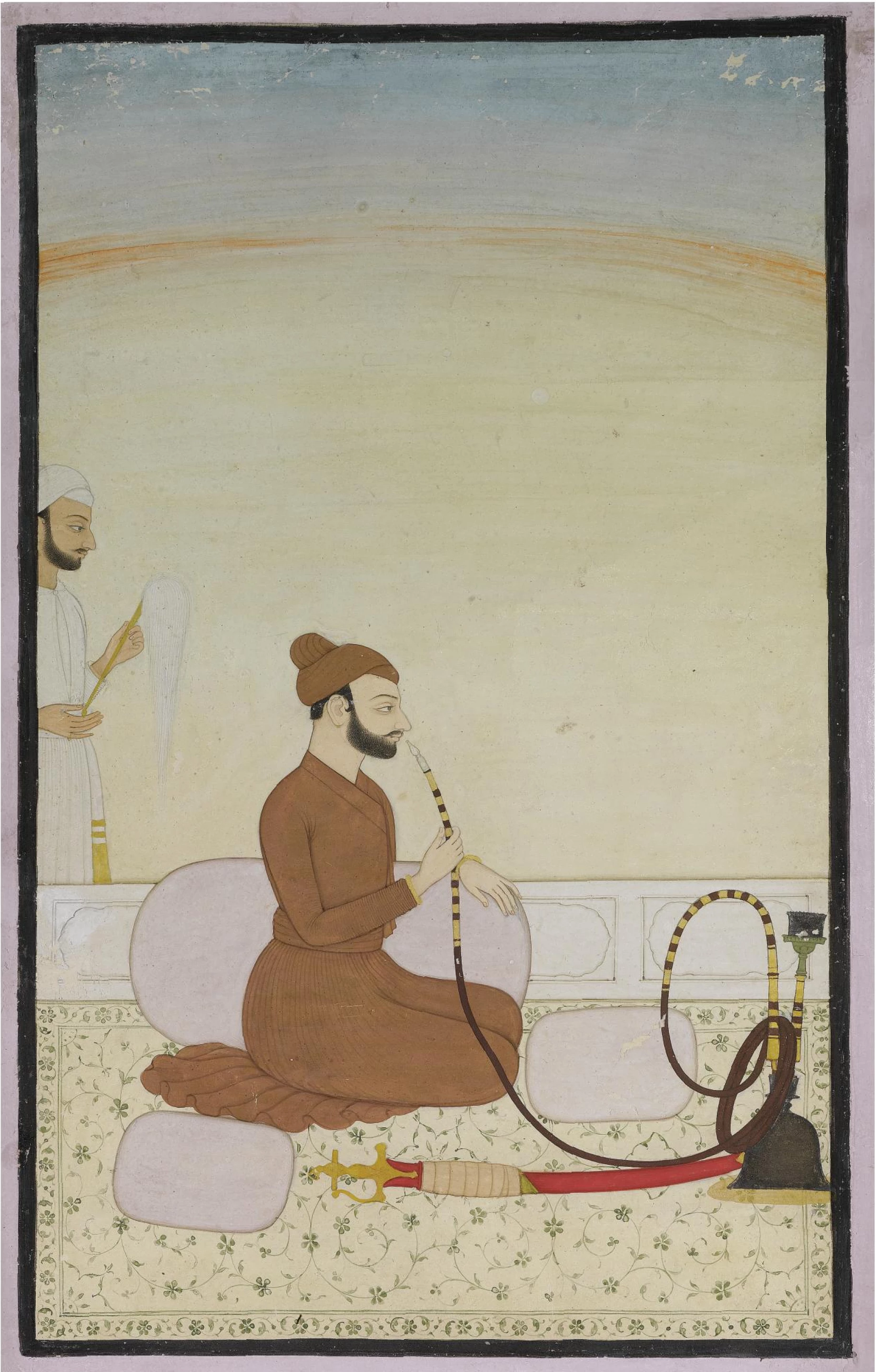
Painting of Raja Ranjit Dev of Jammu State smoking a hookah whilst leaning against a bolster while seated on a terrace, ca.1760–70

According to R. L. Mehta, Ranjit Dev ruled Jammu from 1750 to 1781. He ruled during a tumultuous period in northern Indian history, with the decline of the Mughal Empire, rise of the Sikhs, and Afghan invasions. The nearby Kashmir Valley came under the control of the Afghans. Despite this, Jammu remained comparatively stable and peaceful, with it being part of a trade route (such as of Kashmiri shawls) linking to Kashmir, Afghanistan, and Central Asia. Due to this, refugees and migrants from more unstable areas of India found refuge in Jammu. One of these migrants was Haji Karim Dad Khan of Kashmir and his company of thousands of mostly Muslims who crossed into Jammu via Banihal. Both Muslim (who came to settle in a quarter of Jammu that became known as Mughalpur) and Hindu immigrants were welcomed into the polity by Ranjit Dev, as per George Forster in 1783. A despatch sent to the Governor-General of the East India Company at the time stated:

The said Raja, Ranjit Dev, is distinguished for his courage and valour and is so just and kind to his ryots that the inhabitants of the Punjab and the Doab have since the time of Nadir Shah's invasion always found a safe refuge in this country from the tyranny of unscrupulous adventurers. The writer knows of no people from Attock to Delhi who live more free from care and fear than those of Jammu.

— Despatch to the Governor-General of the East India Company, Calcutta, 19 April 1780

During his reign, the dominance of Jammu extended over the twenty-two other hill polities from the Chenab and Ravi rivers, with its influence also reaching some states west of the Chenab, with his territory reaching the plains bordering northern Sialkot. A phrase arose expressing the hegemony of Jammu in the region: Bayis raj pahar de wich Jammu zardar ("of the 22 principalities of the mountain land, Jammu is the leader"). He operated his own mint, eventually striking coins in his own name with Bikrami dates rather than Mughal rulers, although retaining the accession year of Shah Alam.

Ghansar Dev, also known as Ghansar Chand, was the second son of Dhruv Dev and was born in ca.1715 (or perhaps earlier). He occupied the regency of Jammu State from 1735–1747, as Ranjit Dev had been arrested and imprisoned at Lahore between the years 1735–1747 due to the Mughals suspecting him of being disloyal to their governor of the hill region, therefore Ghansar served as regent in his elder brother's absence. In 1770, Jhanda Singh Bhangi threatened Ranjit Dev with an army but Ranjit Dev secured peace via a tribute paid to the Bhangis. During his time Battle of Jammu (1774) was fought in which Raja Braj Dev secured victory. During the battle, both sides sought help from forces of the Sikh Confederacy. In 1779, Ranjit Dev invaded Kashmir (which was under the Afghan governorship of Haji Karim Dad) with 20,000 troops after being promised support for this action by the Kanth family and the Khakha and Bamba tribal chiefs of the Baramulla Valley, while the Kashmiri governor was occupied with conflict with Skardu. However, the Afghan governor of Kashmir repelled the Jammuite attack and Ranjit Dev's forces retreated.

=== Social reforms ===
Ranjit Dev desired to rid of misogynistic practices prevalent amongst the Rajputs, such as female infanticide and sati, which were seen as sources of pride. However, instead of attempting to outlaw such practices overtly, he instead attempted to subvert ingrained discriminatory beliefs and practices through his actions. Ranjit Dev expressed the desire for a daughter (declaring the birth of a daughter in a family to be auspicious), carried out thousands of rituals, including morning and afternoon prayers via fakirs, believed to assure the birth of a daughter in his household, and celebrated the birth of a daughter when it occurred, having a closer relationship to his daughter than his two sons. He stated on his deathbed that no woman should burn herself on his funeral pyre when he died. His reforms led to a decline of female infanticide and greater rates daughter-raising amongst the Jamwal clan.

== Family and succession ==
Ranjit Dev had two sons, named Brijraj Dev and Dalel Singh respectively, and a daughter named Bua Bodhan. His daughter was married to the Raja of Nurpur. Ranjit Dev preferred his younger son Dalel Singh to succeed him instead of the elder son Brijraj Dev. However, Brijraj Dev secured Sikh assistance via Charat Singh Sukerchakia and Jai Singh Kanhaiya to assure his accession to the Jammuite throne. A coalition of the forces of Ranjit Dev, Jhanda Singh Bhangi, and the armies from Chamba, Nurpur, and Basohli failed to prevent Brijraj Dev's usurpation of the Jammuite throne. Ranjit Dev died in 1781 and his successor later became completely subjugated by the Sikhs as a tributary, with Jammu losing its former independence.

== Sources ==
- Gupta, Hari Ram (1999). History Of The Sikhs: The Sikh Commonwealth Or Rise And Fall Of Sikh Misls, Vol. IV (3rd, illustrated ed.). Munshiram Manoharlal Publishers. ISBN 9788121501651.
- Singh, Dalbir (2010). Rise, Growth And Fall Of Bhangi Misal.
- Siṅgha, Bhagata (1993). A History of the Sikh Misals. Punjab (India): Publication Bureau, Punjabi University.
