= Battle of Jammu (1774) =

Sikh Interwarfare

- Part of Sikh Interwarfare
Date	1774
Location	Jammu, India
Result	Braj Dev-Kanhaiya-Sukerchakia victory
Territorial changes	Jammu becomes tributary of Kanhaiya Misl

Belligerents
Braj Dev Faction; Kanhaiya Misl; Sukerchakia Misl	Ranjit Dev faction Bhangi Misl; Chamba; Kangra

Commanders and leaders
Braj Dev; Jai Singh Kanhaiya; Charat Singh †	Raja Ranjit Dev; Jhanda Singh Bhangi X Ganda Singh Bhangi

The Battle of Jammu was fought in 1774 between Raja Ranjit Deo of Jammu, supported by Jhanda Singh Bhangi of the Bhangi Misl, and Brij Raj Deo, who was allied with Charat Singh Sukerchakia of the Sukerchakia Misl and Jai Singh Kanhaiya of the Kanhaiya Misl. The conflict arose from a succession dispute within the Dev dynasty of Jammu between Ranjit Deo and his eldest son, Brij Raj Deo. It took place in the Jammu region, part of the northern territories of the Indian subcontinent.

== Background ==
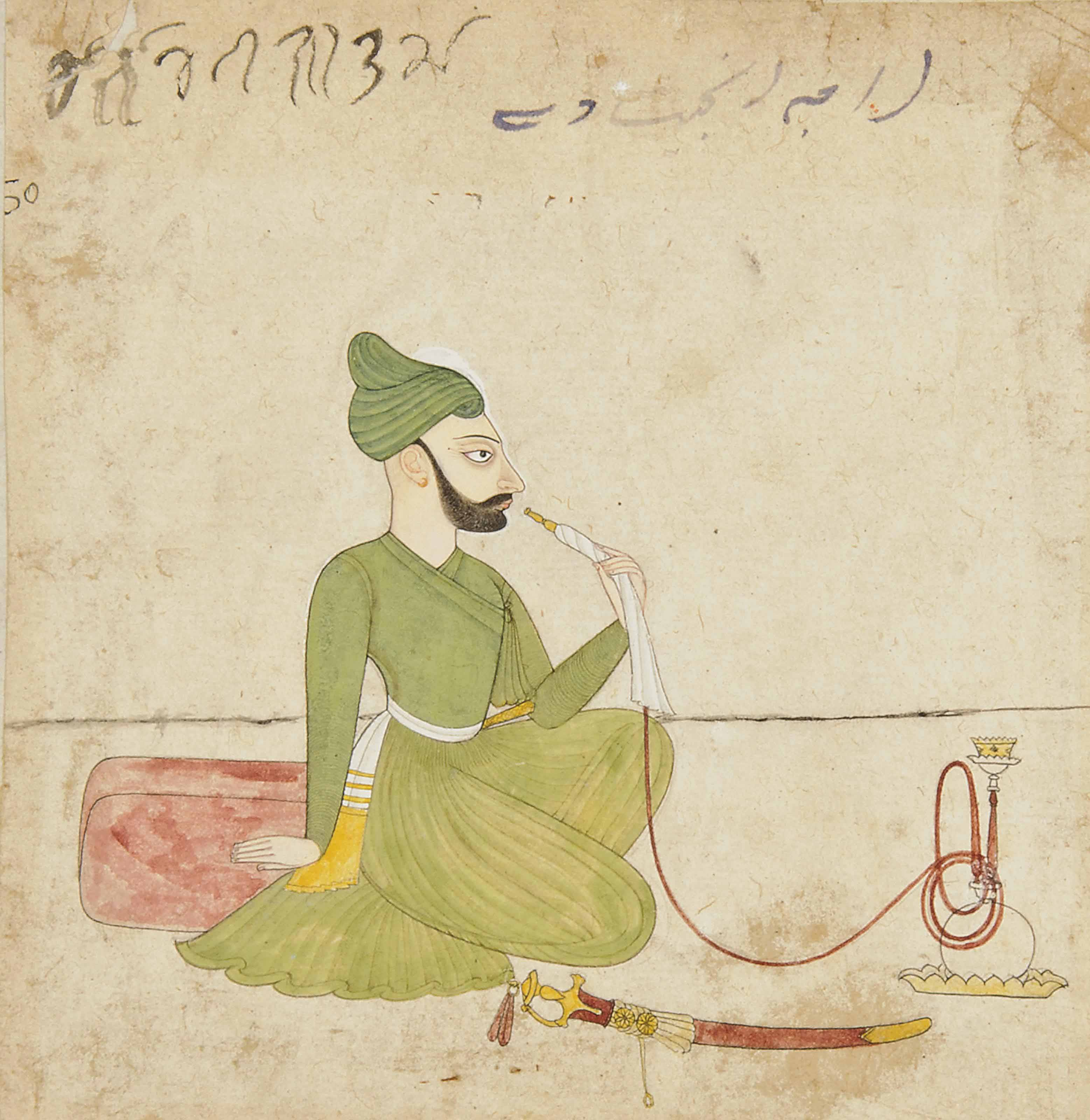
Raja Ranjit Dev of Jammu

In the year 1774, a succession dispute arose between Raja Ranjit Deo of Jammu, vassal of Jhanda Singh Bhangi and his eldest son, Brij Raj Deo. Frustrated by his father for declaring the younger son Dalel Singh as his successor, Brij Raj Deo began a rebellion for enforcing his rights. The claimant, Brij Raj Dev, on his part, sought aid from Charat Singh Sukerchakia and Jai Singh Kanhaiya to support his claim.

Ranjit Deo, being too weak to resist the united forces of Charat Singh Sukerchakia and Jai Singh Kanhaiya separately, appealed for military aid from his suzerain, Jhanda Singh Bhangi. Anticipating the arrival of such reinforcements, the forces of Jai Singh Kanahiya and Charat Singh Sukerchakia advanced and encamped on the bank of the Basantar River, close to the boundary of the Jammu territory with the Sialkot District.

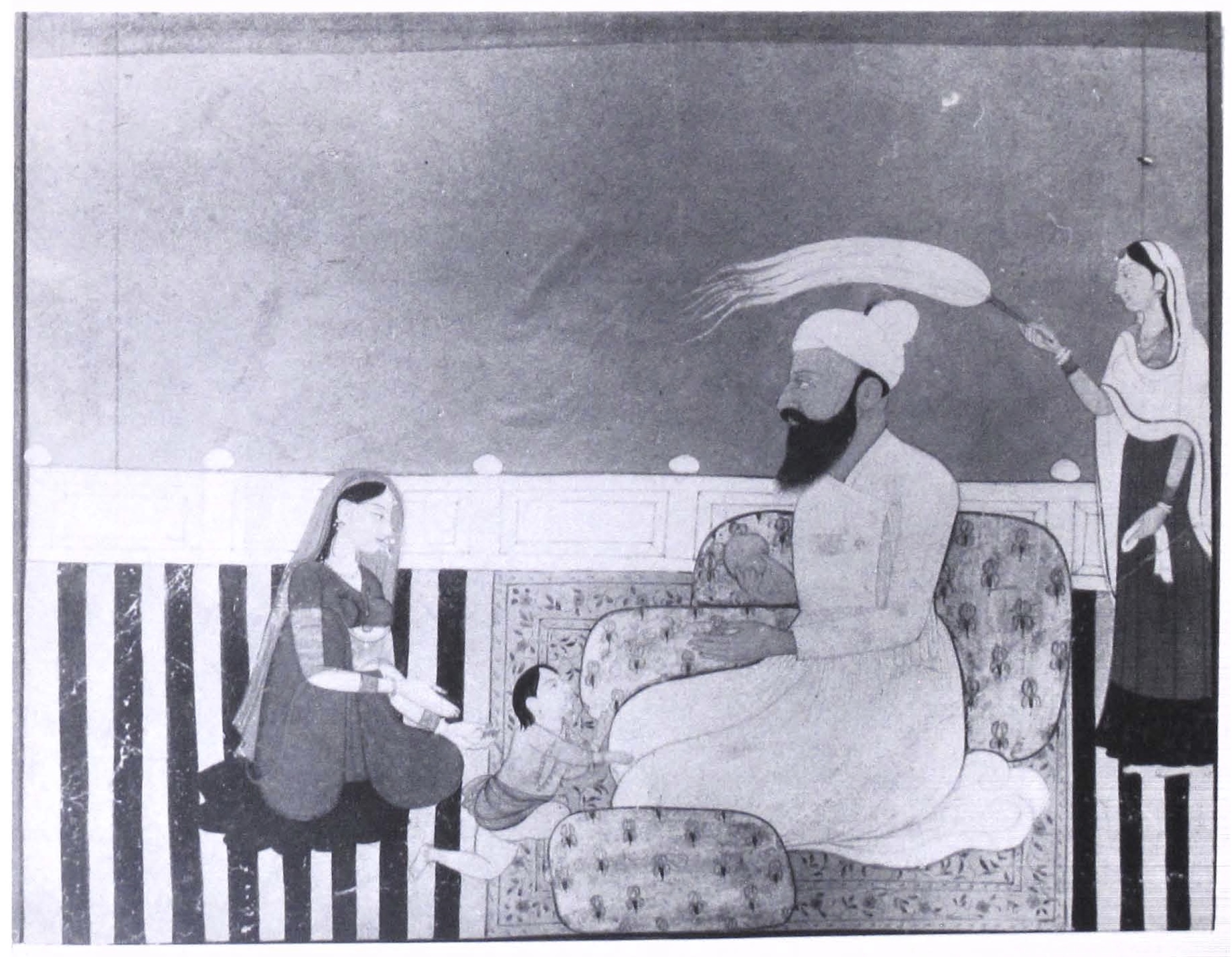
Raja Braj Dev of Jammu

Ranjit Deo, meanwhile, got his army organized with the help of staunchly allied chiefs from Chamba, Kangra, Nurpur and Basoli, in alliance with the troops provided by Jhanda Singh Bhangi to challenge the combine.

== Battle ==
The skirmishes between the two opposing forces developed into a full-scale battle at Dasuha, near the town of Zafarwal. The battle continued for 23 days without either side gaining a conclusive advantage. On the twenty-third day, Charat Singh Sukerchakia was killed accidentally when his own gun backfired, causing the fatal injury to his forehead.

The death of Charat Singh was a great loss for the allies, and therefore, their strength to resist the strong forces of Jhanda Singh Bhangi was weakened. Jai Singh Kanhaiya, knowing that the son of Charat Singh, Maha Singh, was too young to challenge Jhanda Singh therefore decided that their safety lay in the death of the Bhangi Sardar. To ward off the threat from Jhanda Singh, Jai Singh is said to have plotted a conspiracy to have him killed. A Mazhabi Sikh in the service of Jhanda Singh was bribed, it is said, to do the deed, and Jhanda Singh was shot dead from behind while walking alone in his camp.

== Aftermath ==
Following the death of Jhanda Singh, his younger brother, Ganda Singh, who was present in the camp, was deeply affected. Demoralized by the loss, Ganda Singh chose to withdraw from Jammu, bringing the conflict to an end. By realizing the growing power of Jai Singh Kanhaiya, Raja Ranjit Deo made an agreement with his son Brij Raj Deo and allowed paying an annual tribute amount of 125,000 rupees. Jai Singh Kanahiya, satisfied with the settlement, set out to consolidate the power of the Kanhaiya Misl.

Before quitting Jammu, the young Maha Singh made a gesture of diplomacy by exchanging turbans with Brij Raj Deo. The ceremony was considered a token of lifelong brotherhood, an act that Mahan Singh later exploited to further his own strategic purposes.
