= Raja Braj Dev =

Raja of Jammu from 1782 to 1787

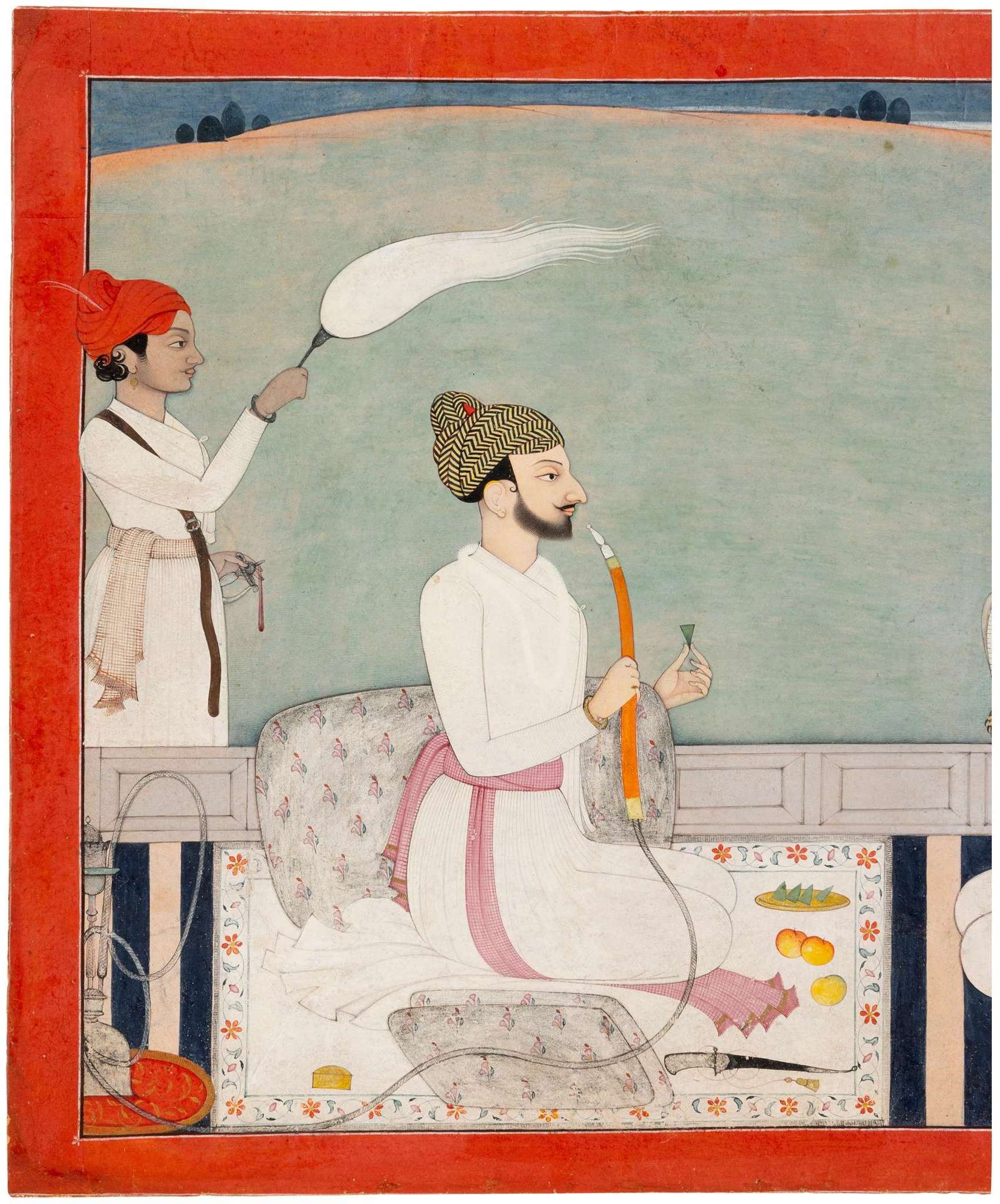
Detail of a Pahari painting of a seated raja with two courtiers before him presenting a white hawk, possibly depicting Raja Brij Raj Dev of Jammu State, likely by the Nainsukh atelier, Punjab Hills, Jammu, ca.1760–80

Raja Braj Raj Dev was a ruler of the Deva dynasty of Jammu, Jamwal Dogras, who ruled from 1782 to 1787. (Note: His name is alternatively rendered as 'Raja Brij Raj Dev' and he is also known as 'Raja Brij Lal Dev'.) He was a ruler, but failed to stop Sikh invasions in Jammu. In 1785, the Sikhs occupied Basholi, Jasrota, and Ramnagar. The Battle of Jammu (1774) was fought between him and Ranjit Dev.

== Rise to power ==
Braj Dev was the son of Raja Ranjit Dev of Jammu, he had a younger brother named Dalel Singh and a sister named Bua Bodhan (who married the Raja of Nurpur). Raja Ranjit Dev did not believe Raj Dev to be fit to succeed him and instead supported his younger son Dalel Singh to succeed him as the next Jammuite ruler. Enraged, Braj Dev decided to fight for the throne, making allies with Charat Singh Sukerchakia and Jai Singh Kanhaiya. Meanwhile, Raja Ranjit Dev was allied with the Jhanda Singh Bhangi of the Bhangi Misl and the fellow Pahari polities of Chamba, Nurpur, and Basohli. The faction of Braj Dev prevailed and he was installed as the next ruler of Jammu. Braj Dev tried to maintain Jammu's independence from the ascendant Sikhs but ended up becoming a tributary state, paying an annual tribute of 30,000 rupees.

== Death ==
In 1787, Raja Braj Dev tried to recover his territories from the Sikhs, but he was killed in the Battle of Rumal, with the combined forces of Sikhs sardars of the Sukerchakia Misl and Bhangi Misl. He was succeeded by Raja Sampuran Singh, who surrendered to the Sikhs.

== Sources ==
- Gupta, Hari Ram (1999). History Of The Sikhs: The Sikh Commonwealth Or Rise And Fall Of Sikh Misls, Vol. IV (3rd, illustrated ed.). Munshiram Manoharlal Publishers. ISBN 9788121501651.
- Singh, Dalbir (2010). Rise, Growth And Fall Of Bhangi Misal.
- Siṅgha, Bhagata (1993). A History of the Sikh Misals. Punjab (India): Publication Bureau, Punjabi University.
