= Mian Dido Jamwal =

Dogra Rajput warrior (1780–1821)

- Born: 1780; Jagti village, Jammu State
- Died: 1821 (aged 40–41); Trikuta hill, Jammu, Sikh Empire
- Known for: Leading a rebellion of the common people in Jammu against the Sikh Empire
- Children: Mian Basant Singh; Mian Gulshan Singh
- Father: Mian Hazara
- Relatives: Dogra dynasty

Mian Dido Jamwal (1780-1821) was a Dogra Rajput warrior from the Jamwal clan who rebelled against the overlords of Jammu during the Sikh Empire of Maharaja Ranjit Singh. He was descended from Raja Hari Dev of Jammu. Mian Dido was extremely popular among the common people of Jammu, and even today he is the subject of several ballads and legends. He is considered a hero and propagator of the regional identity of Jammu in political terms. He was killed by the troops of Gulab Singh after being surrounded.

== Early life ==
According to oral tradition, Mian Dido was born in 1780, to Mian Hazara Singh (jagirdar of Jagti village) in Jagti village, Jammu. He was the descendant of Raja Hari Dev of Jammu after six generations, Raja Hari Dev was the common ancestor of both Mian Dido and Gulab Singh, the founder of the Dogra dynasty and the first ruler of Jammu and Kashmir princely state. Mian Hazara Singh started to train his son as a swordsman and archer right from his childhood.

== Rebellion ==
In 1808, the Dogra rulers of Jammu were defeated in the Battle of Jammu against the Sikhs and Jammu came under the rule of Ranjit Singh, ruler of the Sikh Empire. Mian Dido was disturbed as he thought of the Sikh conquest as an insult to the dignity and prestige of the natives. Hence, he decided to organize the common people in a rebellion against Sikh authority. Contemporary Sikh documentarians described how Mian Dido and his rebels shattered the integrity of Sikh rule in Jammu by relentlessly marauding Sikh-majority towns and villages, refusing to pay taxes, robbing Sikh merchants and traders, murdering the Sikhs' government servants and persuading most Zamindars of that era and region into paying nothing in dues to Sikhs.

Many ballads were composed in praise of his valour and resistance, one of which is shown below:

Beria daiya chodi de, sadi kandi chodi de
Apne Manje da mulk samhal, apne Lahaure da mulk samhal
Pagdi talwar Mian Dido hall je kitta
Badi Badi mundian beri diyan range garne naal
Ladkan bal garne naal, hath audan nahi Dido Jamwal

== Death ==
When all else failed, Ranjit Singh decided that an indigenous Dogra commander would be able to suppress the rebellion since he would be able to communicate with the natives, be aware of the culture and would know the terrain thoroughly. Hence, he sent Gulab Singh, a Dogra courtier at Lahore to crush the resistance of Mian Dido. Initially, Gulab Sin.h tried to convince Mian Dido to submit, he would be spared and given a high post in the Sikh court if he stopped the rebellion. However, the latter refused and then Gulab Singh tried to use his kinmanship with him (Raja Hari Dev of Jammu was their common ancestor) as a pretext to not fight. When negotiations failed, Gulab Singh cut off the food supplies of Mian Dido's men. The latter still refused to surrender, and Gulab Singh sent his troops under Attar Singh Kallol to surround the village of Jagti, the ancestral jagir of Mian Dido. Dido was not present there, however his father Mian Hazara Singh defended the village and was killed. Mian Dido fled to the Trikuta hills with his family. When they were surrounded by Sikh forces, Dido left his wife and two sons under the protection of a priest of the Vaishno Devi temple. At this juncture, legend says that he slew Attar Singh Kallol a sikh commander along with his sikh soldiers, who had killed his father, and with great composure, sat on a rock and started smoking his hookah. He was killed by a bullet from one of the troops of Sikh army

== See also ==
- Gulab Singh
- Jammu
- Sikh Empire
