= Jamwal =

Rajput clan from Jammu, India

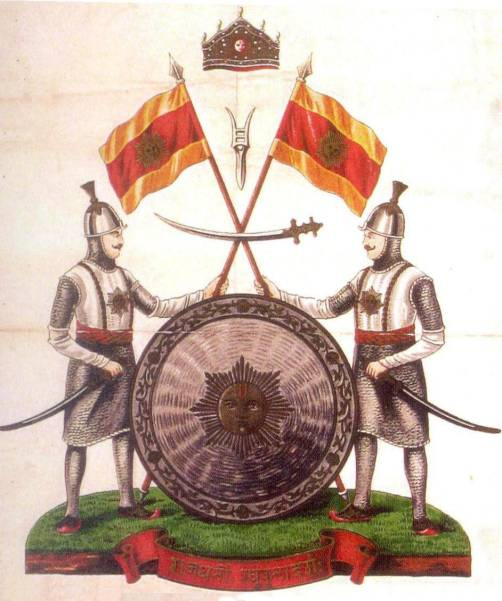
Seal of Hari Singh on the cover of the Civil List

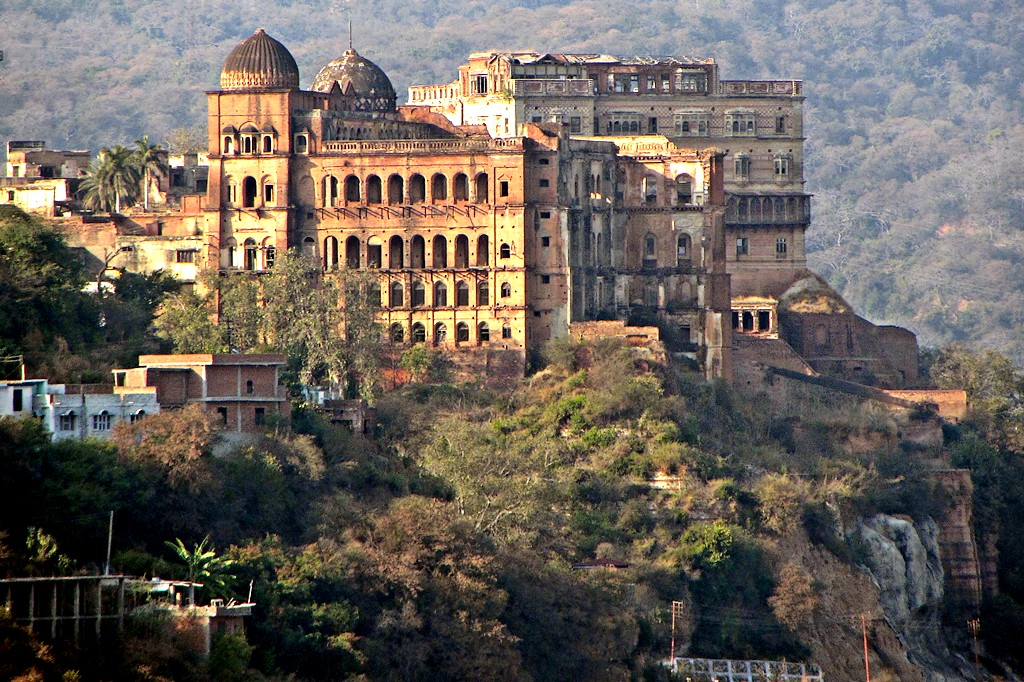
Mubarak Mandi Palace – The Royal House of Jamwal clan

Jamwal is a toponymic surname for a Dogra Rajput clan of the same name from Jammu, in Jammu and Kashmir, India. They claim descent from the traditional founder of Jammu, Jambu Lochan, and there at one time some of their members were rulers of the princely state of Jammu and Kashmir, often referred to as the Dogra dynasty.

== Notable people ==
- Maharaja Gulab Singh Jamwal
- Maharaja Hari Singh
- Maharaja Pratap Singh of Jammu and Kashmir
- Maharaja Ranbir Singh
- Yuvraj Karan Singh
- Yuvraj Vikramaditya Singh
- Brigadier Rajinder Singh
- Mian Dido Jamwal, Dogra warrior who fought against Sikh Empire.
- Ayush Jamwal, Indian cricketer
- Narsingh Dev Jamwal, Indian writer
- Pratibha Jamwal, Indian Navy officer
- Ranveer Jamwal, Indian Army officer and mountain climber
- Satyendra Singh Jamwal, Indian Navy officer
- Vidyut Jamwal, Indian actor
- Rohit Singh Jamwal, Cricketer

== See also ==
- Dogras
- Dogri language
