= George Forster (traveller) =

English traveller and civil servant

George Forster (c. 1750 – February 1791) was an English traveller and civil servant of the East India Company, on the Madras establishment. He has sometimes been confused with the German naturalist Georg Forster. He is notable for being the first Briton to have journeyed from India through Central Asia to Russia and published a journal of his travels.

== Life ==
In 1782 Forster undertook a journey that began in Calcutta, Bengal and passed through Kashmir, Afghanistan, Herat, Khorasan, and Mazandaran, crossed the Caspian Sea by ship, and then travelled to Baku, Astrakhan, Moscow, St Petersburg and then by ship to London.

In 1791 he was sent on an embassy to the Mahrattas, and died at Nagpore (called Nagpur in modern times).

== Works ==
He published in England Sketches of the Mythology and Customs of the Hindoos (84 pp., 1785); and on his return to India he wrote an account of his journey, the first volume of which was published at Calcutta in 1790. The narrative of his journey was completed from his papers, and published in London by an unknown editor as A Journey from Bengal to England through the Northern part of India, Kashmire, Afghanistan, and Persia, and into Russia by the Caspian Sea (2 vols. 1798). He also published in 1803 a work co-authored with Antoine Polier on the Sikhs, one of the earliest English language accounts on the group.
