= Raja Dhruv Dev =

Ruler of Jammu from 1707 to 1733

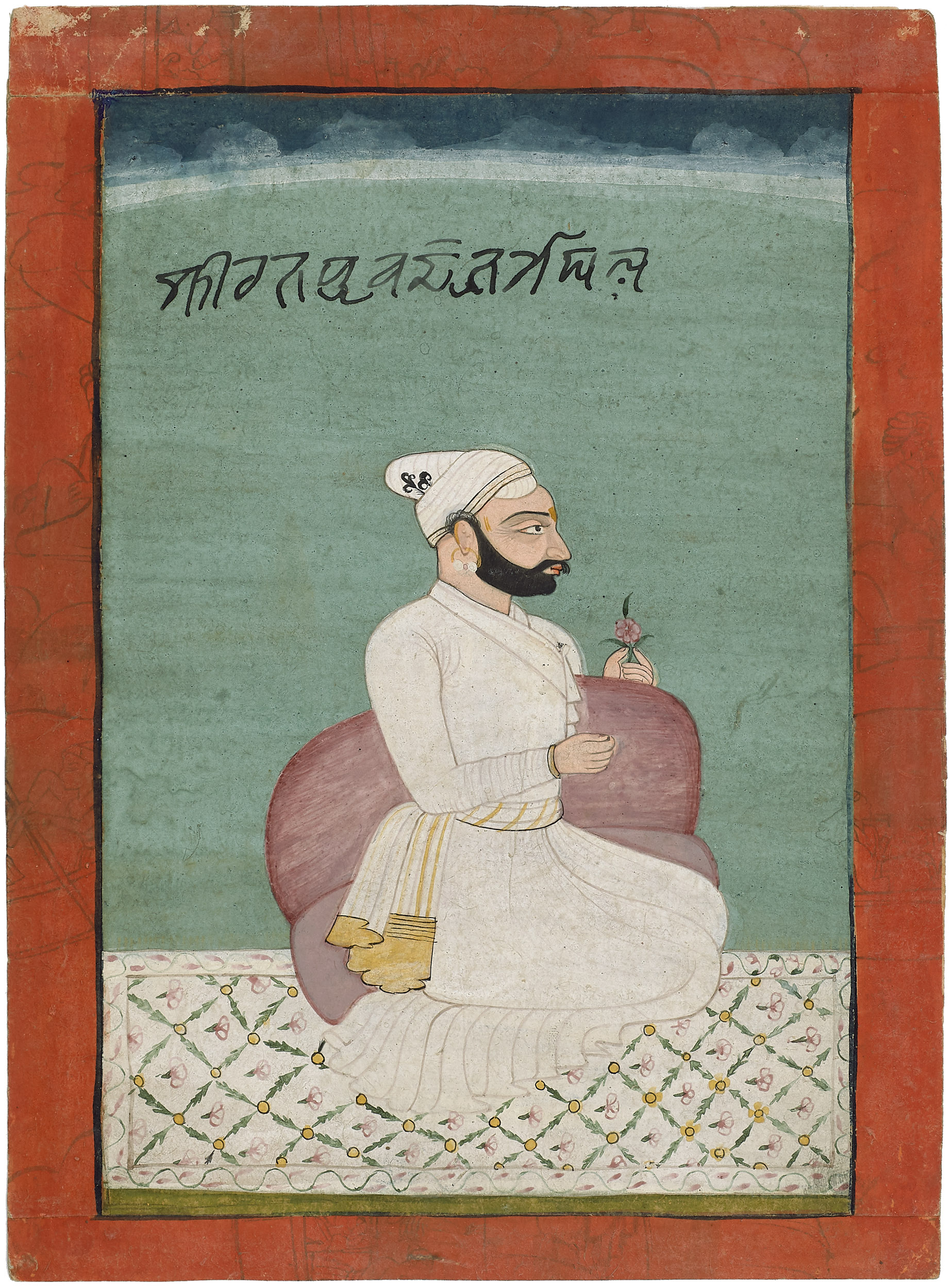
- Painting of Raja Dhruv Dev of Jammu State seated leaning against a bolster and holding a flower, by Uttam, Jammu, c. 1760

Raja of Jammu
- Reign: c. 1707 – c. 1733
- Predecessor: Gujai Dev
- Successor: Ranjit Dev
- Died: c. 1733
- Issue Detail: Ranjit Dev; Ghunsar Dev; Surat Singh; Balwant Dev

Raja Dhruv Dev was the ruler of the Deva dynasty of Jammu who ruled from c. 1707 to c. 1733.

According to the Rajdarshani, a historical chronicle by 19th-century historian Ganeshdas Badenra, the Mubarak Mandi Palace was founded when Raja Dhruv Dev in 1710, after consulting his astrologers, moved his residence from the older palace in Purani Mandi to a new, grander location overlooking the Tawi River. During his tenure, the Battle of Jammu (1712) was fought in which he sided with the Mughals to defeat Sikh rebel Banda Singh Bahadur.

== Chronology ==
The dating for the beginning and end of Raja Dhruv Dev's reign is disputed. The start of his rule is noted as being either 1703 or 1707, and the end date for his rule is alternatively recorded as either 1724, 1725, 1727, 1729, 1730, 1733, 1735, or 1742.

Diwan Kirpa Ram states that Dhruv Dev's reign began in Bikrami 1780 (c. 1703 A.D.) and ended twenty-two years later, corresponding to the year 1725. The 1730 date for the end of his reign is attested to by Shahamat Ali, who in 1839 was the Persian secretary under C.M. Wade's mission to Peshawar. Other historians who supported differing dates include Hutchison and Vogel, who together marked 1735 as being the last year of Dhruv Dev's rule, and G.C. Smyth, who instead marked 1742. The Rajdarshani provides multiple contradicting dates. It states that Dhruv Dev's reign lasted from the accession of Mughal Emperor Bahadur Shah until the ninth year of Emperor Muhammad Shah's reign, which are the years 1707 A.D. and 1727 A.D. respectively. The Rajdharshani also reports that Dhruv Dev's reign lasted twenty-two years after starting, as previously mentioned by the Rajdarshani, in 1707. Adding twenty-two years on top of 1707 gives the year 1729, which conflicts with the Rajdarshani's previously provided date of 1727. The Rajdarshani also states, however, that Dhruv Dev died on 4 Katik, 1781 Bikrami or 1140 Hijri. These dates correspond to 16 October 1724 A.D. and 1727 A.D. respectively. The Rajdarshani also states that the ascension of Raja Ranjit Dev to the throne of Jammu occurred on 29 April 1724 A.D., marking a third contradictory date provided by the text.

Sukh Dev Singh Charak writes that a "Patta" from Emperor Muhammad Shah written in 1732 A.D. confirms the rule of Raja Dhruv Dev on the condition of the payment of nazrana, a ceremonial gift to one's liege, by himself, Ranjit Dev, and Ghunsar Dev to the Mughal Emperor. Charak states that this provides evidence of two things: that Dhruv Dev was still reigning by 1732, and that his two eldest sons, Ranjit Dev and Ghunsar Dev, were old enough to have been considered associate rulers of Jammu alongside their father. This would make earlier dates for the end of Dhruv Dev's rule, including 1724, 1725, 1727, and 1730, implausible. Charak himself supports 1733 A.D. as being the most plausible date for the end of Dhruv Dev's reign, which he arrives at by subtracting twelve years from the final year of Ranjit Dev's imprisonment in Lahore, which he states was the year 1745, and likely in the month of April.

== Reign ==
=== Conflicts with the Bahuwals ===
The Rajas of Jammu and Bahu, who composed different branches of the same family, and who each claimed to be the senior line of the Dev dynasty, had been engaged in intermittent warfare against one another for generations by the time of the accession of Raja Dhruv Dev to the throne of Jammu. This conflict had been ended for a time by Raja Hari Dev's subjugation of Bahu. The Bahuwals were allowed to retain the title of Raja even after this however, which historian Sukh Dev Singh Charak takes as suggesting that Hari Dev's subjugation of Bahu may have been diplomatic in nature. The Bahuwal-Jamwal conflict once again reignited however after Raja Anand Dev of the Bahuwals took the aid of Mughal officers stationed in Punjab to reestablish independent Bahuwal rule. The conflict with Bahu remained a persistent issue for Dhruv Dev throughout his reign. Jamwal forces launched multiple raids on Bahuwal territory throughout Dhruv Dev's reign, each time causing destruction and stealing cattle. During Dhruv Dev's reign, the Bahuwals in exchange launched at least seven raids of their own against Jammu, each time razing Jamwal buildings. During some of these raids even the residence of the Raja of Jammu himself was razed, forcing Dhruv Dev to begin living in temporary residences. These raids were of an internecine nature, and afterwards left Jammu's population greatly reduced for generations. Dhruv Dev ended the Jammu-Bahu conflict by collaborating with Qamar-ud-Din Khan to occupy Bahu, subjugating the Bahuwal royal family and forcing them to live in Jammu, resulting in the end of Raja Anand Dev's rule in Bahu in c. 1715. This would not mark the definitive end of the Jamwal-Bahuwal conflict however, as after Dhruv Dev's death and the accession of his son Ranjit Dev, Ugar Dev, a descendant of Raja Anand Dev, would press his claims to the throne of Bahu and convinced the Mughal Viceroy of Lahore, who already had suspicions of Ranjit Dev, that Ranjit Dev ought to be dealt with, leading to the series of events that resulted in Ranjit Dev's twelve-year imprisonment in Lahore.

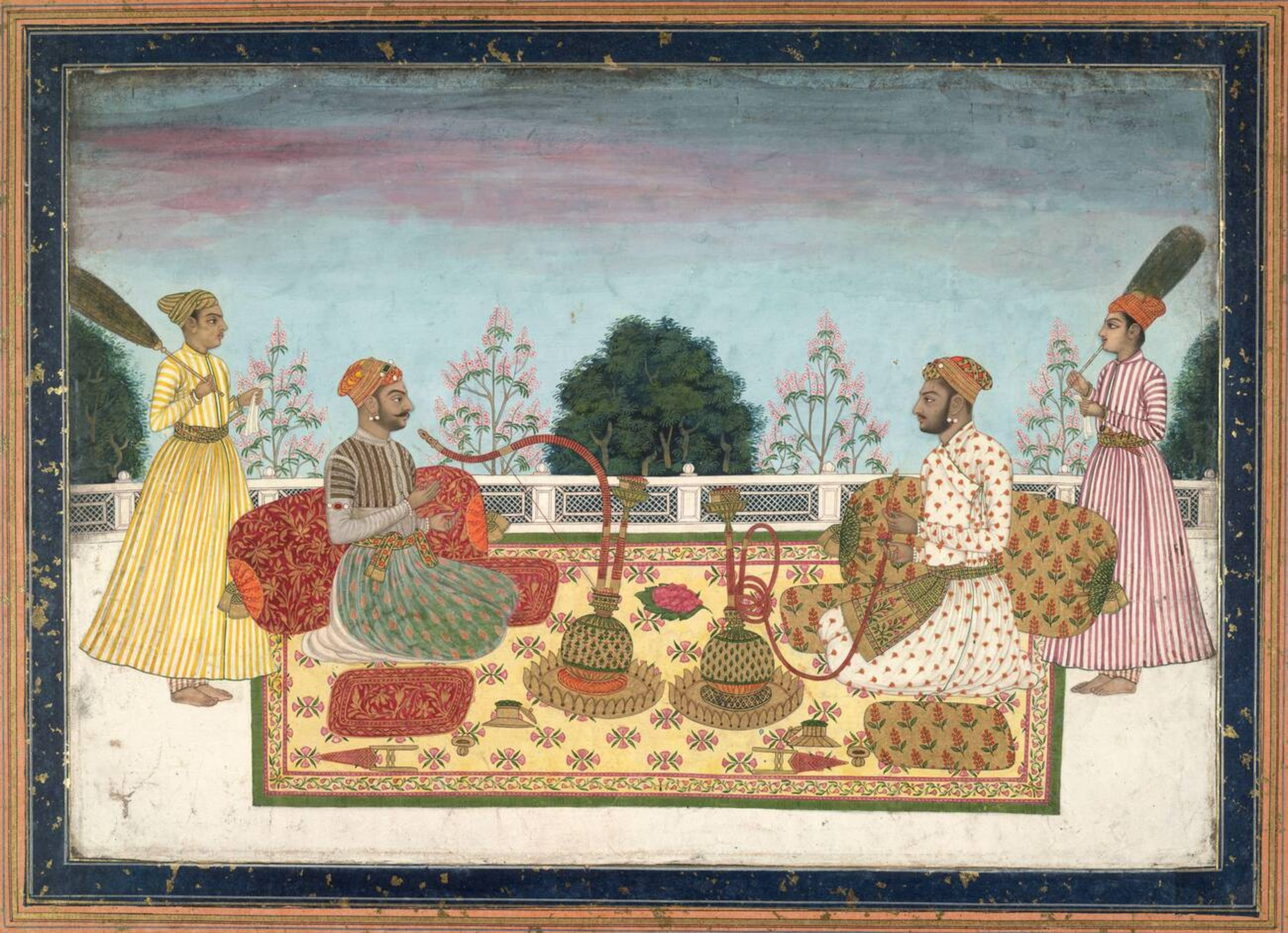
Painting of Raja Anand Dev of Bahu (right) and Raja Dhruv Dev of Jammu (left), by Patak Chand, Faizabad, c. 1770.

=== Relations with the Chamba State ===
Dhruv Dev had close relations with Raja Ugar Singh of Chamba. The traditional accounts of Chamba's history record that after the restoration of Udai Singh to the throne of Chamba, Ugar Singh fled to Jammu and anonymously served in the armies of Dhruv Dev as a soldier. When Dhruv Dev found out about this some time later, he rendered aid to help install Ugar Singh to the throne of Chamba after the death of Udai Singh.

Good relations between Jammu and Chamba continued thereafter, with multiple royal marriages between the two states taking place. Ranjit Dev, much the same as his father did with Ugar Singh, rendered aid to Raja Raj Singh of Chamba when Ghamand Chand of Kangra invaded his territories.

== Family and children ==
=== Children ===
Raja Dhruv Dev is recorded to have four sons, whose names are known, and at least one unnamed daughter. Likewise, the order of the birth of Dhruv Dev's sons is known, but the order of his daughter's birth is not.

1. Raja Ranjit Dev may have been born sometime c. 1720, died on 4 April 1782. Raja of Jammu.
2. Mian Ghunsar Dev was born after Ranjit Dev. Regent of Jammu during Raja Ranjit Dev's captivity in Lahore from 1735 to 1747.
3. Mian Surat Singh was born after Ghunsar Dev. Grandfather of Kishore Singh, who was Raja of Jammu from 1820 to 1822.
4. Mian Balwant Singh was born after Surat Singh.
5. The daughter of Dhruv Dev married Umed Singh, Raja of Chamba.

=== Descendants ===
Dogra Family Tree

Dhruv Dev; Raja of Jammu (r. 1703 – c. 1733)
Ranjit Dev; Raja of Jammu (r. 1733–1782)	Ghunsar Dev; Regent of Jammu (r. 1735–1747)	Surat Singh	Balwant Dev
Brij Raj Dev; Raja of Jammu (r. 1782–1787)	Dulel Singh	Mian Mota	Zorawar Singh	Dulla Bhoola
Sampuran Dev; Raja of Jammu (r. 1787–1797)	Jeet Singh; Raja of Jammu (r. 1797 – c. 1808)	Kishore Singh; Raja of Jammu (r. 1820–1822)
Gulab Singh; Raja of Jammu (r. 1822–1846); Maharaja of Jammu and Kashmir (r. 1846–1856); Wazir of the Sikh Empire (1846)	Dhian Singh; Wazir of the Sikh Empire (1818–1843); Raja of Bhimber, Chibhal, and Poonch (r. 1827–1843)	Suchet Singh; Raja of Ramnagar (r. 1822–1844)
Udham Singh	Sohan Singh	Ranbir Singh; Maharaja of Jammu and Kashmir (r. 1856–1885)	Hira Singh; Raja of Jasrota (r. 1834–1844); Raja of Poonch (r. 1843–1844); Wazir of the Sikh Empire (1843–1844))	Jawahir Singh; Raja of Poonch (r. 1846–1852)	Moti Singh; Raja of Poonch (r. 1852–1892)
Pratap Singh; Maharaja of Jammu and Kashmir (r. 1885–1925)	Lachman Singh	Ram Singh; Raja of Ramnagar (r. 1877–1899) (Note: Singh (1990), p. 44.)	Amar Singh	Baldev Singh; Raja of Poonch (r. 1892–1918)
Hari Singh; Maharaja of Jammu and Kashmir (r. 1925–1952)	Sukhdev Singh; Raja of Poonch (r. 1918–1927)	Jagatdev Singh; Raja of Poonch (r. 1927–1940)
Karan Singh; Sadr-i-Riyasat of Jammu and Kashmir (1952–1965)	Shiv Rattan Dev Singh; Raja of Poonch (r. 1940–1947)

- Indicates Raja of Jammu or Maharaja of Jammu and Kashmir

References:
- Panikkar, K. M. (1930). The founding of the Kashmir State; a biography of Maharajah Gulab Singh, 1792-1858. p. 13.
- Sufi, G. M. D. (1974). Kashīr, Being a History of Kashmir from the Earliest Times to Our Own. p. 754.
- Singh, Mohinder (1990). Raja Ram Singh: The Forgotten Prince and His Times, 1861-1899. p. 44.
