= SPS Museum =

Museum in India

Shri Pratap Singh Museum
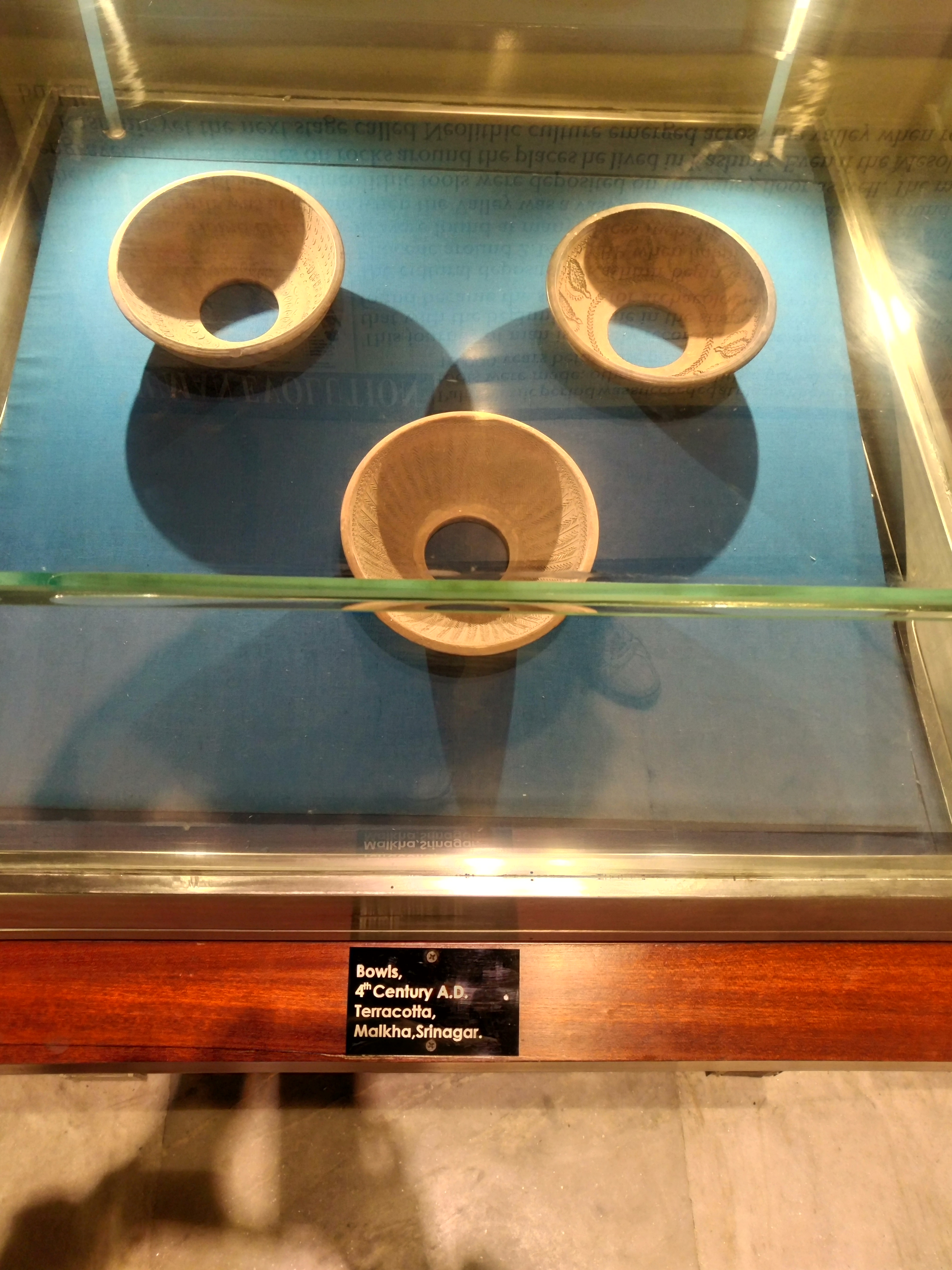
- Exhibit in the Sri Pratap Singh Museum
- Established: 1898
- Location: Wazir Bagh Srinagar, Jammu and Kashmir, India
- Coordinates: 34.06678°N 74.81312°E
- Type: Archaeological and historical

The Shri Pratap Singh Museum, commonly known as the SPS Museum, is a museum in Wazir Bagh Srinagar, Jammu and Kashmir, India. Established in 1898, the museum houses a collection of over 80,000 objects from various regions in Northern India.

== Description ==
=== History ===
In 1889, a proposal for the foundation of an archaeology museum in the city of Srinagar was formulated by Amar Singh and S.H. Godmerry. Singh was an officer in the British Indian Army, while Godmerry was a scholar. The pair produced and submitted a memorandum to Pratap Singh of Jammu and Kashmir, the ruler of Sringar and Amar's older brother. The Majarah accepted the proposal and agreed to allow for the establishment of a museum; this new institution would house artifacts from Jammu, Kashmir, Baltistan and Gilgit. The museum was to be located inside a state-owned building near the Jhelum river.

The establishment of the museum was overseen by John Marshal, a British archaeologist (and future director of the Archaeological Survey of India) who was renowned for his work in preserving the archaeological history of India. Srinagar's Accountant General, one Mr. Blerjee, was appointed as the first president of the museum; Blerjee was also tasked with recording a large collection of coins the museum added to its collection. The museum opened to the public in 1898, with its first collection consisting of items from Majarah Pratap's palace treasury.

Following the re-organizational efforts of Indian archaeologist Daya Ram Sahni in 1913, the museum received objects recovered from archaeological excavations in Panderenthan, Parihaspora and Avantipura. The collection of the museum continued to grow through the donation of items by private collectors; many of these items were domestic or household in nature.

In 2017, the museum finished constructing a second building. The new building was built to be fire and earthquake resistant, and is used to house some of the SPS's more popular exhibits. The older 19th-century building remains in use.

== See also ==
- Shashvat Art Gallery Jammu
- Dogra Art Museum, Jammu
- National Museum of India
