= Poonch House, Rawalpindi =

Pakistani government mansion

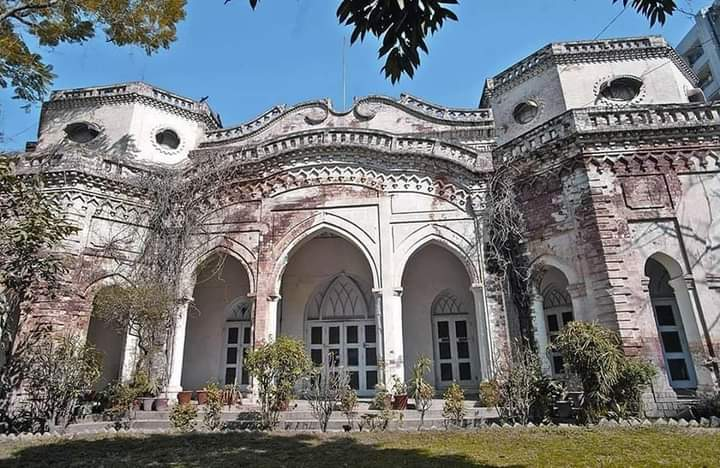
- Interactive map of the Poonch House, Rawalpindi area

General information
- Location: Rawalpindi, Pakistan
- Coordinates: 33°35′47″N 73°03′17″E
- Construction started: 1897; 129 years ago

Poonch House (Urdu: پونچھ ہاؤس) is a mansion in Rawalpindi, Pakistan.

Poonch House currently serve as the office for the AJK Election Commission. It has been used as a rest house for kings and princes of Kashmir.

== History ==
Poonch House was constructed by a ruler of Poonch jagir, Raja Moti Singh, in 1897 as a rest house. In 1914, it got taken over by the state of Jammu and Kashmir, and, in 1947, by the provisional government of Azad Kashmir. It served as the office for the Prime Minister of Azad Kashmir, until a permanent office in Muzaffarabad was established. After a few years, in 1961, it was handed to the Government of Pakistan. It is under the administration of the Ministry of Kashmir Affairs and Gilgit-Baltistan.

During Muhammad Zia-ul-Haq's regime, military courts operated on the premises. In 1986, an eight-story structure was added, including shops, offices, and residential quarters, rented at subsidized rates. A terminal for the Government Transport Service (GTS) was also built but is now vacant.

== Architecture ==
Poonch House combines European and Kashmiri architectural styles, using lime, black gram (daal mash), and clay in its construction. The mansion originally featured courtyards, balconies, and separate quarters for employees. The main hall served as a court and hosted various events. The walls were decorated with intricate artwork, and the wooden balconies were carved with traditional designs. A wooden grill in the lower balcony separated the women's quarters.

The mansion was initially painted white, though the color has faded over time. The property has reduced in size from 37 kanal to 23 kanal, 11 marla, with some areas now overgrown.
