= Shashvat Art Gallery Jammu =

Art gallery in Jammu, India

- Established: August 1930
- Location: Panjtirthi, Jammu, India
- Key holdings: Art Gallery, Museum & Manuscripts Library
- Collection size: 100,000 objects
- CEO: Shri Suresh Abrol
- Owner: Shashvat Organisation

The Shashvat Art Gallery Jammu is a cultural institution that has been showcasing the heritage of Jammu and Kashmir, India, since its establishment in 1930. It maintains a collection of old artifacts ranging from those over 300 years to modern works of art. The organisation functions with the active support of Ministry of Culture, Government of India and Government of Jammu and Kashmir. The museum is situated in Panjthirthi locality of Jammu town near Mubark Mandi Complex, Jammu. The museum houses around 100,000 items, including artifacts, artworks, craft pieces, jewelry, manuscripts, and miniatures, mostly representing the heritage of Jammu and Kashmir.

== History ==
Initially, a museum was established with collections of royal ornaments and artifacts related to Dogra maharaja and rajas of different localities of Jammu and Kashmir by Lala Rekhi Ram. It owns a collection of unique royal designs and artworks. Later, Lala Mast Ram Abrol developed the other section of the museum and added a manuscripts library. In 1999, Suresh Abrol, the grandson of Lala Rekhi Ram, expanded the collection to many folds. The gallery owns a collection of artifacts and artworks including the following:

- 7,000 manuscripts in various languages and scripts
- A 21-foot Shajra (prophetic lineage) document
- Rare miniature Paintings and Ancient Paintings
- Decorative Arts
- Manuscripts
- Royal Jewelries
- Publication
- Calligraphy on various materials
- Utensils and ornaments

== Collections ==
The gallery also houses a collection of jewelry, representing local Dogra and Gujjars traditions. From the heavy ornaments "Nau Lada" and "Sat Lada" necklaces to the intricate "Hasli" and the dazzling "Seri", these ornaments speak volumes about the cultural significance of various communities of Jammu and Kashmir. The museum has helped a number of scholars representing various universities to complete their degrees on heritage and is now nationally recognized for its invaluable treasure of art and collections of rare artifacts.

== See also ==
- SPS Museum, Srinagar
- Dogra Art Museum, Jammu
- National Museum of India
