= Moti Singh (ruler) =

Raja of Poonch from 1860 to 1892

- Raja-i-Rajgan; Raja Kalan Bahadur

Raja of Poonch
- Reign: c. 1860 – 17 May 1892
- Predecessor: Jawahir Singh
- Successor: Baldev Singh
- Died: 17 May 1892
- Father: Dhian Singh

Moti Singh was the Raja of Poonch from 1860 until his death in 1892.

== Early life ==
He was born to Dhian Singh. In 1848, a dispute arose between him, his elder brother Jawahir Singh, and Gulab Singh. At the time, he and his brother held the title of Mian. Frederick Currie mediated between them and facilitated a settlement, under which Gulab Singh granted them the title of Raja along with certain other concessions. They were required to pay a sum of Rs. 700 annually or provide one horse with gold trappings to Gulab. Additionally, they were not to make any important decisions without consulting him.

== Succession ==
He and his brother, Jawahir Singh, quarreled again in 1852. The Board of Administration for Punjab affairs intervened and facilitated a settlement between them. The board granted Poonch to him and reduced his share of the joint tribute payable to the Maharaja of Jammu and Kashmir to one-third. As a result of this decision, Gulab Singh granted him Poonch for 1,05,000 Nanakshahi rupees. His coronation was held at Mubarak Mandi Palace in Jammu by Gulab Singh. He was provided with 600 soldiers and sent to Poonch to assume control. At that time, there was no proper administrative setup in Poonch. However, the formal orders appointing him as the Raja of Poonch were not issued until 1860, the year his elder brother, Jawahir Singh, died. These orders were issued by Gulab’s successor, Ranbir Singh.

== Reign ==
When he assumed the reins of the government, there was no proper administrative setup in Poonch. He introduced a series of economic reforms and improvements to the administrative infrastructure he had inherited. In the early years of his reign, special messengers carried his correspondence between his administrative seat and Jammu, while another line of runners delivered official and private papers from the central offices to the three tehsils of Poonch. Over time, as trade increased, correspondence also grew. To accommodate this, he established a branch of his postal system in Kahuta and issued a set of four stamps in 1882. He facilitated people by providing them with loans on easy terms for reconstructing their houses, and for this purpose, wood was supplied free of cost. He also procured improved-quality seeds of wheat, maize, and rice from Punjab and distributed them to farmers in his dominions at no cost. He established both pathshalas and madrassas. He subdivided Poonch into the following tehsils: Haveli, Mendhar, Bagh, Sudhnoti, and Thakiala. These tehsils were further divided into niabats and parganas, which had thanas and police chowkis. He increased the strength of his army from 600 to 1,200 soldiers. He held his durbar three times a year—on Vasant Panchami, Dussehra, and his birthday.

== Personality ==
He was known as a welfare-oriented ruler with a secular mindset. He was widely admired for his generosity, wisdom, shrewdness, and administrative efficiency.

== Death ==
While in Jammu in 1892, he fell ill and did not recover. He died on 17 May 1892 and was cremated in Jammu. He was succeeded by his son, Baldev Singh, to his title, rank, and dignity.
