= Sukhdev Singh (Raja of Poonch) =

Raja of Poonch from 1918 to 1927

- Raja-i-Rajgan; Raja Kalan Bahadur

Raja of Poonch
- Reign: c. 1918 – 1927
- Predecessor: Baldev Singh (ruler)
- Successor: Jagatdev Singh

Sukhdev Singh Bahadur was the Raja of Poonch Jagir from 1918 until 1927.
