= History of Poonch district =

Former region in Jammu and Kashmir

Poonch Jagir
- Jagir of Princely state of Jammu and Kashmir
- 1846–1947
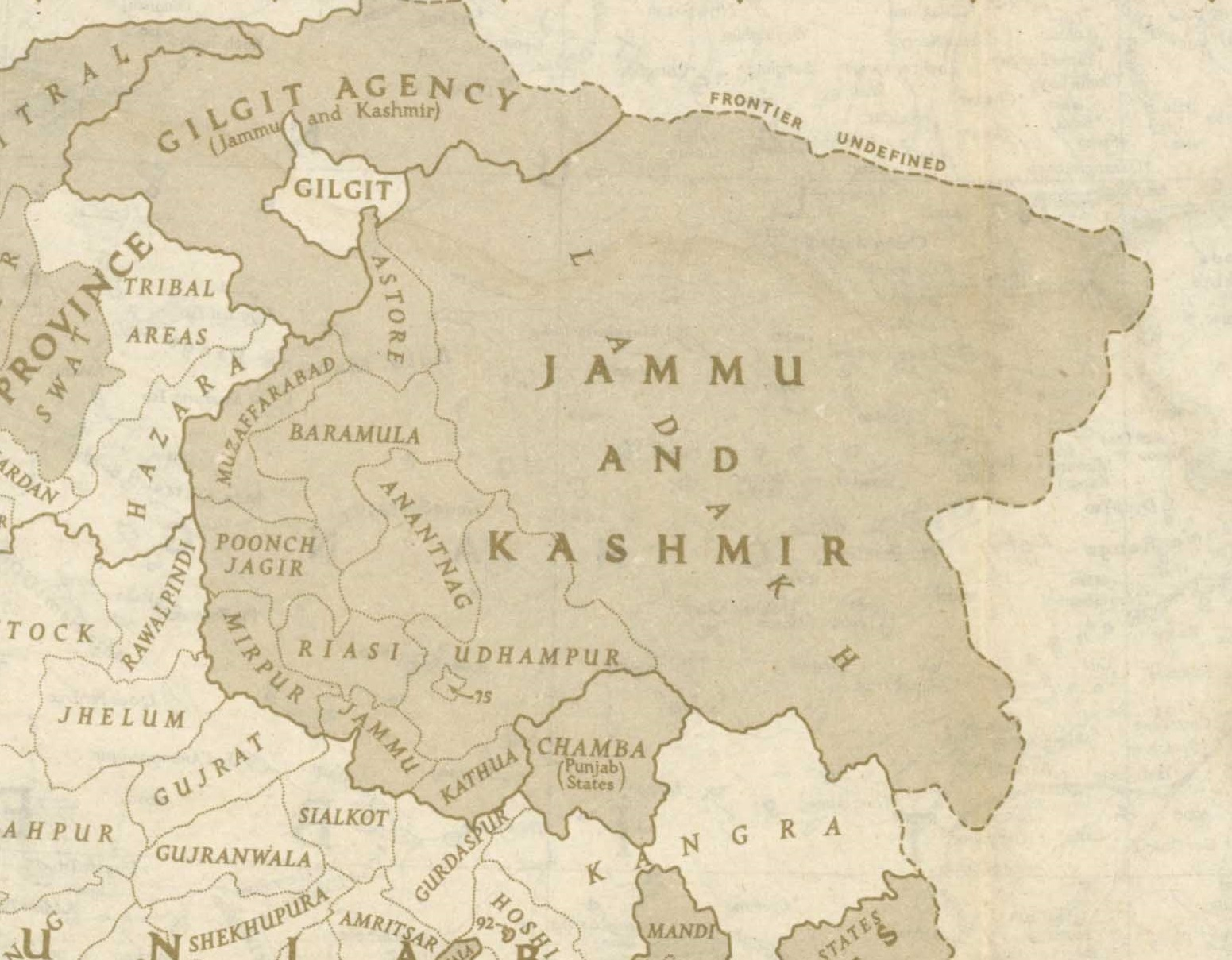
- Poonch Jagir in the 1946 map of the princely state of Jammu and Kashmir
- History
  - Established: 1846
  - 1947 Poonch Rebellion: 22 October 1947
Succeeded by
Pakistan; India
- Today part of: Poonch Division, Pakistan; Poonch district, India

Poonch jagir or Poonch district, was a former semi-autonomous region in the princely state of Jammu and Kashmir. The territory was divided between India and Pakistan in 1947, represented by the present-day Poonch Division of Azad Kashmir and Poonch District of Jammu and Kashmir.

The Sikh monarch, Maharaja Ranjit Singh captured the Poonch region in 1819 and gave it to the Dogra noble, Raja Dhyan Singh, as a jagir (fief). After the death of Ranjit Singh, Dhyan Singh was murdered in Sikh intrigues, and the region was transferred to Gulab Singh as part of the Treaty of Amritsar, which established Jammu and Kashmir as a princely state under British suzerainty. The jagir of Poonch continued among Dhyan Singh's descendants as a subsidiary fief of Jammu and Kashmir. In 1928, the Maharaja of Jammu and Kashmir started encroaching into the internal administration of the Poonch Jagir and, by 1947, the status of Poonch was like a regular district of Jammu and Kashmir.

After the departure of the British in August 1947, the tribesmen of Poonch rebelled, inviting Pakistani assistance and giving rise to the First Kashmir War. The war ended a year later with the region being divided between India and Pakistan.

== Geography ==
The Poonch Jagir in the princely state of Jammu and Kashmir was to the west of the Kashmir Valley, lying between the Jhelum River in the west and the Pir Panjal Range in the east. It was bounded by the Muzaffarabad district in the north, and Mirpur and Rajouri districts in the south.

In 1947, the jagir was administered through four tehsils (sub-districts): Sudhanoti and Bagh in the west, and Haveli and Mendhar in the east. The Poonch Town, the headquarters of the district, was located in the Haveli tehsil.

The main river of the district is the Poonch River (also called "Poonch Tohi"). It originates in the Pir Panjal Range, and flows west-northwest till near the Poonch Town and then bends south, flowing into the Mirpur district. Near the Poonch Town, it is joined by Betar Nala, which flows down from the northern part of the Haveli tehsil.

The Pir Panjal Pass, in the southeastern corner of the district, represented a key travel route into the Kashmir Valley during the Mughal times. It was accessed via Bhimber and Rajouri, and then travelling up the valley of the Poonch River due east. Another route called Tosa Maidan route lay to the north of the Pir Panjal Pass. It was accessed through the valley of the Mandi River, a tributary of Poonch.

== Early history ==
=== Ancient history ===
When Alexander invaded the lower Jhelum belt to fight Porus, the Jhelum valley region was known as Abhisara. It is likely that the Kashmir Valley controlled this region. The Abhisaras submitted to the invader, along with Ambhi of Takshashila (Taxila), and the region was consolidated into the Alexander's empire.

The Rajatarangini mentions Poonch under the name Paranotsa. Xuanzang in the 7th century transliterated it as Pun-nu-tso.

Based on the Mahabharata evidence, and evidence from 7th century Chinese traveler Xuanzang, the districts of Rajouri, Poonch and Abhisara had been under the sway of the Republican Kambojas during epic times.

At the time of Xuanzang's visit, the Kashmir Valley controlled all the territories adjacent to it in the south and the west, including Taxila, which is said to have been subjugated at a recent date.

=== Sovereign State ===
Around 850CE, Poonch became a sovereign state ruled by Raja Nar, who was a horse trader. According to Rajatrangani, Raja Trilochanpal of Poonch gave a formidable resistance to Mahmood Ghaznavi who invaded the region in 1020. Ghaznavi failed to enter Kashmir, as he could not capture the fort of Lohara (modern day Loran, in district of Poonch).

=== Kashmir Sultanate ===
Poonch came under the Kashmir Sultanate during late 15th century through the military campaigns of Malik Tazi Bhat, a general of the Sultanate. He led military campaigns that resulted in the conquest and administration of several regions, including Poonch, Jammu, Rajouri, Bhimber, Jhelum, Sialkot, and Gujrat, from 1475 to 1487. Following its incorporation, Poonch was administered as a vassal state under the Kashmir Sultanate. Local rulers retained a degree of autonomy but were required to acknowledge the suzerainty of the Sultan and provide tribute and military support when necessary.

This arrangement persisted until the late 16th century, when the region came under Mughal influence. In 1596, Mughal Emperor Jahangir granted Siraj-ud-Din Rathore rulership over Poonch, marking the end of its vassalage under Kashmir.

=== Mughal era ===
In 1596, Mughal emperor Jahangir made Siraj-Ud-Din Rathore the ruler of Poonch. During his second visit to Kashmir in 1592, Akbar had come through the Haji Pir Pass along with Jahangir (then Prince Salim), at which time Rathore had impressed them with his hospitality. Siraj-Ud-Din and his descendants ruled the Poonch area up to 1792: Siraj-Ud-Din Rathore (1596–1648), Fateh Mohammad Rathore (1648-1700), Abdul Razak Rathore (1700–1747), Mohammad Zaman Rathore (1747–1748), Asid Yaar Khan Kishtwari (1749–1760), Ali Gohar Rathore (1756–1760), Raja Rustam Rathore (1760–1786), Raja Shahbaz Rathore (1786–1792), Raja Bahadur Khan Rathore (1792–1798), Raja Sherbaz Rathore (1804–1808).

=== Durrani Empire ===
Under the leadership of Ahmad Shah Abdali, the Durrani Afghans conquered Kashmir, taking advantage of the declining Mughal Empire. From 1752 to 1819, Poonch was under Durrani rule. They ruled the region until 1819, when the Sikh Empire routed them from the Kashmir Valley, and annexed parts of Poonch (eastern half). They subsequently lost rule in any remaining territories in Kashmir.

=== Tribal Coalitions (1819–1832) ===
In the western parts of Poonch (modern day Poonch Division, AJK) the local tribes had entrenched themselves in the hills. The Muslim tribes of the region formed a defensive coalition against the Sikhs, at the head of which was the Sudhan tribe.

After Gulab Singh received the chakla of Jammu as a jagir (autonomous territory), he made renewed attempts at conquering Poonch, but the armies he raised were not large enough to defeat the resistance, and consequently he would face defeats before being forced to withdraw.

In 1832, Gulab Singh convinced Ranjit Singh to attack the coalition. Ranjit marched with an army of 60,000 troops alongside an assortment of hill cannons. The coalition made the decision to surrender, accepting the suzerainty of the Sikhs over Poonch.

== Sikh Empire (1819–1846) ==
In 1819 this area was captured by Maharaja Ranjit Singh. The Dogra brothers Gulab Singh, Dhian Singh and Suchet Singh were influential in Ranjit Singh's court. In 1822, Ranjit Singh appointed Gulab Singh as the Raja of Jammu and, in 1827, appointed Dhyan Singh as the Raja of Bhimber, Chibbal and Poonch (covering the Mirpur and Poonch districts as of 1947). Dhyan Singh spent most of his time in Lahore, subsequently becoming the wajir (prime minister) in the Sikh court. Gulab Singh is said to have managed his jagirs on his behalf.

In 1837, the hill tribes of Poonch, led by the Sudhans launched a rebellion. They captured Sikh garrisons and defeated the son of Gulab Singh, Udham Singh, who had been sent to subdue the rebellion. Though the rebels captured the majority of Poonch, after Gulab Singh returned from his campaign against the Yusufzai, he was able to incite treachery within the rebellion. Gulab Singh then attacked with an army of twenty-thousand which he had raised in Kahuta, and after fierce fighting and aid of Sikh reinforcements, he captured key forts of the rebels and their leaders, flaying alive Sudhan sardars Malli Khan and Sabz Ali Khan, executions of other commanders and notables from the rebellious tribes and killed the main leader of the rebellion, Shams Khan. Gulab Singh's forces caused devastation and massacres within captured rebel territory, due to which he faced controversy, particularly by the British, and obtained the reputation of a tyrant.

After the death of Ranjit Singh in 1839, the Sikh court fell into anarchy and palace intrigues took over. Dhyan Singh, Suchet Singh as well as Dhyan Singh's son Hira Singh were murdered in these struggles. Poonch was confiscated by the Sikh Durbar on the grounds that the Rajas had rebelled against the state and handed it over to Faiz Talib Khan of Rajouri.

== Jammu and Kashmir State (1846–1947) ==
After the First Anglo-Sikh War (1845–1846) and the subsequent Treaties of Lahore and Amritsar, the entire territory between the Beas and the Indus rivers was transferred to Gulab Singh, including Poonch. He was recognised an independent ruler, a maharaja, of the newly created state of Jammu and Kashmir. Gulab Singh reinstated the jagir of Poonch to Jawahir Singh, the eldest remaining son of Dhyan Singh.

The brothers Jawahir Singh and Moti Singh were not satisfied. They put forward a claim to being independent rulers of Poonch, maintaining that they were entitled to a share in the 'family property' of all the territories controlled by Gulab Singh. The matter was adjudicated by Sir Frederick Currie, the British Resident in Lahore, in 1852, who confirmed that Gulab Singh was indeed their suzerain. The brothers were to give the Maharaja Gulab Singh a horse with gold trappings every year and consult him on all matters of importance. The House of Poonch however continued to contest this arrangement right up to 1940.

In 1852, the brothers Jawahir Singh and Moti Singh quarrelled and the Punjab Board of Revenue awarded a settlement. Moti Singh was awarded the territory of the Poonch district, and Jawahir Singh that of the Mirpur district. Christopher Snedden remarks that Moti Singh's territory amounted to two-thirds of Dhyan Singh's estate.

In 1859, Jawahir Singh was accused of 'treacherous conspiracy' by Maharaja Ranbir Singh (r. 1857–1885), who succeeded Gulab Singh. The British agreed with the assessment and forced Jawahir Singh into exile in Ambala. Ranbir Singh paid Jawahir Singh an annual stipend of Rs. 100,000 until his death, and confiscated his territory (the Mirpur district) afterwards because Jawahir Singh had no heirs.

Moti Singh's son, Baldev Singh contested this action claiming that the territory should return to him as the sole surviving descendant of Dhyan Singh. The British did not accept the claim saying that Jawahir Singh forfeited his territory when he agreed to the annual stipend.

=== Autonomy disputes ===
After Maharaja Ranbir Singh was succeeded by Pratap Singh (r. 1885–1925), a 'Council of Administration' was imposed on Jammu and Kashmir by the British. The Council is said to have started encroaching on Poonch, egged on by Pratap Singh's brother Amar Singh. Complaints were made to the British, who continued the original line that Poonch was a feudatory of Jammu and Kashmir and so it was an internal affair of Jammu and Kashmir.

Raja Baldev Singh (r. 1892–1918), who succeeded Moti Singh, complained in 1895 that Jammu and Kashmir started referring to Poonch as a jagir, whereas he maintained that it was a 'state'. This was apparently a very emotive issue for Baldev Singh and, subsequently, to the residents of Poonch. Baldev Singh's successor Sukhdev Singh (r. 1918–1927) and Jagatdev Singh (r. 1928–1940) continued the complaints. In 1927, the British resident in Kashmir Evelyn Howell got involved and he advised Maharaja Hari Singh that, while Poonch was clearly subsidiary to Jammu and Kashmir, it was only referred to as an illaqa in the original grant, not as a jagir.

Jagatdev Singh ascended as the Raja in 1928 at a young age, and the reigning Maharaja Hari Singh (r. 1925–1949), son of Amar Singh, imposed a sanad (instruction) on him. The sanad mentioned, among others, that Poonch was a jagir and implemented several encroachments on the administration of Poonch. Frictions continued. In 1936, Jagatdev Singh sent a 'memorial' to the Viceroy of India, seeking a review of the relationship between Poonch and Jammu and Kashmir. The Government of India responded that, since Poonch was part of the state of Jammu and Kashmir, all submissions should be made through the British Resident of Jammu and Kashmir government. The Resident stated that the order of 1928, eventually based on Currie's original award, definitely settled the status of Poonch as a 'subordinate Jagirdar of Kashmir'. Jagatdev Singh's claims were dismissed without further comment.

With the death of Jagatdev Singh in 1940, his son Shiv Rattan Dev Singh became the new Raja while being a minor. Maharaja Hari Singh appointed a guardian, who was his military secretary, to look after the Raja's 'property'. The Raja's mother was prohibited from participating in the minority administration. In July 1940, a gathering of Poonch public passed a resolution expressing 'profound sorrow and deep indignation and resentment' at the Maharaja's proclamation and his description of Poonch as a jagir. By 1945, the Maharaja's administration was deeply unpopular in Poonch, especially among the families of military servicemen, who contrasted it with that of their counterparts in Punjab.

=== Administration ===
Until Jagatdev Singh's accession in 1928, the Poonch jagir was autonomous, except for the payment of a token tribute of Rs. 231 to the Maharaja of Jammu and Kashmir. The jagir had its own officials, including a bureaucracy, police and a standing army of one company. It is said that the local officials, most of whom were Hindus, were disgruntled because their salaries were lower than in the rest of state. This led to inefficiency and corruption.

The Raja of Poonch owned all the land in the jagir. The actual 'holders of land' were referred to as assamis (agents) of the Raja. In the 1930s, 40 percent of the earnings were collected as tax, amounting to Rs. 1 million. Whereas proprietary rights were granted to landholders elsewhere in Kashmir following the Glancy Commission recommendations in 1933, the Poonchis did not benefit from the reforms due to the jagir's autonomy. For some unknown reason, the residents of the Mendhar tehsil were granted ownership rights, which caused further resentment in the other tehsils.

After 1928, Maharaja Hari Singh started encroaching on the administration of Poonch and, a dual system of rule was established. A resident administrator of the Maharaja was appointed in the Poonch jagir and further officials were loaned from the state. The Raja's courts had jurisdiction only in petty cases. All serious crimes were referred to the courts in Srinagar. The Raja of Poonch lost his prestige and power.

The Maharaja also imposed additional taxes to generate his own revenue from the jagir. They included taxes on cattle and sheep, export/import taxes on items like soap and silk, and imaginative taxes on wives and widows. A 'horse tax' required a payment of 50 percent of the purchase price of a horse. Evidently, these taxes generated considerable resentment.

=== Economy ===
Scholar Christopher Snedden states that, being a mountainous area, Poonch accorded small farms with poor soil, but had high costs of living. The Kashmiri tax burden made the situation worse. Many Poonchi men worked outside the jagir to alleviate the situation. They worked in Punjab, the railways, British Indian army and the British merchant navy in Bombay. The army was an especially important employer. It was said that every male Muslim in the jagir was, had been or would be a soldier in the British Indian army. During World War I, 31,000 men from Jammu and Kashmir served in the army, a great majority of them from Poonch. During World War II, over 60,000 men from Poonch served in the army, while the rest of the state contributed only about 10,000 men. The physical proximity of Poonch to the military recruiting grounds in Punjab, such as Sialkot and Rawalpindi, facilitated their enrolment. Poonchis enlisted as 'Punjabi Musalmans' and served in the Punjab Regiment.

== Division of the Poonch Jagir ==
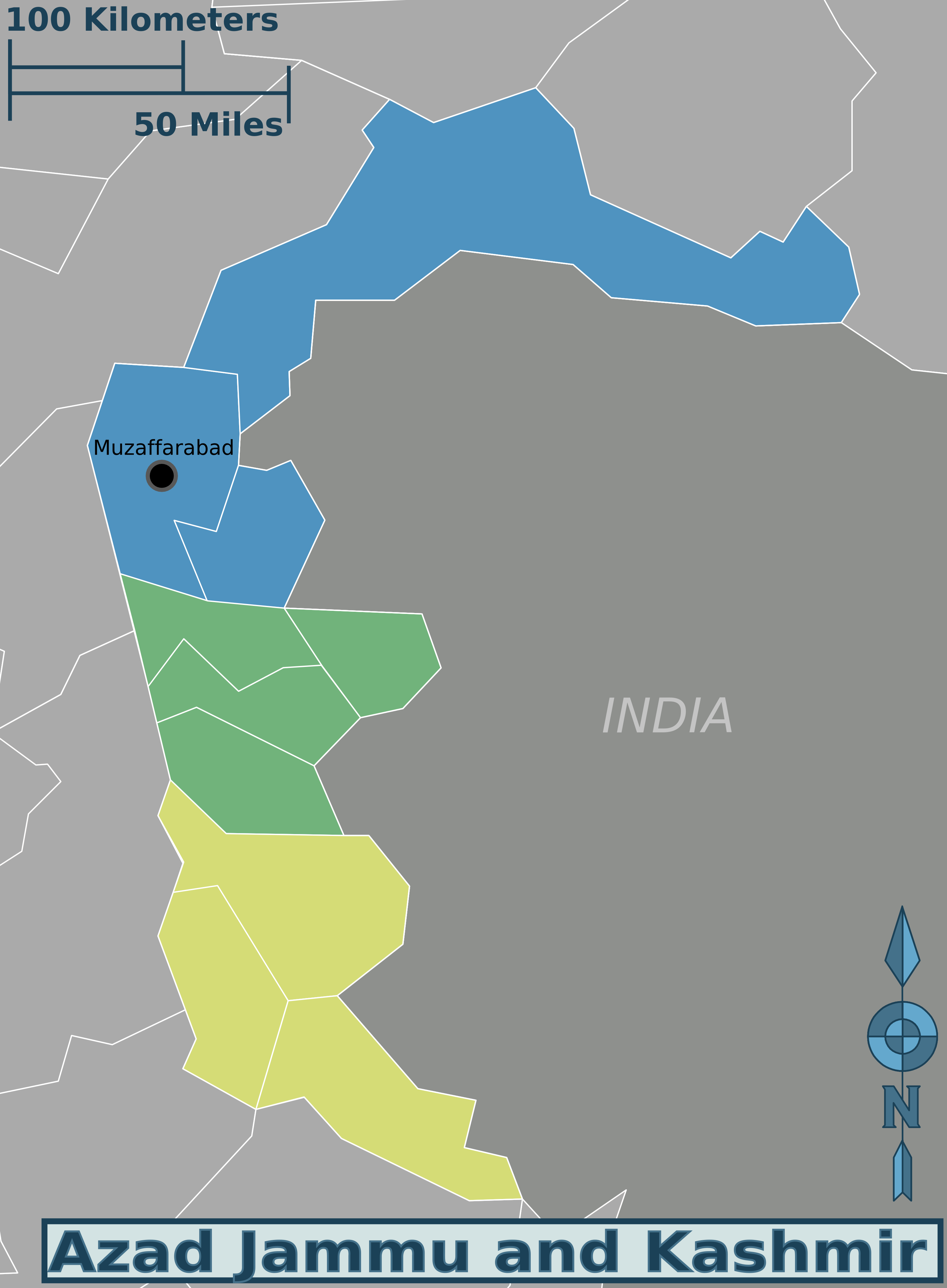
Poonch Division of Pakistan-administered Azad Kashmir (in green) in 1947

Poonch district in Indian-administered Jammu and Kashmir; with Azad Kashmir territory to its left.

After independence in 1947, there was a rebellion in the western part of the-then Poonch district. The rebels led by Sardar Ibrahim Khan, sought support from the Dominion of Pakistan, which provided arms, and then launched an invasion of its own using Pashtun tribals. In response, the Maharaja of Jammu and Kashmir joined India, and the conflict turned into an Indo-Pakistani War.

When a ceasefire was effected, the Poonch district was split across the two countries. The former capital city, Poonch, came under the Indian Poonch district, which included the southern part of the Haveli tehsil and the whole of Mendhar tehsil.

A new capital at Rawalakot was eventually established by Pakistan in the Pakistani Poonch district, which included the northern part of the Haveli tehsil and the whole of Bagh and Sudhanoti tehsils. The district itself was eventually converted into a 'Poonch Division' and divided into four separate districts: Bagh, Poonch, Sudhanoti, and Haveli.

== Rulers ==
They held the title of Raja-i-Rajgan Raja Kalan Bahadur. Below is the list of rulers and titular rulers:

Name		Notes	Reign began	Reign ended
1	Dhian Singh	Received Poonch and Mirpur as jagir from Ranjit Singh.	1827	1843
2	Hira Singh	Dhian Singh's son, also served in Lahore Durbar.	1843	1844
3	Jawahir Singh		1844	1859
4	Moti Singh		1859	1892
5	Baldev Singh		1892	1918
6	Sukh Dev Singh		1918	1927
7	Jagat Dev Singh		1927	1940
8	Shiv Rattan Dev Singh		1940	1967
9	Raman Dev Singh		1967	

== Bibliography ==
- Bamzai, P. N. K. (1994), Culture and Political History of Kashmir, M.D. Publications Pvt. Ltd., ISBN 978-81-85880-31-0
- Behera, Navnita Chadha (2007), Demystifying Kashmir, Pearson Education India, ISBN 978-8131708460
- Huttenback, Robert A. (1961), "Gulab Singh and the Creation of the Dogra State of Jammu, Kashmir, and Ladakh" (PDF), The Journal of Asian Studies, 20 (4): 477–488, doi:10.2307/2049956, JSTOR 2049956, archived from the original (PDF) on 2016-08-15
- Panikkar, K. M. (1930). Gulab Singh. London: Martin Hopkinson Ltd.
- Rai, Mridu (2004), Hindu Rulers, Muslim Subjects: Islam, Rights, and the History of Kashmir, C. Hurst & Co, ISBN 1850656614
- Schofield, Victoria (2003) [First published in 2000], Kashmir in Conflict, London and New York: I. B. Taurus & Co, ISBN 1860648983
- Singh, Bawa Satinder (1971), "Raja Gulab Singh's Role in the First Anglo-Sikh War", Modern Asian Studies, 5 (1): 35–59, doi:10.1017/s0026749x00002845, JSTOR 311654
- Snedden, Christopher (2013) [first published as The Untold Story of the People of Azad Kashmir, 2012], Kashmir: The Unwritten History, HarperCollins India, ISBN 978-9350298985
- Snedden, Christopher (2015), Understanding Kashmir and Kashmiris, Oxford University Press, ISBN 978-1-84904-342-7
