= Baldev Singh (ruler) =

Raja of Poonch from 1892 to 1918

- Raja-i-Rajgan; Raja Kalan Bahadur

Raja of Poonch
- Reign: c. 1892 – 9 September 1918
- Predecessor: Moti Singh
- Successor: Sukhdev Singh
- Died: 9 September 1918

Baldev Singh was the Raja of Poonch from 1892 until his death in 1918.

== Reign ==
Upon the death of his father Moti Singh in 1892, he succeeded him as the Raja of Poonch. On 25 March 1893, at his durbar in Jammu, Pratap Singh, the Maharaja of Jammu and Kashmir, swore him in as the Raja of Poonch. A dastur-ul-amal (transl. organon or rules of practice) was given to him at the same time. Rather than ruling by his will and discretion, he was to follow it as a constitution. When the authorities in Jammu and Kashmir began interfering in the affairs of Poonch, he wrote to Pratap Singh, asserting that the status of his dominions was not the same as that of the jagirs of Ramkot and Chenani. However, his pleas were ignored, and the authorities in Jammu and Kashmir imposed even stricter measures. He grew tired of their meddling in his state affairs and established direct links with the British authorities in Lahore. In 1901, they granted Poonch the status of a separate entity and instructed the authorities in Jammu and Kashmir to use the term ilaqā instead of jāgīr in official correspondence.

During his reign, many reforms were introduced. He aligned the administration of Poonch with modern standards. Like his father, he reigned with a secular attitude. During World War I, he remained loyal to the British Empire. He supplied 18,000 recruits to the army and contributed Rs. 1.5 million to the war effort.

== Personal life ==
He married Amba Devi and another daughter of Fateh Singh, Raja of Dhami.

== Death ==
He died on 9 September 1918 and was succeeded by his eldest son Sukhdev Singh.

== Honours ==
He was appointed Knight Commander of the Order of the Indian Empire in January 1909. For his services during World War I, he was gazetted with the honorary rank of Major in the British Indian Army in 1916 and was granted a personal salute of nine guns in 1918.
