= Jagatdev Singh =

Raja of Poonch from 1928 to 1940

- Raja-i-Rajgan; Raja Kalan Bahadur

Raja of Poonch
- Reign: c. 1928 – 1940
- Predecessor: Sukhdev Singh (Raja of Poonch)
- Successor: Shiv Rattan Dev Singh
- Spouse: Padmavati

Jagatdev Singh was the Raja of Poonch Jagir from 1928 until 1940, upon his death in 1940 - Maharaja Hari Singh used the situation to integrate the Poonch jagir into the state of Jammu and Kashmir.

== Sources ==
- McLeod, Duncan (2008), India and Pakistan: Friends, Rivals or Enemies?, Ashgate, ISBN 9780754674375
- Schofield, Victoria (2003) [First published in 2000], Kashmir in Conflict, London and New York: I. B. Taurus & Co, ISBN 1860648983
- Snedden, Christopher (2013) [first published as The Untold Story of the People of Azad Kashmir, 2012], Kashmir: The Unwritten History, HarperCollins India, ISBN 978-9350298985
