= Dogra Art Museum, Jammu =

Museum in Jammu, Jammu and Kashmir, India

Dogra Art Museum
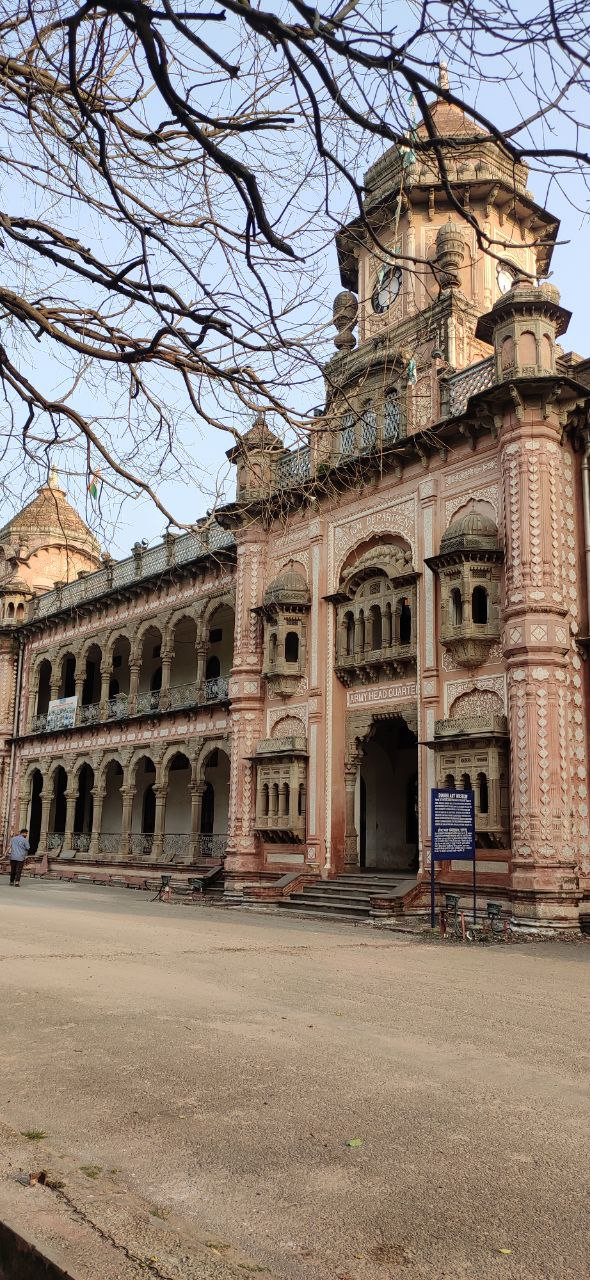

- Location within Jammu and Kashmir
- Established: 18 April 1954
- Location: Mubarak Mandi Complex, Jammu, India
- Coordinates: 32.7300°N 74.8700°E
- Type: Heritage centre
- Key holdings: Pahari painting, Shahnama & Sikandarnamain Persian
- Collections: Dogra costumes, sculptures, numismatics, manuscripts, etc.
- Collection size: 7216
- Director: Rahul Pandey IAS
- Owners: Govt. of Jammu and Kashmir, India
- Public transit access: Bus Stand, Parade

Dogra Art Museum, Jammu previously known as the Dogra Art Gallery is a museum of Dogra cultural heritage housed in the Pink Hall of the Mubarak Mandi complex, Jammu, India. The main attractions of the museum are the Pahari miniature paintings from Basohli.

== About ==
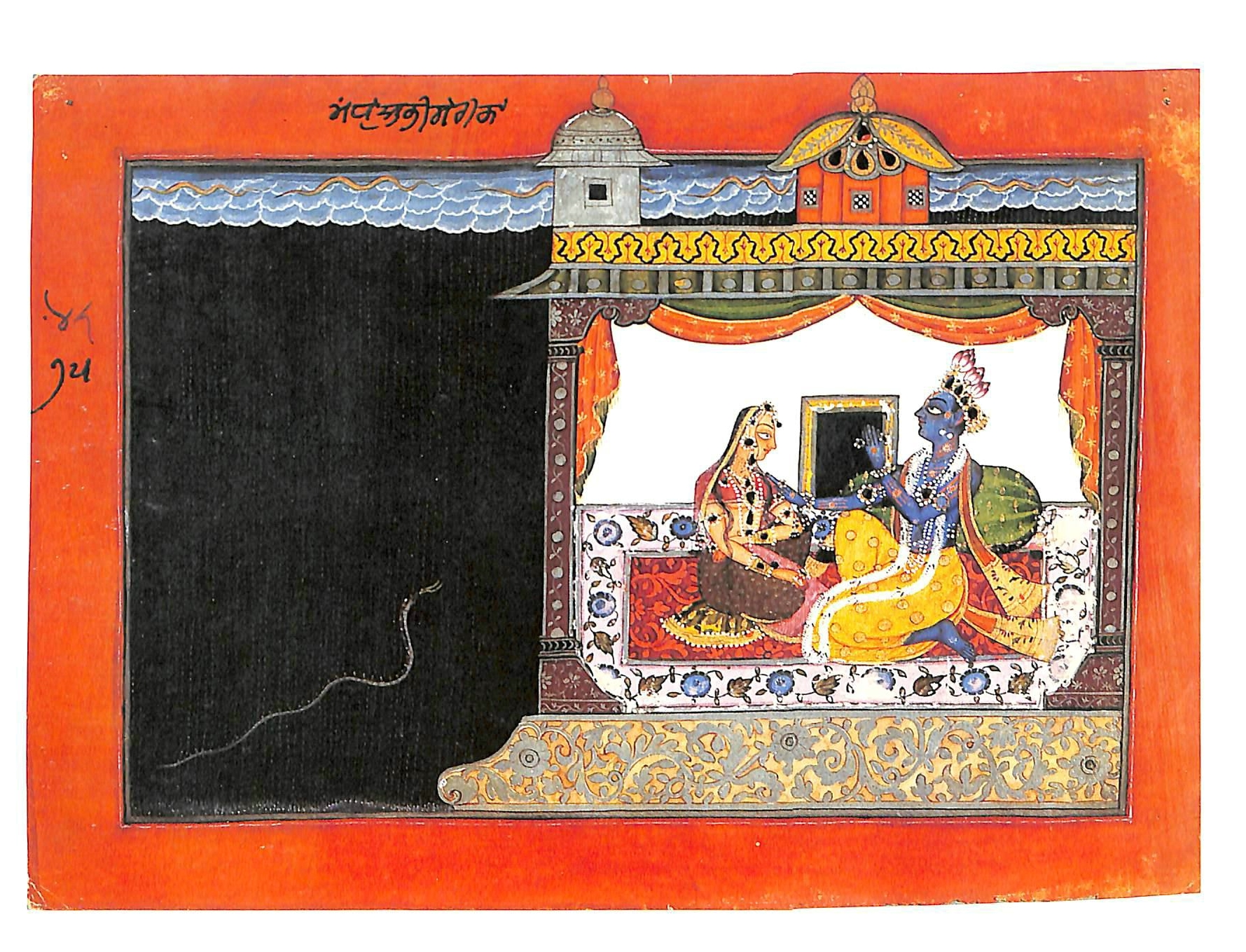
"Whom even the Snakes could not frighten on the Way": The Abhisarika Heroine. Folio from the Rasamanjari series in Dogra Art Museum

Dogra Art Museum, Jammu is a government museum and the biggest in Jammu region, one of the three divisions in the north Indian union territory of Jammu and Kashmir. The museum is unit of Directorate of Archives, Archaeology and Museums, under the Ministry of Tourism and Culture, Jammu and Kashmir Government. The building was erected in commemoration of the visit of the British Monarch Edward VII when he came to Jammu as the Prince of Wales in 1875. This building housed the Public Library as well as the Museum.

== History ==
In its initial days it was known as the Ajaib Ghar, an Urdu term for the word "Museum" (Urdu used to be the court language then) and was housed in a mini hall having some collection of arms and old photographs where now the Assembly hall has been erected within New Secretariat, Jammu. It was the first step towards setting up of a museum in the erstwhile Princely State of Kashmir and Jammu. After the states' accession with the Union of India, a committee – in the year 1954 – was organized under the president-ship of Shri Bakshi Ghulam Mohammad, the then Prime Minister of Jammu and Kashmir, Shri Ghulam Mohammed Sadiq, Education Minister, Shri G.L.Dogra, Finance Minister, Master Sansar Chand Baru famous Artist and Prof.R.N.Shastri (now Padamshri) were the members of the committee. Some space in the Gandhi Bhawan Hall adjacent to New Secretariat was allotted to this committee for housing and display of artifacts. The Museum was inaugurated by the first president of India Dr. Rajendra Prasad on 18 April 1954 at the Gandhi Bhawan, Jammu as the Dogra Art Gallery. It was upgraded to a full-fledged museum and shifted to, its present building, the Mubarak Mandi Complex, Jammu. Master Sansar Chand Baru was appointed its first Curator (Head).

== Collections ==
The museum has a collection of 7216 objects of historical and cultural importance. Among the collections are the Rasmanjari series of the famed Basohli miniature paintings and some rare manuscripts like the beautifully illustrated Shahnama and Sikandernama in Persian.

Terracotta heads from Akhnoor, Sculptures, numismatics, manuscripts, Dogra costumes, jewellery, arms and armours, metal objects and artifacts related to Decorative arts. The intricately decorated marble jharokhas with inlaid work of semi precious stones in the marble hall further embellishes the charisma of the museum collection. However, what the museum is known all over for is the Pahari miniature paintings from Basholi. A gold plated bow belonging to Shah Jehan and a stone plate with inscriptions in Takri Script are among some of the most prized possessions of the museum.

== Visitors Information ==
The museum is closed on Mondays. Entry fee of ₹10 for every Indian citizen and ₹50 for non-Indian citizens. Taking pictures inside the museum requires a payment of ₹150.

== See also ==
- Shashvat Art Gallery Jammu
- National Museum of India
