= Shiv Rattan Dev Singh =

Raja of Poonch from 1940 to 1967

- Raja-i-Rajgan; Raja Kalan Bahadur
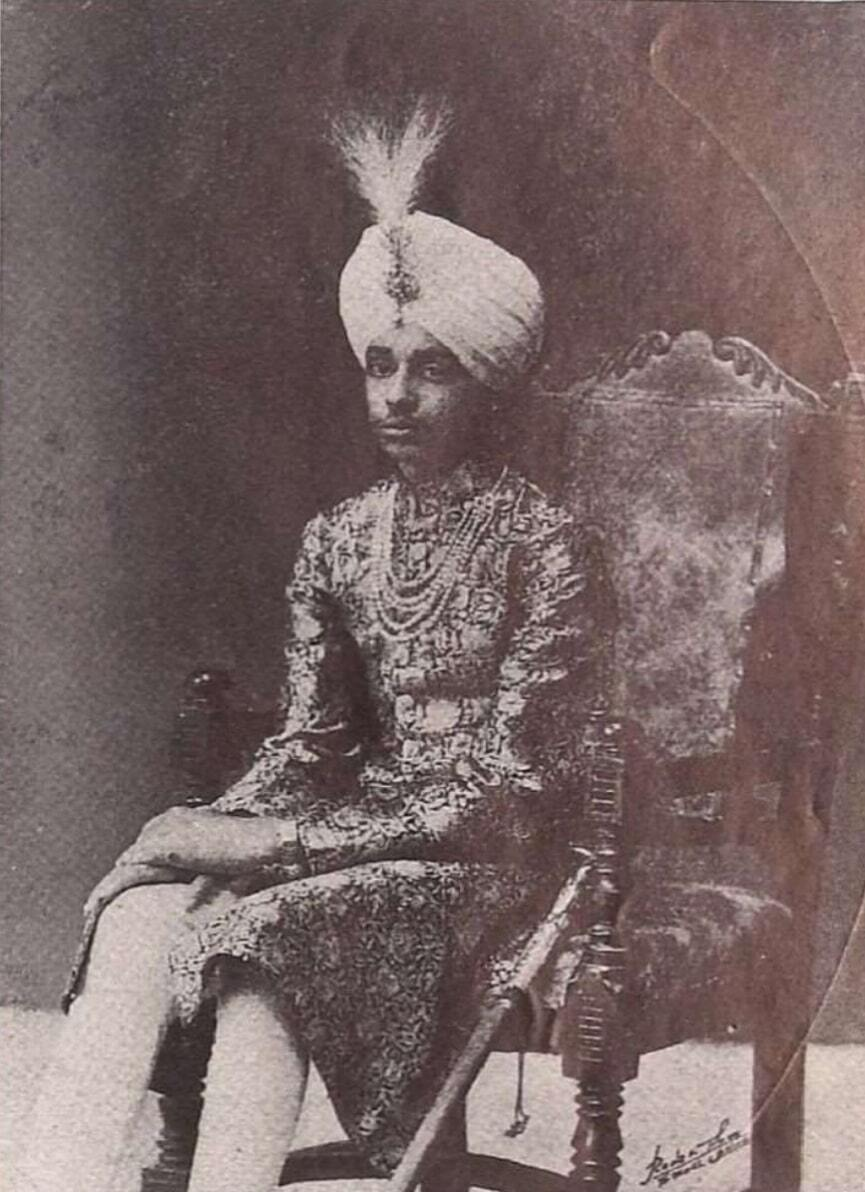

Raja of Poonch
- Reign: c. 1940 – c. 1967
- Predecessor: Jagatdev Singh
- Born: April 1925
- Died: c. 1967
- Spouse: Nalini Rajya Lakshmi Devi
- Issue: Hemlata Rajye; Rajni Kumari; Urmila Kumari; Raman Dev Singh; Ratish Dev Singh
- House: Poonch
- Dynasty: Dogra
- Father: Jagatdev Singh
- Mother: Padmavati
- Education: Aitchison College; Mayo College; University of Lucknow

Shiv Rattan Dev Singh was the Raja of Poonch from 1940 until his death in 1967.

== Birth ==
He was born in April 1925 to Jagatdev Singh, the Raja of Poonch, and his wife, Padmavati.

== Education ==
He was educated at Aitchison College, Lahore, under the supervision of a European tutor. He was later enrolled at Mayo College, Ajmer. He completed his LL.B. at University of Lucknow.

== Succession ==
Upon the death of his father in 1940, he succeeded him as the Raja of Poonch. As he was a minor at the time, the affairs of the state were administered by a regency council. The Maharaja of Jammu and Kashmir appointed Sheikh Abdul Qayum as the administrator of Poonch and Baldev Singh Pathania as his guardian. The latter remained in this role until October 1941. During his minority, Hari Singh continued appointing civilian and military officers to oversee the administration of Poonch. However, this was not well received by Shiv’s family and the people of Poonch.

== Personal life ==
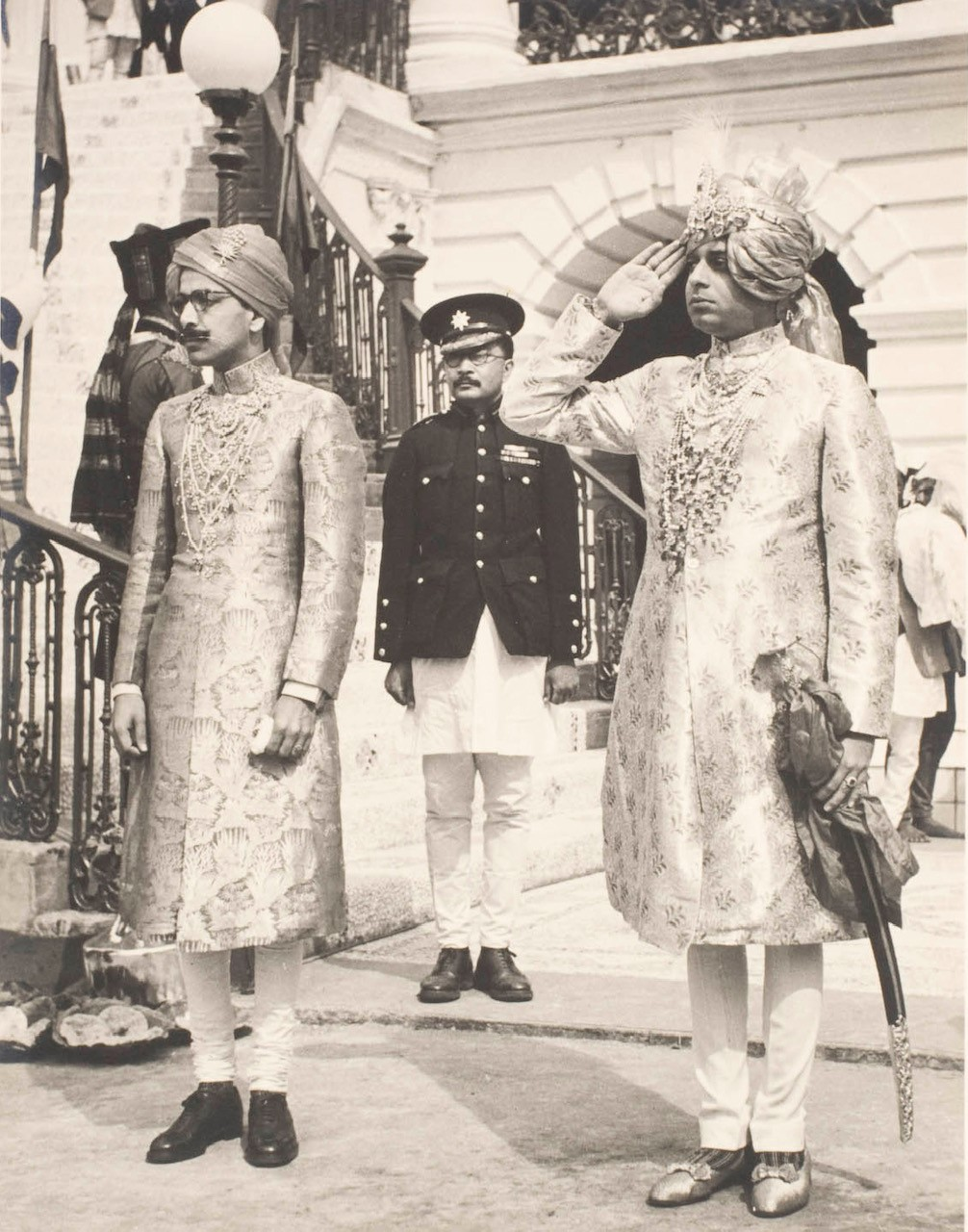
Shiv Rattan Dev Singh at Narayanhiti Palace in Kathmandu, Nepal

He married Princess Nalini Rajya Lakshmi Devi, the daughter of Tribhuvan and his wife, Ishwari. He and his wife had issue: three daughters—Hemlata Rajye, Rajni Kumari, and Urmila Kumari—and two sons, Raman Dev Singh and Ratish Dev Singh. Following the partition of India, he, along with his family, moved from Lahore to Delhi, losing his property in Lahore and Rawalpindi in the process. They then relocated to a haveli in Haridwar, built by his ancestor Dhian Singh, before finally settling in Dehradun, where he had purchased a house.

== Death ==
He died in Dehradun in 1967.
