= Stefan Norblin de la Gourdaine =

Polish painter (1892–1952)

Juliusz Stefan Norblin de la Gourdaine
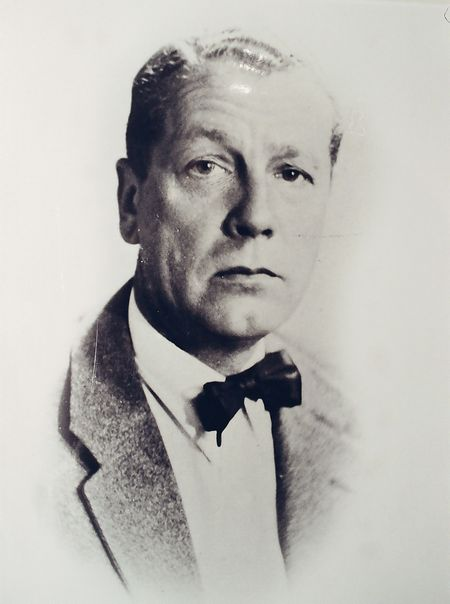
- Stefan Norblin
- Born: 26 June 1892; Warsaw, Kingdom of Poland
- Died: 12 August 1952 (aged 60); San Francisco, United States
- Resting place: Powązki Cemetery
- Occupations: Painter, illustrator, poster designer and interior designer
- Movement: Art Nouveau, Modernism, Art Deco
- Spouse: Lena Żelichowska

Juliusz Stefan Norblin de la Gourdaine (1892-1952), known as Stefan Norblin, was a Polish visual artist, painter, caricaturist, illustrator, poster designer, and interior, architectural and fashion designer. He created, among others, modernist and Art Nouveau advertising posters as well as Art Deco paintings. He also realised the interior decoration (frescoes) of several rooms of the Umaid Bhawan Palace in Jodhpur, Rajasthan, India.

== Biography ==
=== Origins and childhood ===
Stefan Norblin was born in Warsaw on 26 June 1892, into a wealthy industrialist family. On the artistic side, one of his ancestors was his great-great-grandfather Jean-Pierre Norblin de La Gourdaine, a French painter. The latter moved to Poland in 1774 at the invitation of Adam and Izabela Czartoryski, to be employed as a drawing teacher for the prince's children. He lived there till 1804, marrying Polish women. One of Jean-Pierre's son, Alexandre Jean Constantin Norblin, returned to Poland in 1819: he was the great-grandfather of Stefan.

Stefan is the son of factory owners: his grand-uncle Wincenty founded the Norblin, Bracia Buch i T. Werner a Joint-stock company of metal factory, which was taken over by Stanisław Ignacy, Stefan's father.

In 1910, Stefan graduated from the Antwerp's Academy of Economy and Trade and took a job at a paper company. Notwithstanding, he rapidly turned to painting in Antwerp and Dresden.

He made his debut in 1913, when he participated in an exhibition in Amsterdam, at the Memling Gallery. Afterwards, he went to mingle among artistic societies in Paris and London under an assumed name.

=== Interwar years ===
After Poland regained independence, Norblin lived in Warsaw where he achieved success as a graphic artist and designer, creating posters, book covers, costumes and stage decors. In particular, he realised during this interwar period a series of posters promoting Polish cities, following a commission by the Polish Ministry of Communication.

In 1920, Stefan volunteered for taking part in the Polish–Soviet War as a translator. As such he participated as an interpreter in the peace conference in Riga at the end of 1920. At the end of the conflict, he returned to Warsaw and opened a studio in Mazowiecka street. He soon became a popular artist among some of the celebrated and influential characters of interwar Poland. In particular, his Art Deco-style portraits were very appreciated. Hence Norblin had the privilege to paint portraits of Józef Piłsudski, Jan Wedel, Edward Rydz-Śmigły or Stefania Grodzieńska.

He briefly married the silent-movie star Maria Modzelewska and after a divorce he become bethrothed in 1933, to Lena Żelichowska, also a famous actress and dancer. In 1937, Stefan was invited to an exhibition at the prestigious Society for the Encouragement of Fine Arts in Warsaw (Polish: Towarzystwo Zachęty Sztuk Pięknych w Warszawie).

Lena's and Stefan's careers developed and the couple had a villa built in the outskirts of Warsaw, Willa Kaskada. The edifice, an ancient dye house, had been personally redesigned by the artist into a residential modernist home, with elements of art deco. Norblin even included in his plans a room for a film studio for his wife Lena: the project never saw completion.

The "Willa Kaskada" was razed during WWII; a commemorative plaque unveiled in 2012 can be seen on the site, now located in the Keller's Ponds Park in Warsaw.

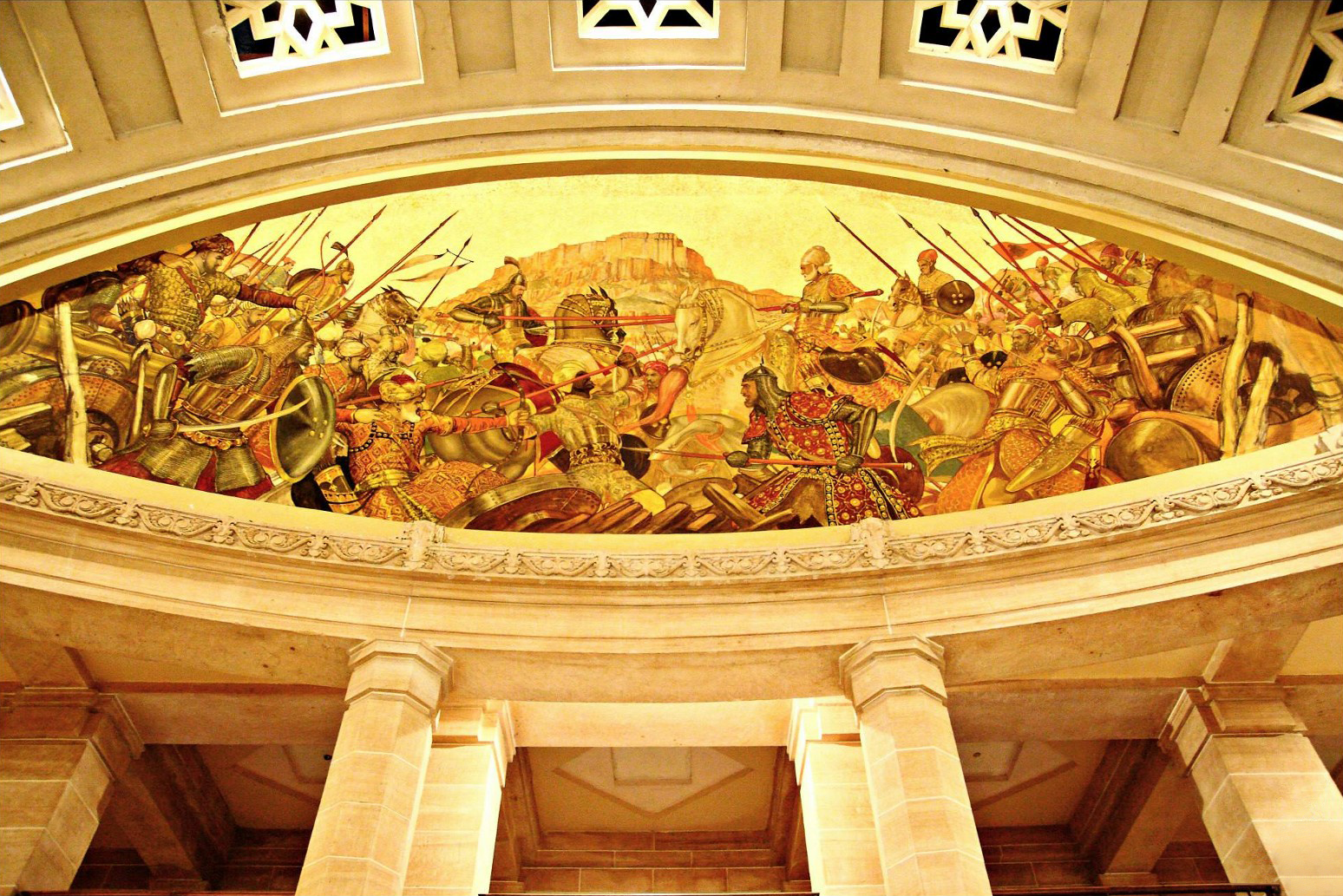
Interior fresco at the Umaid Bhava Palace

=== Second World War ===
At the start of the Invasion of Poland in September 1939, the couple left the country for Romania, accompanied by writer and journalist Marian Hemar, then the husband of Stefan's first wife. Afterwards, the Norblins intended to find shelter in United States, traveling through Asia.

On the way, they initially stayed in Persia and Iraq where he painted the country's royal family and the British Ambassador. Having received the necessary visas, the couple moved to India. Here they settled and Norblin began exhibiting his work in top galleries, attracting the attention of rich patrons. There he started to paint portraits of the local aristocracy.

Following a commission by Maharaja Lakhdhirija Waghdjia of Jodhpur, Stefan created a series of frescoes combining art deco and Indian mythology, in order to decorate the interior of the Umaid Bhawan Palace, the largest private residence in the country. In addition, Norblin decorated:

- the Patna palace of Maharaja Kamakhya Narain Singhs Ramarha (1943);
- the Sardar Samand hunting lodge, built in 1933 for Maharaja Umaid Singha;
- the Darbargadh Palace in Morbi, Gujarat.

The couple's son, Andrew, was born in India in 1944, and the local climate had regularly a bad effect on the toddler's health. His condition became so serious that the Maharaja of Jodhpur sent a private plane to bring medicine for the child.

=== Post war years ===
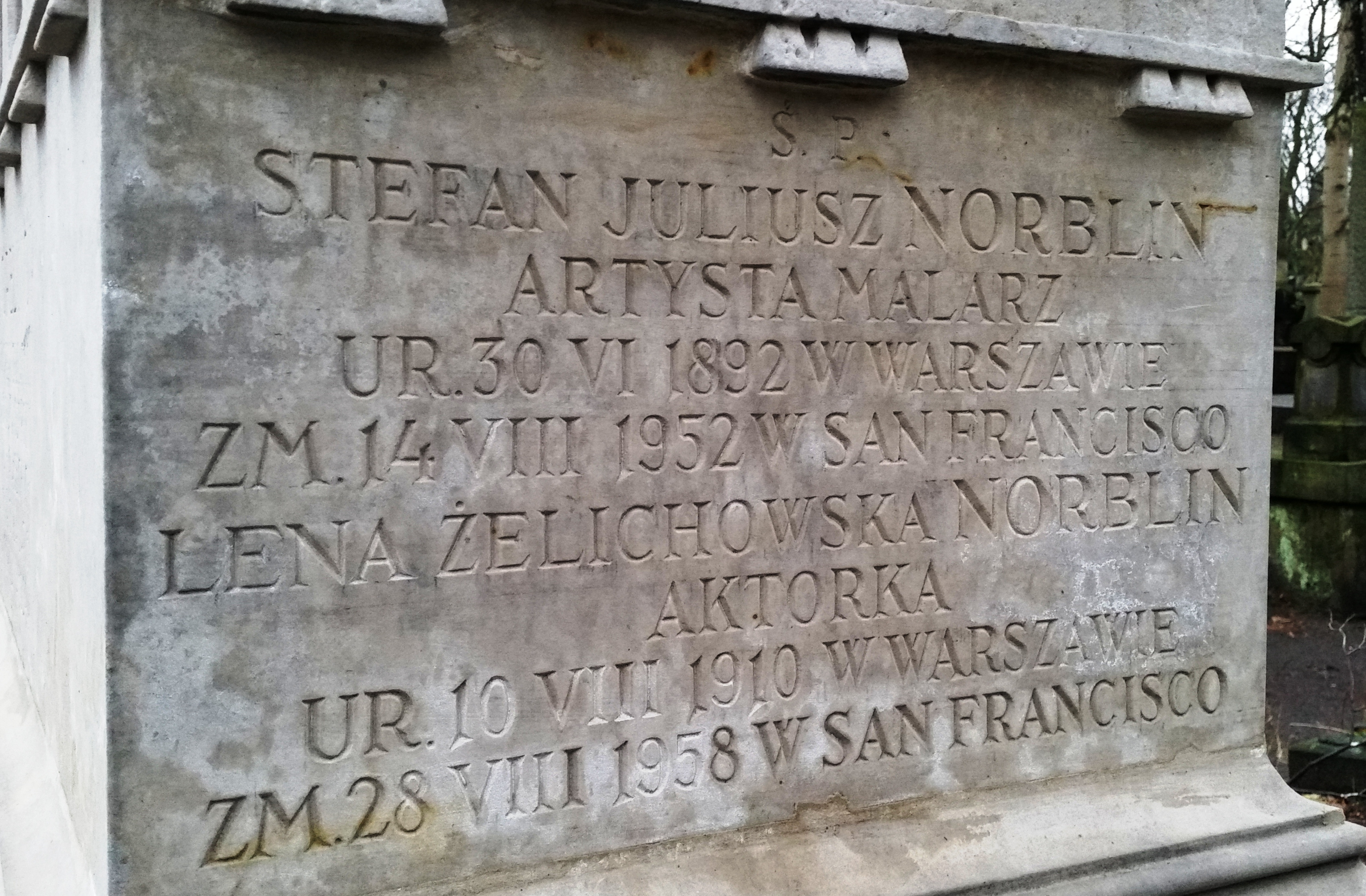
Lena and Stefan tombstone, Warsaw

After the war, unwilling to return to Poland under Communist control, the family moved to San Francisco on 22 August 1946, where Norblin earned his living as a portrait painter. In particular, his painting of General Douglas MacArthur, hangs now in The Pentagon.

By and large, he received few commissions and after a while, he stopped painting as his eyesight began to falter due to glaucoma: Norblin quickly slipped into depression and in 1952, the artist took his own life, not wanting to become a burden on his family.

His wife Lena survived him 6 years, taking on various jobs. She died on 26 August 1958, at the age of 48.

On October 12, 2012, with the consent of their son Andrew, the ashes of Stefan Norblin and his wife were transferred back to Poland and buried in the family tomb at the Powązki Cemetery in Warsaw. The ceremony was attended by the Minister of Culture and National Heritage, Bogdan Zdrojewski.

== International resurgence ==
For decades after Norblin left for the US, his Indian works remained largely unknown. Little was known about them in Poland and the rest of Europe, and in India the artist was forgotten – to the point that he was sometimes mistakenly called Snorblin, due to a misreading of the artist's signature, "S. Norblin", left on the paintings.

Between 2006 and 2008, the Ministry of Culture and National Heritage, in cooperation with the Maharaja of Jodhpur, the Ministry of Foreign Affairs of the Republic of Poland and the Embassy of the Republic of Poland in New Delhi, has run a vast restoration plan of Norblin's interior paintings in Jodhpur.

In 2007, Polish Television produced a documentary film directed by Robert Ćwikliński, titled Stefan Norblin, relating the artist's life.

In 2011, another documentary was shot, Chitraanjali. Stefan Norblin in India (Polish: Chitraanjali. Stefan Norblin w Indiach); it was directed by Małgorzata Skiba and produced by the National Audiovisual Institute (Polish: Narodowa – Instytut Audiowizualny) in cooperation with the Polish Embassy in New Delhi. The film depicts Norblin's work in India, combining European motifs with Indian mythology and culture. This documentary received an Honorary Mention in the prestigious Los Angeles Film Awards in 2012.

Further research and comprehensive promotion of Norblin's work has been carried out by the National Institute of Polish Cultural Heritage Abroad "Polonika" (Polish: Narodowy Instytut Polskiego Dziedzictwa Kulturowego za Granicą „Polonika”) established in 2017. The institute produced the following films about the artist:

- an animated film, Eternal Fire (Polish: Wieczny ogień), which brings to life six scenes from the Oriental Hall and one of the paintings from the Umaid Bhawan Palace in Jodhpur;
- a documentary, Ramayana in the Palace in Jodhpur. Recovered Thread in the Works of Stefan Norblin (Polish: Ramayana w pałacu w Jodhpurze. Odzyskany wątek w twórczości Stefana Norblina).

=== Exhibitions ===
- An exhibition, "Stefan Norblin (1892-1952). Master of Many Arts" (Polish: Stefan Norblin (1892-1952). Artysta Wszechstronny), was displayed at the Regional Museum of Stalowa Wola (September 2011), then traveled to New Delhi at the National Gallery of Contemporary Art (November 2011) and Mumbai (December 2011 – January 2012). It notably comprised a series of 16 portraits painted in Poland, Iraq and India.
- A retrospective of Norblin's poster works (Art beyond time. Stefan Norblin 1892–1952) happened from 12 October 2012 to 31 January 2013 at the Poster Museum in Wilanów.
- From 28 February to 31 March 2024, an exhibition about Norblin's posters (Stefan Norblin – artysta plakatu) occurred in Warsaw at the Fabryka Norblina, the ancient family factory, now revamped into a cultural area and a shopping centre.

== Family ==
- Jean-Pierre Norblin de La Gourdaine (1745-1830), French painter, draughtsman, engraver and caricaturist.
  - Louis-Pierre Norblin (1781-1854), French musician.
  - Sébastien Norblin (1796-1884), French painter.
  - Aleksander Jan Konstanty Norblin (1777-1828), Polish sculptor on bronze.
    - Jan Piotr Sylwin Norblin (1812-1870), teacher at the Nobility Institute in Warsaw.
    - Wincenty Norblin (1805-1872), Polish philanthropist and industrialist, co-founder of the Norblin, Bracia Buch i T. Werner.
    - Adam Julian Norblin (1814-1873)
      - Ludwik Norblin (1836-1914), plater and co-founder of the Norblin, Bracia Buch i T. Werner. The metal factory of silverware and industrial metal components located in Warsaw operated in the years 1834-1939. It moved in 1882, on Żelazna Street. In 1947, after nationalization it became the Walcownia Metali "Warszawa", operating till 1981. Today, it has been converted into urban premises encompassing offices, shops, restaurants, an eco-bazaar, a boutique cinema and an open-air museum.
      - Stanisław Ignacy Norblin (1859-1920), Polish industrialist, banker and social activist.
        - Juliusz Stefan Norblin (1892-1952)
          - Andrew Norblin (born 1944), professional guitarist.

== Gallery ==
Poster. Gdynia

Poster. Lwów - Polish Railways

Poster. Wilno - Polish Railways

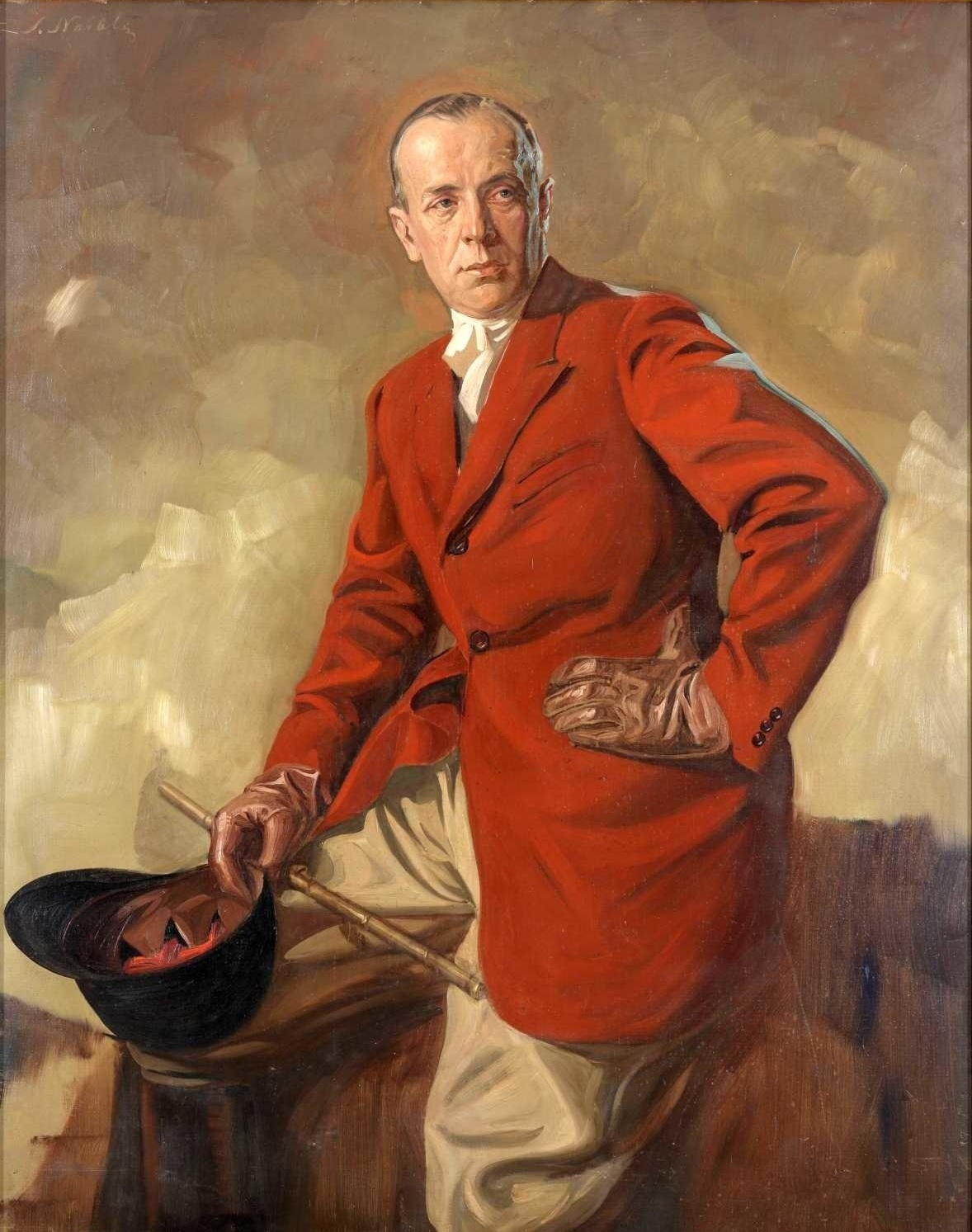
Portrait of Kazimierz Skarżyński

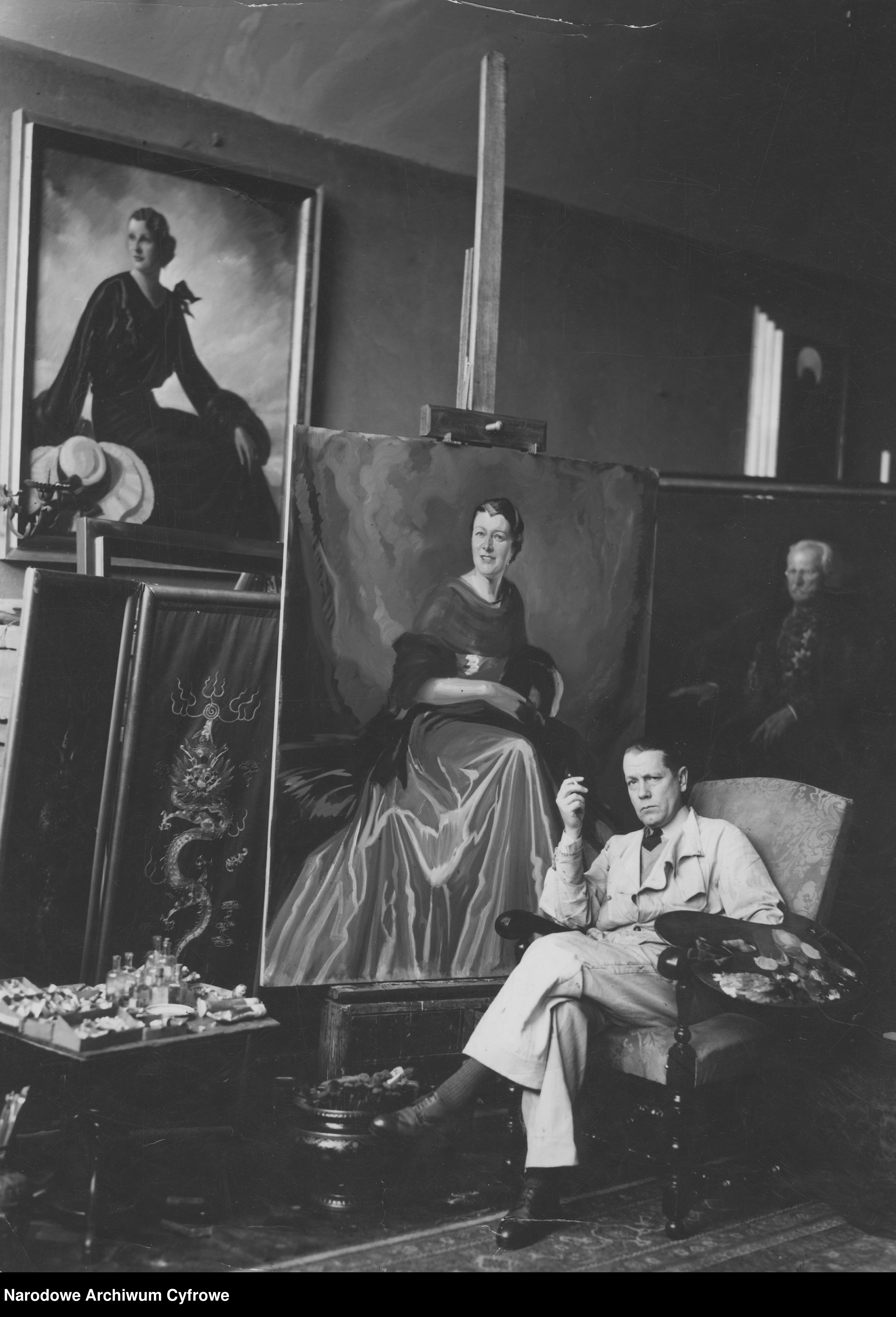
Stefan Norblin in his Warsaw studio, 1935

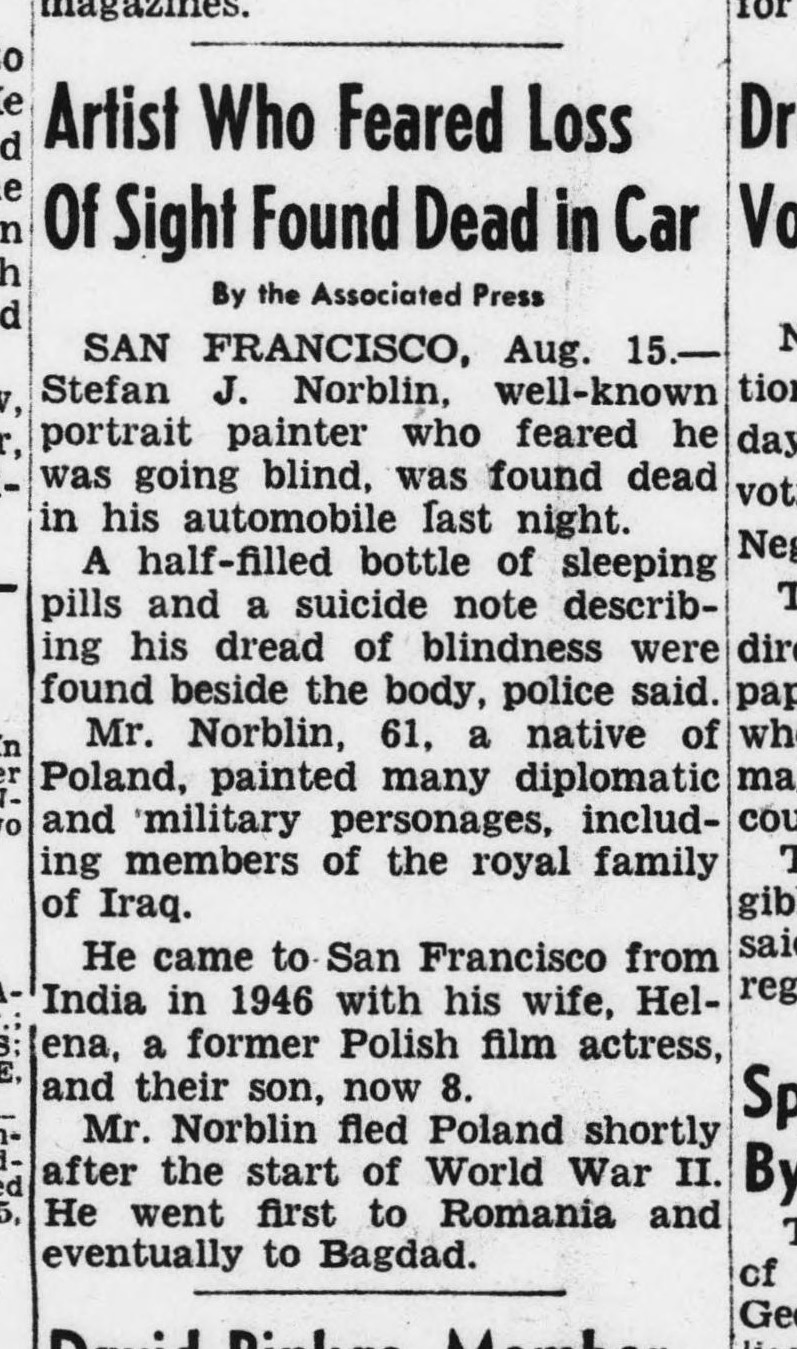
Evening Star's article relating Stefan Norblin death

== See also ==
- List of Polish people
- Umaid Bhawan Palace
- Sultan Palace (Patna)
- Sardar Samand
- Morbi

== Bibliography ==
- Rudowski, Jan (1992). Polski słownik biograficzny T. 33 [Polish Biographical Dictionary Vol. 33 (1991-1992)] (in Polish). Wrocław: Zakład Narodowy im. Ossolińskich - Wydawnictwo Polskiej Akademii Nauk. pp. 501–515.
- Kasprzak, Agnieszka (2021). Norblin. Malarstwo [Norblin. Painter]. Lesko: Bosz Art. ISBN 978-83-7576-499-4.
