= Murder of Hukum Singh =

1981 crime in India

Hukum Singh
- Born: Rao Raja Rathore; 2 August 1951; Jodhpur
- Died: 17 April 1981 (aged 29)

Rao Raja Hukum Singh Rathore (2 August 1951 – 17 April 1981), also known as Tutu Banna, was the son of Maharaja Hanwant Singh, ruler of Jodhpur, and Zubeida Begum. Hukum Singh was the younger paternal half-brother of Maharaja Gaj Singh, who succeeded his father to the throne. He was the younger maternal half-brother of Khalid Mohamed, an Indian journalist, editor, film critic, screenwriter and film director.

== Early life ==
Hukum Singh's parents were both killed in an airplane accident in 1952 when he was under one year old, so he was brought up by his stepmother Krishna Kumari. He later went to study at Mayo College in Ajmer. He married Rao Rani Rajeshwari Kumari Rathore, daughter of Rao Raja Daljit Singh of Alwar. The couple had one son, Parikshit Singh Rathore (b. 1974) and one daughter, Jainandini Kanwar (b. 1975).

Hukum Singh was described as "pampered, but also hot-tempered and restless". In 1974, he was charged with attempted murder for twice pointing a pistol at a police officer and threatening to kill him. The case was dismissed by the High Court of Rajasthan, who stated that while this may have been criminal intimidation, it was not attempted murder since Hukum Singh did not fire the weapon.

== Death ==
On 17 April 1981, Hukum Singh's body was found hacked to death with his own sword, with over 20 injuries on his body. There are at least three versions of what happened.

The official version is that he was drinking whiskey with four or five other men, became abusive, and was killed with his own sword.

Alternatively, he is said to have been quietly sleeping in a charpoy in the garden of his official residence when he was violently attacked by unknown assailants.

Finally, he was known to have been unhappy with property matters and his status in the family and had met his stepbrother Maharaja Gaj Singh the night before his death. In his autobiography My Passage from India, Ismail Merchant alleges that he and Gaj Singh were present at a dinner ceremony at the Umaid Bhawan Palace when Hukum Singh charged in, brandishing a sword, and was hacked to death. Merchant and his publishers were sued for defamation, with Merchant later stating that the passage was written "tongue firmly in cheek".

A suspect named Guman Singh was arrested but mysteriously disappeared before trial. The murder remains unsolved.

== See also ==
- List of unsolved murders (1980–1999)
