= Shivraj Singh of Jodhpur =

Indian polo player

Shivraj Singh
- Yuvaraja
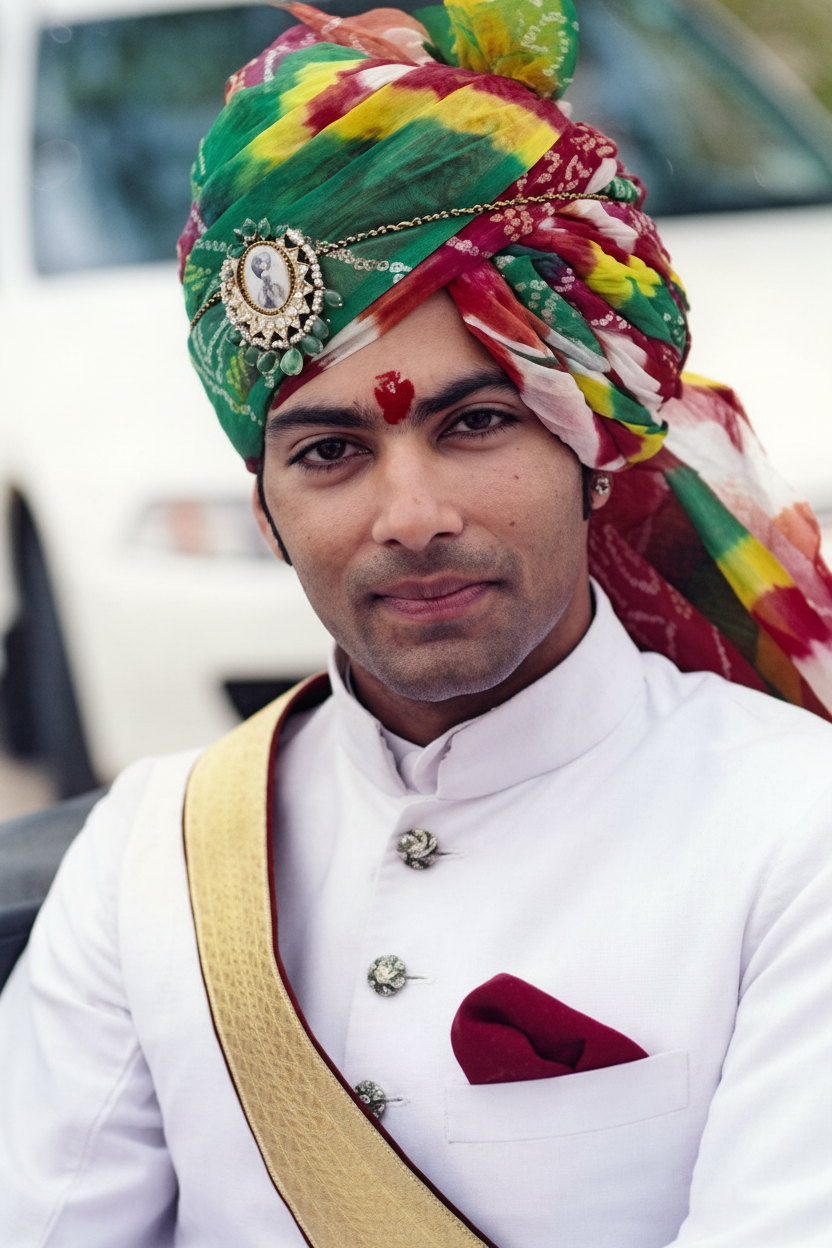
- Shivraj Singh of Jodhpur
- Born: 30 September 1975 (age 51); Jodhpur, Rajasthan, India
- Spouse: Gayatri Kumari Pal (m. 2010)
- Issue: Vaara Kumari Rajye; Siraj Deo Singh
- Father: Gaj Singh II
- Mother: Hemlata Rajye

Shivraj Singh (born 30 September 1975) is a retired Indian polo player and member of the former royal family of Jodhpur. He is the son and heir apparent of Gaj Singh II, and the grandson of Maharaja Hanwant Singh of Jodhpur and his first wife, Krishna Kumari of Dhrangadhra.

== Education ==
Shivraj was educated at Mayo College in Ajmer, then moving on to Eton College, where he played polo for Eton. After leaving Eton, Shivraj studied at Oxford Brookes University, where he received a degree in Business Administration.

== Career ==
After graduating from university, Shivraj worked with the Schroder's Bank of Geneva and London and Jardine in Hong Kong before returning home. He is now involved in the business of managing the palace hotel group which includes Umaid Bhawan, Bal Samand, Sardar Samand, and various festivities and functions involving the Jodhpur Royal Family and the regional heritage and cultural governance of Jodhpur region.

== Polo career ==
Shivraj is a polo player. He is primarily responsible for training the Jodhpur polo team.

=== Rambagh accident ===
He suffered a serious head injury during a Birla Cup match at the Rambagh Polo Ground in February 2005. Shivraj slipped into coma and was rushed to the SMS Hospital after he lost consciousness. There was a clot in his brain, so on 21 February he was taken to Mumbai for surgery at Tata Hospital, but he remained in a coma for over two months. Eleven months later, he had recovered enough to speak in short sentences and move about in a wheelchair. His first public appearance since the accident was at his father's 58th birthday party held on the Baradari Lawns on 13 January 2006; however, he watched from his balcony. His elder sister, Shivranjani Raje, told reporters he is active and rehabilitating with the help of an American occupational physiotherapist. He can reportedly walk with some assistance.

== Marriage ==
He got engaged to Gayatri Kumari Pal from Lucknow, of the former royal family of Askot in Uttaranchal on 10 March 2010. The engagement ceremony took place at the Umaid Bhawan Palace in Jodhpur, in the presence of Shivraj's father, Gaj Singh II, mother Hemlata Rajye and elder sister, Shivranjini Rajye.

Gayatri was studying computer graphics and animation. Their wedding took place on 18 November 2010 at the Rambagh Palace in Jaipur. The wedding was a grand affair, with much media attention.

The couple has one daughter, Baiji Lal Sahiba Bhanwar Baisa Vaara Kumari Rajye, born 10 December 2011. On 16 November 2015, a boy, Raj Bhanwar Siraj Deo Singh, was born to the couple.

== Ancestry ==
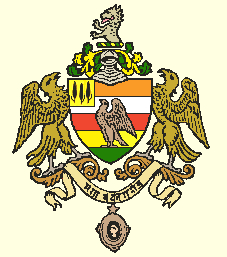
Princely arms of the Princes of Jodhpur.

His mother, Hemlata Rajye, is daughter of the late Raja Shivratan Deo Singh of Poonch and Princess Nalini Rajye Lakshmi of Nepal in Dehradun. He has a sister who was born on 22 August 1974, Shivranjani Rajye.

He is a descendant of King Tribhuvan of Nepal and through King Tribhuvan, he is a descendant of popular personalities such as Maharaja Jang Bahadur Kunwar Ranaji, Kaji Tularam Pande, Sardar Ramakrishna Kunwar and Kaji General Amar Singh Thapa.
