= Shivranjani Rajye =

Indian businesswoman

- Born: 22 August 1974 (age 52); Jodhpur, Rajasthan, India
- Occupation: Business
- Parent(s): Gaj Singh; Hemlata Rajye
- Relatives: Shivraj Singh, Chandresh Kumari Katoch, Sailesh Kumari

Shivranjani Rajye is a princess of the royal family of Jodhpur State, the daughter of Former Maharajah Gaj Singh and Hemlata Rajye. She has one younger brother, Shivraj Singh of Jodhpur. She is a businesswoman and owns the Jodhpur Girls Polo team. She is a curator and manager of the Umaid Bhavan Palace, Mehrangarh Fort.
