= Rajamata =

Sanskrit for queen mother

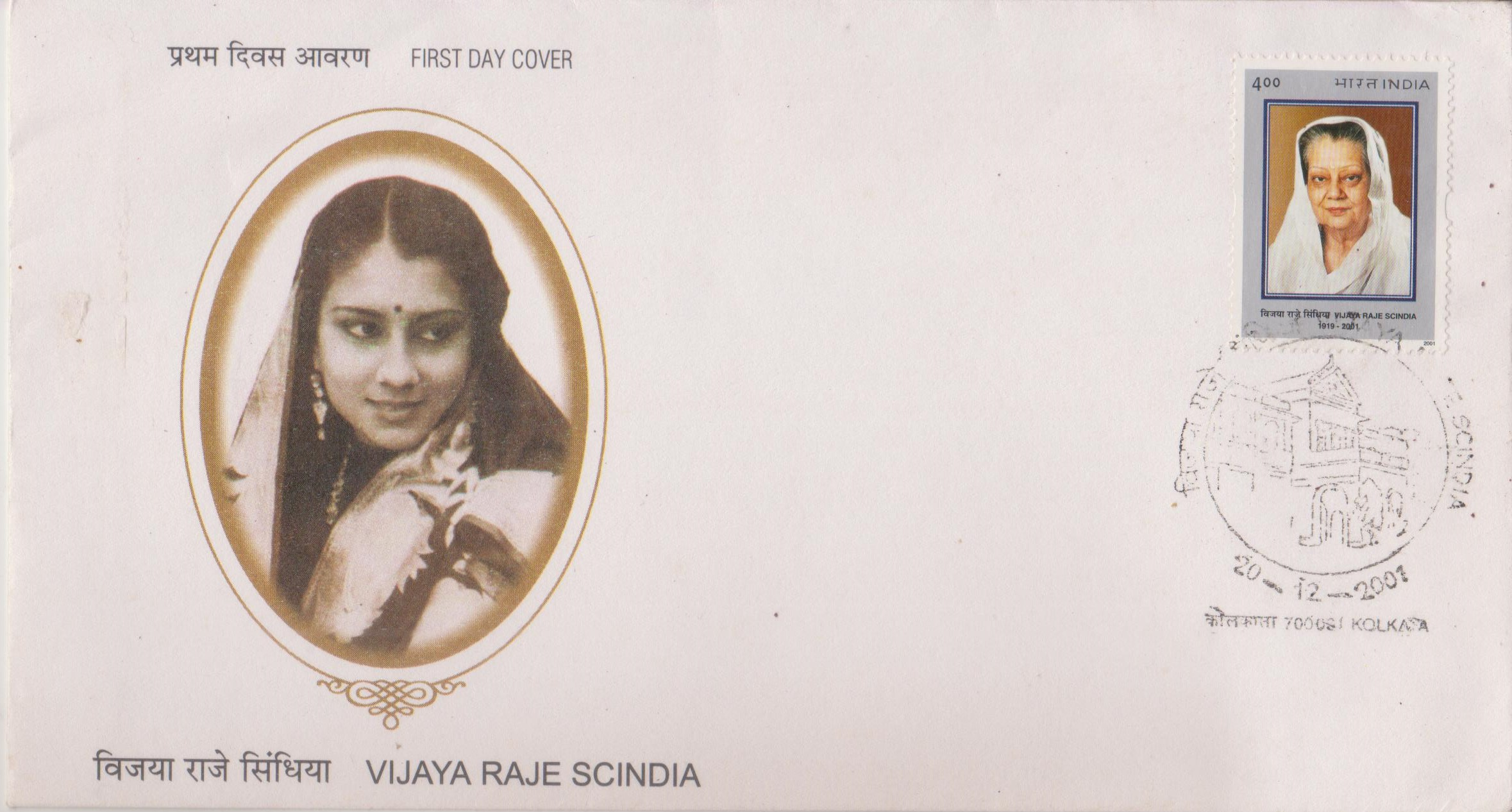
Vijaya Raje Scindia of Gwalior

Rajamata is a Sanskrit term used for the mother of a raja (transl. King). It is also employed to address the queen dowager. In the contemporary period, it is most commonly used to address the head of a royal dynasty in India.

== Examples ==
- Rajamata Jijabai of Maratha Kingdom, mother of Shivaji
- Rajamata Vijaya Raje Scindia of Gwalior, mother of Madhavrao Scindia
- Rajamata Gayatri Devi of Jaipur, step-mother of Bhawani Singh
- Rajamata Padmini Devi of Jaipur, wife of late Bhawani Singh
- Rajamata Krishna Kumari of Marwar (Jodhpur), mother of Gaj Singh
- Rajamata Mohinder Kaur of Patiala, mother of Amarinder Singh
- Rajamata Ahilyabai Holkar of Indore, mother of Malhar Rao Holkar
- Rajamata Dr. Pramoda Devi Wadiyar of Mysuru (Mysore), adoptive mother of Yaduveer Krishnadatta Chamaraja Wadiyar
