= Sultan Palace =

The term Sultan Palace or Sultan's Palace may refer to:

- Sultan's Palace, Zanzibar, in Tanzania
- the Kraton Ngayogyakarta Hadiningrat, in Yogyakarta, Indonesia
- Sultan Palace (Patna), in Patna, India

also:

- Sultan Palace Hotel, in Sana'a, Yemen
