= Jacqueline van Maarsen =

Dutch author and bookbinder (1929–2025)

- Born: Jacqueline Yvonne Meta van Maarsen; 30 January 1929 Amsterdam, Netherlands
- Died: 13 February 2025 (aged 96) Amsterdam, Netherlands
- Occupation: Bookbinder, author

Jacqueline Yvonne Meta van Maarsen (Dutch pronunciation: [ʑɑkəˈlin iˈvɔnə ˈmeːtaː vɑ ˈmaːrsə(n)]; 30 January 1929 – 13 February 2025) was a Dutch author and bookbinder. She was best known for her friendship with diarist Anne Frank. Her Christian mother was able to remove the J (Jew) signs from the family's identity cards (van Maarsen's father was Jewish) during the Second World War, thereby helping the van Maarsens escape the Nazis.

== Early life ==
Van Maarsen was born in Amsterdam to a Dutch-Jewish father, Samuel "Hijman" van Maarsen (1884–1952), and a French Christian mother, Eulalie Julienne Alice "Eline" van Maarsen (née Verlhac) (1891–1992). Van Maarsen has a sister, Christiane. Van Maarsen studied in a regular school in Amsterdam until 1940, when Germany invaded the Netherlands. Then she had to move to a Jewish lyceum. In the Jewish school, she befriended many girls, including Anne Frank, Nanette Blitz, Sanne Ledermann and Hanneli Goslar. Van Maarsen was the secretary of the ping-pong club started by her friends, Little Dipper Minus Two.

Anne Frank and Van Maarsen became best friends, and they often visited each other's houses and did their homework together. Van Maarsen sincerely liked Anne, but found her at times too demanding in her friendship. In July 1942, Anne's family went into hiding, but Van Maarsen did not know about this.

Anne, in her diary later, was remorseful for her own attitude toward Van Maarsen, regarding with better understanding Van Maarsen's desire to have other close girlfriends as well – "I just want to apologize and explain things", Anne wrote. After two and a half months in hiding, Anne composed a farewell letter to Van Maarsen in her diary, vowing her lifelong friendship. Van Maarsen read this passage much later, after the publication of the diary.

Meanwhile, the occupying German Nazi forces were arresting Jews throughout the country. Van Maarsen, who was half-Jewish by Nazi standards, felt the threat of arrest. Because she was Christian, Van Maarsen's mother was able to remove the "J" (Jew) signs from the family's ID cards. This act helped the Van Maarsens to escape from the Nazis, and it allowed Van Maarsen to transfer out of the Jewish school and back into general education.

Most of her father's side of the family perished during the war. Many were in Nazi concentration camps including Auschwitz and Sobibor.

== After the Second World War ==
After the war, Van Maarsen came to know Anne had not survived. Otto Frank, Anne's father, got in touch with Van Maarsen, and she was one of the first people to whom Otto Frank showed Anne's diary. In 1947, The Diary of a Young Girl was published.

Van Maarsen became an award-winning bookbinder. She married her childhood friend, Ruud Sanders, in 1954. They had three children. She wrote five books on her friendship with Anne Frank.

== Later life and death ==
Van Maarsen still lived in Amsterdam and had seven grandchildren.

She began giving speeches about Anne Frank in different schools in Germany and the United States. Additionally, she appeared in the 28 November 2008, documentary Classmates of Anne Frank.

Van Maarsen wrote five books about her friendship with Anne Frank.

Van Maarsen died in Amsterdam on 13 February 2025, at the age of 96.

== Books ==
- Anne and Jopie (1990)
- My Friend, Anne Frank (1996)
- My Name Is Anne, She Said, Anne Frank (2003)
- A Friend called Anne (2004)
- Inheriting Anne Frank (2009)

== See also ==
- List of people associated with Anne Frank
