= Hemlata Rajye =

Maharani of Jodhpur since 1973

- Maharani of Jodhpur
- Born: 2 May 1951
- Spouse: Gaj Singh (m. 1973)
- Issue: Shivranjani Rajye; Shivraj Singh
- House: Jodhpur (by marriage); Poonch (by birth)
- Father: Shiv Rattan Dev Singh
- Mother: Nalini Rajya Lakshmi Devi

Hemlata Rajye is the Maharani of Jodhpur. She is by birth a Rajkumari of Poonch.

== Biography ==
She was born on 2 May 1951 as the eldest daughter of Shiv Rattan Dev Singh, Raja of Poonch, and his wife, Nalini Rajya Lakshmi Devi. She is the maternal granddaughter of Tribhuvan, the King of Nepal, and his wife, Ishwari. She married Gaj Singh, the Maharaja of Jodhpur, on 19 February 1973 in Dehradun. She and her husband have two children: Shivranjani Rajye and Shivraj Singh.

== Titles and styles ==
Styles of Hemlata Rajye
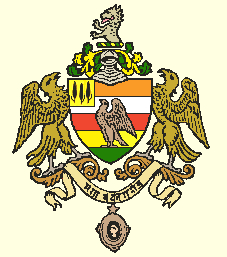
- Reference style: Her Highness
- Spoken style: Your Highness

Hemlata became the Maharani of Jodhpur upon her marriage to Gaj Singh. She is entitled to the style of Her Highness.
