= My Name Is Anne, She Said, Anne Frank =

- First edition
- Author: Jacqueline van Maarsen
- Publisher: Arcadia Publishing
- ISBN: 1-905147-10-4

My Name Is Anne, She Said, Anne Frank is a 2003 memoir-book written by Jacqueline van Maarsen. The book was about the friendship of the author with the famous diarist, Anne Frank. Van Maarsen, who had previously written two books about Anne, had been giving lectures about her childhood friend since 1987.
