= Janina Altman =

Polish-Israeli Holocaust survivor (1931–2022)

- ינינה אלטמן
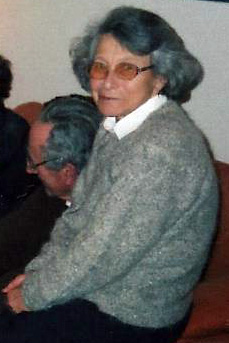
- Born: Janina Hescheles; 2 January 1931; Lwów, Poland
- Died: 24 July 2022 (aged 91); Israel
- Education: Technion – Israel Institute of Technology
- Known for: Holocaust survivor, author
- Notable work: Oczyma dwunastoletniej dziewczyny (Through the Eyes of a 12-year-old girl)
- Spouse: Kalman Altman
- Scientific career
- Fields: Chemistry
- Workplaces: Technion – Israel Institute of Technology, Weizmann Institute of Science, Technical University of Munich

Janina Altman (Hebrew: ינינה אלטמן) (née Hescheles; 2 January 1931 – 24 July 2022) was a Polish-Israeli chemist, author and a Holocaust survivor.

== Life ==
Janina Hescheles' father, Henryk Hescheles, was a journalist in Lwów and publisher of the Polish-language Zionist periodical Chwila. Her mother was registrar at a hospital on Józef-Dwernicki Street, and after the outbreak of World War II also served as a nurse.

The family lived with her grandparents in the Jewish Quarter of Lwów, a city which at the time was about one-fourth Jewish. When Nazi Germany invaded Poland in September 1939, Hescheles' uncle, Marian Hemar, a brother of her father, was able to flee from Warsaw to Great Britain. In 1939, under terms of the Nazi-Soviet Pact, Lwów was annexed to the Soviet Union, becoming part of Soviet Ukraine.

The day after the Germans invaded the Soviet Union in June 1941 and conquered Lwów, Hescheles' father was murdered in a pogrom perpetrated by the Ukrainian population of Lwów. However, another uncle, Stanisław Lem, managed to conceal his Jewish heritage and survived. Janina and her mother survived the pogrom. Then they and Hescheles' grandparents and other relatives were imprisoned by the Nazis and forced to work in the German armaments factories. However, with help from the writer Michał Borwicz and the Polish resistance organization Żegota, she was able to escape from the Janowska concentration camp in October 1943.

Hescheles was hidden by various families from Kraków (Cracow) in an orphanage in Poronin, in southern Poland. Three weeks after her escape, with encouragement from Borwicz, Janina Hescheles began writing a memoir of their persecution in Lwów. In 1946, soon after the war ended, it was published in Polish as Oczyma dwunastoletniej dziewczyny ("Through the Eyes of a 12-year-old girl") by the Organization of Polish Jews in Kraków. Later on, a German translation, Mit den Augen eines zwölfjährigen Mädchens, was published in East Germany (1958) and in West Germany (1963). Since 2011 it has been published in ten different languages.

In 1950, Hescheles emigrated to Israel, where she eventually earned a doctorate in chemistry at Technion (the Israeli Institute of Technology). She married the physicist Kalman Altman, and they had two sons. Hescheles (now known as Janina Altman) continued to work at Technion and the Weizmann Institute of Science, and also at the Technical University of Munich, Germany. Her research has been published in several English and German scientific journals. Since the First Intifada (1987–1991), she supported the activist group Women in Black.

== Bibliography ==
- Hescheles, Janina. My Lvov. A Holocaust Memoir of a twelve-year-old girl Amsterdam Publishers, January 2020; ISBN 9789493056299
- Original memoir written in 1942: Oczyma dwunastoletniej dziewczyny. (Re-edited) Centralna Żydowska Komisja Historyczna, 2015; ISBN 978-83-65254-05-4
- Hescheles, Janina: Mit den Augen eines zwölfjährigen Mädchens. [In:] Im Feuer vergangen.Tagebücher aus dem Ghetto (in German). Rütten & Loening, Berlin (1962), pp. 345–411
- Hescheles-Altman, Janina. Con los ojos de una niña de doce años: (in Spanish). Hermida Editores S.L. (2014); ISBN 9788494176746
  - Catalan translation: Amb els ulls d´una nena de dotze anys. Riurau Editors, Barcelona 2015; ISBN 978-84-943249-5-6
  - Janinan päiväkirjat. Teinitytön muistelmat Lvivin ghetosta ja Janowskan keskitysleiriltä (in Finnish). Like, Helsinki 2015; ISBN 978-952-01-1299-8
  - Яніна Гешелес: Очима 12-річної дівчинки (Переклав Андрій Павлишин), (in Ukrainian). Дух і Літера, Київ (2011)
  - A travers les yeux d'une fille de douze ans (in French), Classiques Garnier, Paris, 2016
- Altman, Janina (under the pseudonym Zvia Eitan), They are still alive (in Hebrew), Tel-Aviv, Alef (1969); winner of the ACUM Israeli Award
- Altman, Janina (under the pseudonym Zvia Eitan), What will tomorrow bring? (in Hebrew). Tel-Aviv, Alef (1972)
- Altman, Janina. Gold, From the depth of the Earth to Outer Space (in Hebrew). Ramat Gan, Masadah (1977)
- Altman, Janina. The White Rose. Students and intellectuals in Germany after the rise of Hitler (in Hebrew). Pardes (2007)
  - German translation of first part of The White Rose: Naturwissenschaftler vor und nach Hitlers Aufstieg zur Macht (2013)
