= Zubeida Begum =

Indian actress (1926–1952)

- Born: Zubeida Begum Mehta; 1926
- Died: 26 January 1952 (aged 25–26); Sumerpur
- Spouse: Hanwant Singh I of Marwar (m. 1950–1952; their deaths)
- Issue: Khalid Mohamed; Prince Hukum Singh
- Father: Qasembhai Mehta
- Mother: Faiza Bai

Vidya Rani (born Zubeida Begum) (1926 – 26 January 1952), often known as Zubeida or Zubeidaa, was an Indian actress who is mainly known for her relationship with Hanwant Singh I of Marwar, Maharaja of Jodhpur.

== Early life ==
Zubeida Begum was the daughter of Qasembhai Mehta, a Bohra Muslim businessman, and his wife Faiza (or Fayazi) Bai, a singer in Bombay.

== Acting career ==
Much about Zubeidas life is unclear and this includes her acting career. While its possible that she acted in movies in minor uncredited roles, it may also be possible that she was confused with the similarly named Zubeida Begum Dhanrajgir.

According to her son Zubeida had aspirations to become an actress but this was forbidden by her father.

== Personal life ==
A Shia Muslim by birth, Zubeida converted to Hinduism according to Arya Samaj rites to marry Maharaja Hanwant Singh of Jodhpur, on 17 December 1950, in Bombay. She took on the name Vidya Rani and moved to Jodhpur. She gave birth to the couple's son, Rao Raja Hukum Singh (also known as Tutu Bana), in Bombay on 2 August 1951.

She also had a son, Khalid Mohamed, from her first marriage. Her first husband left for Pakistan after their son was born.

A film critic, Mohamed wrote the screenplay for the film Zubeidaa (2001), directed by Shyam Benegal, loosely based on her life.

== Death ==
Zubeidaa was killed with her husband in an airplane accident on 26 January 1952 at Sumerpur Godwar, Rajasthan.

After her death, Tutu was brought up by Rajmata of Jodhpur. He later went to study at Mayo College in Ajmer. He married Rao Rani Rajeshwari Kumari, daughter of Rao Raja Daljit Singh, of Alwar. The couple had one son, Parikshit Singh (b. 1974) and one daughter, Jainandini Kanwar (b. 1975).

On 17 April 1981, Tutu was found beheaded on the streets of Jodhpur.

Till date, a legend persists that her unsatisfied soul haunts the palace and the royal family's school near the palace. Several rooms in the school are sealed with huge locks, allegedly holding her dancing spirit.

== Bibliography ==
- Khalid Mohamed (2012). Two Mother and Other Stories. Om Books. ISBN 978-9381607091.
