= Liesbeth Heenk =

International publisher, author and art historian

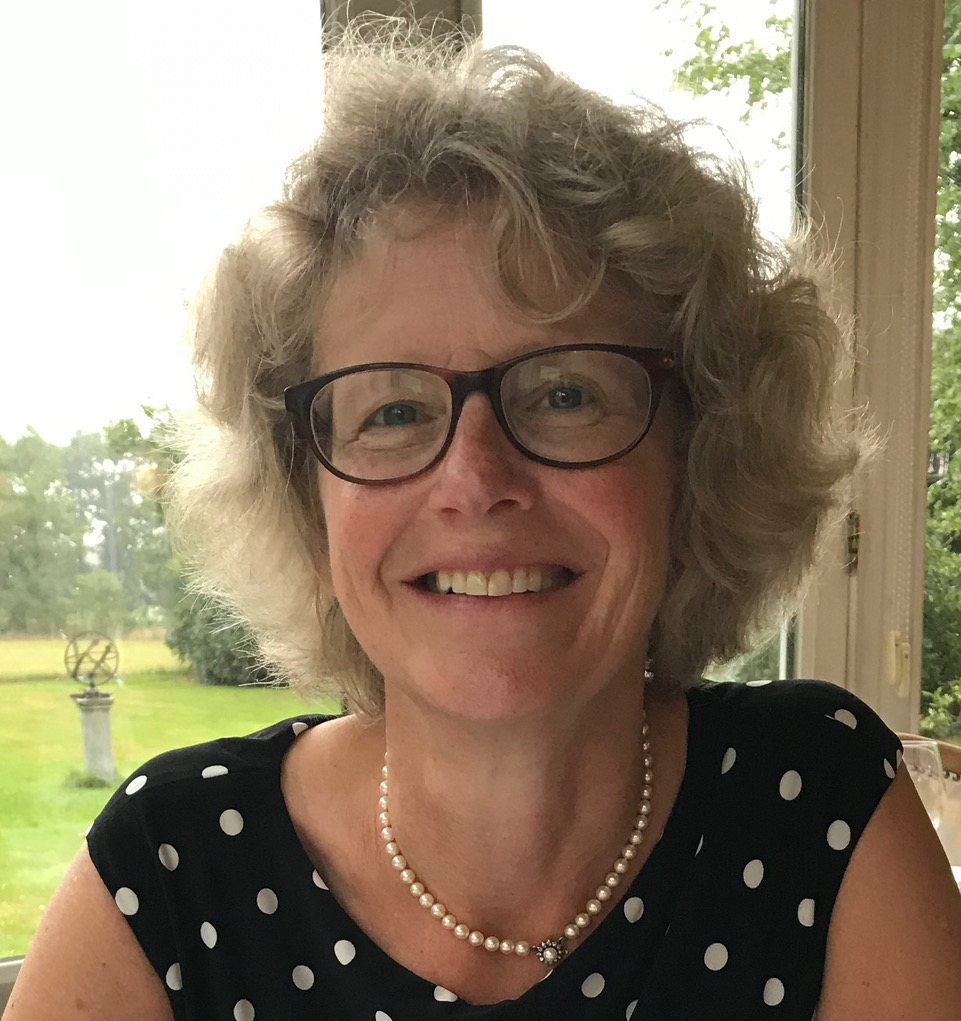
- Heenk in 2019
- Born: May 1, 1962 (age 63)
- Education: BA, MA Leiden University; PhD (1995) Courtauld Institute of Art
- Known for: Founder of Amsterdam Publishers, Vincent van Gogh art historian
- Website: https://amsterdampublishers.com

Liesbeth Heenk (born May 1, 1962) is an international publisher, author and art historian specialised in Vincent van Gogh. She is the founder of Amsterdam Publishers which is the largest international publisher of Holocaust memoirs in Europe.

== Biography ==
After obtaining her BA and MA degree in art history at Leiden University, Heenk worked as assistant curator for the Van Gogh 1990 centenary exhibition held at the Kröller-Müller museum in Otterlo. She wrote her PhD at the Courtauld Institute of Art on 'Vincent van Gogh's Drawings: An Analysis of their Production and Uses' (1995). Her findings were covered in The Art Newspaper.

During her work as a print specialist at Christie's in London (1994–98), she discovered Rembrandt's copperplate Abraham entertaining the Angels when examining the back of a painting on copper by Pieter Geysels. The copperplate, made by Rembrandt in 1656, was acquired at auction by the National Gallery of Art in Washington. As Director of Business Development at Sotheby's in Amsterdam, Heenk organised single-owner sales such as Treasures of a World Traveler: the Collection of Boudewijn Büch (2004), the Elephants of Prince Bernhard (2005) and the Collection of the late Frits Philips (2006). In 2009, she sat on the Scientific Committee for the Van Gogh exhibition at the Complesso del Vittoriano in Rome, while working for the Royal Household at the Royal Palace of Amsterdam. She has also sat on various committees of Dutch museums.

With her imprint Amsterdam Publishers, established in 2012, Heenk publishes books about the Holocaust. She is no longer professionally involved in the art history world.

== Publications ==
- "As Time Goes By", in: Seeing Differently. The Phillips Collects for a new Century, edited by Elsa Smithgall, Washington DC, 2021, pp. 234–236.
- Seurat, Van Gogh, Mondrian. Il Post-Impressionismo in Europa (co-editor) exhibition catalogue, Verona, Italy, 2015-2016.
- The 1-Hour Van Gogh Book, a Van Gogh Biography for Beginners [2012] (2015)
- Van Gogh's Inner Struggle: Life, Work and Mental Illness [2013] (2015)
- Van Gogh and Money. The Myth of the Poor Artist (2014)
- Jabes Heenck (1752-1782). A catalogue raisonné (in preparation)
- Howard Hodgkin: Prints. A catalogue raisonné, London (Thames & Hudson) 2005.
- Articles in Dictionary of Artists' Models, London (Fitzoy Dearborn Publishers), May 2001
- Rembrandt and his Influence on eighteenth-century German and Austrian Printmakers, exhibition catalogue Museum Het Rembrandthuis (Studies from the Rembrandt Information Centre vol. I), Amsterdam, July 1998
- "Rembrandt etchings from the Hermitage" (book review), Print Quarterly, April 1998, vol. XV, no 1
- "A Rembrandt copperplate," Print Quarterly, September 1997, vol. XIV, no. 3, pp. 313–14
- "The Discovery of an etched copperplate by Rembrandt," Kroniek van het Rambrandthuis, August 1997, no. 1-2, pp. 48–50.
- "Copperplate Rembrandt," Christie's International Magazine, June 1997, p. 71
- "Etching by Rembrandt. Reflections of the Golden Age" (book review) Print Quarterly, vol. XIV, no. 2, June 1997, p. 202
- "Van Gogh and the art market," Apollo, February 1997, vol. CXLV, no. 420, pp. 32–36.
- "An early Van Gogh drawing rediscovered," Christie's International Magazine, December 1996, p. 93.
- "Van Gogh drawings. The early years" (book review), The Burlington Magazine, August 1996, no. 1121, vol. CXXXVIII, pp. 559–650.
- "Revealing Van Gogh. An examination of his papers," The Paper Conservator, vol. 18, 1994, pp. 30–39.
- "Vincent van Gogh. The complete works on paper" (book review), The Burlington Magazine, January 1994, no. 1090, vol. CXXXVI, p. 41.
- "Vincent van Gogh: drawings" (bibliography), Rijksmuseum Kröller-Möller, Otterlo, 1990
