= Amsterdam Publishers =

Holocaust memoir publisher

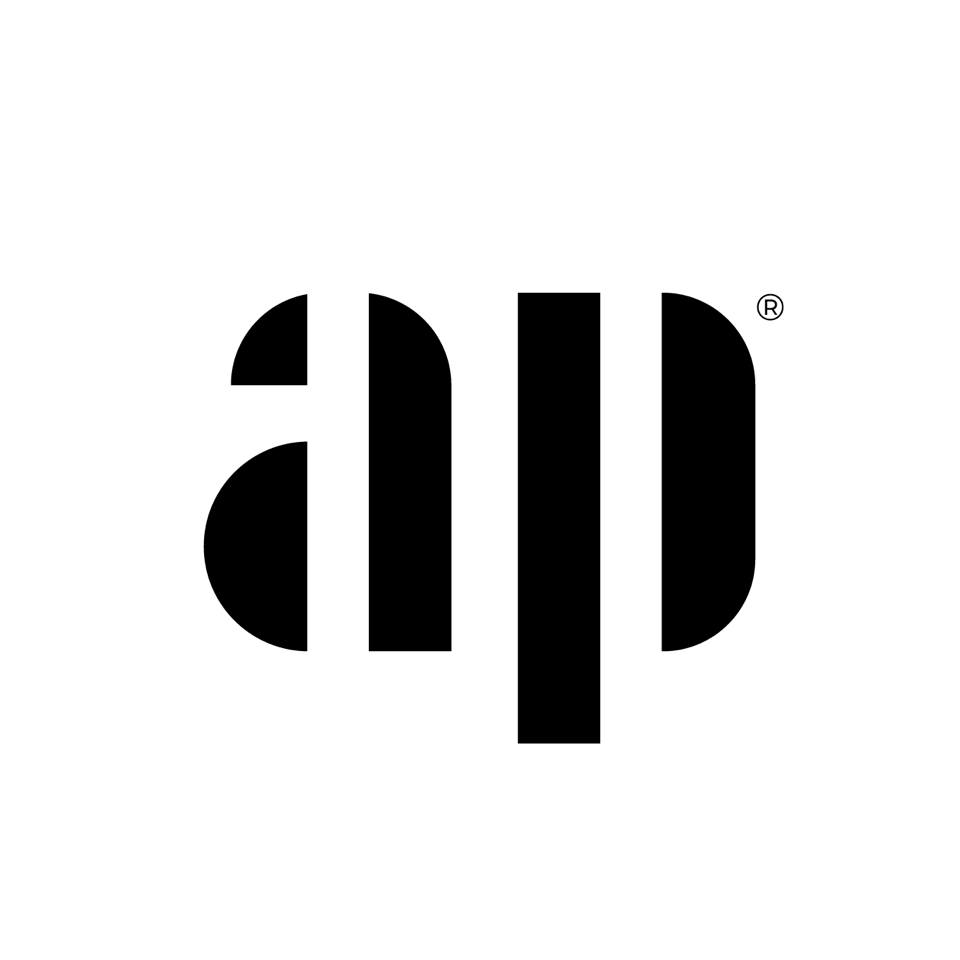
- Founded: 2012
- Founder: Liesbeth Heenk
- Country of origin: The Netherlands
- Headquarters location: Amsterdam
- Nonfiction topics: Holocaust memoirs
- Official website: amsterdampublishers.com

Amsterdam Publishers is the world's largest publisher of Holocaust Stories by Survivors, their children and their grandchildren. It was founded in 2012 by Liesbeth Heenk. Since 2019 it focuses on Holocaust-related literature. It has published 160 books to date.

== History ==
Amsterdam Publishers started publishing ebooks on art in 2012. One of its earliest releases was an ebook on Rembrandt etchings, and accompanied an exhibition on Rembrandt at the Teylers museum in Haarlem in 2013. It was the first time a digital publication accompanied an exhibition. In 2015, the imprint started running self-publishing workshops, which was later accompanied by an instructional handbook published in Dutch.

Amsterdam Publishers added their first non-art titles in 2014. Steinberg's Outcry was an early commercial success. Since 2019, the publisher has focused exclusively on Holocaust Memoirs. The founder, Liesbeth Heenk, has stated that the mission of the imprint is to counter anti-Semitism and Holocaust denial. Heenk's stable of writers includes a dwindling number of Holocaust survivors as well as second and third-generation members of survivors’ families.

Amsterdam Publishers is one of the few international publishing houses based in the Netherlands. Its authors are international (mainly from the US), and books are (being) published in English, Albanian, Czech, Dutch, Greek, Hebrew, Sinhalese, French, German, Italian, Spanish, Polish, Romanian, Slovak, Ukrainian, Russian, Chinese and Japanese.

On the occasion of the 10-year anniversary of the publishing house, the Consulate of the Kingdom of the Netherlands in New York hosted an Amsterdam Publishers authors event on 12 September 2022, and one in 2024. Since various authors were unable to attend an event in one location, the publisher decided to host a worldwide author gathering on Zoom in September 2025. In November 2022, a 7-day booktour in Albania and Kosovo took place to promote Dr Anna Kohen's Flower of Vlora in the Albanian language, Lulja e Vlorës.

At the 35th annual conference of the World Federation of Jewish Holocaust Survivors and Descendants, held in Paris from September 12 to 15, 2025, Liesbeth Heenk gave a talk and moderated a session on how to write and publish the survival stories of parents and grandparents.

At the International Conference in March 2026: Holocaust research: past, present and future at Western Galilee College in Acco (Israel) she was scheduled to give a lecture about the transformative power of personal testimony. At Beth Juliana in Herzliya this paper would also have been given. Both events have been postponed.

Amsterdam Publishers set up a private online space where authors can communicate and can support each other. Almost 100 of its authors are active in this online group.

Liesbeth Heenk on her motivation to publish stories of the Holocaust:

My motivation is connected to a sense of injustice. It most likely started with my mother telling me and my siblings at the dinner table how she, as a young girl, used to carry pamphlets in her bike for the Dutch resistance. One doesn’t realize the significance of these things until much later. On a deeper level, I feel a strong need to do something meaningful, to change the world as much as an individual is capable of changing the world.

Amsterdam Publishers has been named "2024 Publisher of the Year" by the Outstanding Creator Award. In 2025 the publishing house has released its 100th Holocaust book.

The reservoir of true Holocaust stories continues to grow. I will consider my job to be unfinished until six million stories are told. I am 62 years old now, so hopefully still have a long time to go, but I want to ensure that even after I am gone the reservoir of stories will remain and be read. This is very important to me. From: "On Publishing Holocaust Memoirs: An Interview with Liesbeth Heenk, Founder of Amsterdam Publishers, in: AJL, vol. 23 (2024), pp. 107

On 29 June 2025, coinciding with the American Librarians Association event in Philadelphia, where the publisher – assisted by eight of its authors – presented a selection of her books, the publisher was honored by the Jewish community of the city at Rodelph Shalom. The publishers' presence at the event caught the attention of various journalists.

Jonathan Schloss in The Algemeiner of 28 November 2025: "I published with a boutique publisher run by a non-Jewish agnostic woman with a deeply grounded and passionate moral compass. Liesbeth Heenk’s Amsterdam Publishers has published over 100 Holocaust-related books written by survivors and second-generation and third-generation authors from all religious backgrounds. I’d argue that she is not “fighting” anything. Rather, she proactively encourages vigilance against society breaking down due to irrational hate through true cautionary, inspirational stories."

In April 2026, Amsterdam Publishers was featured in an article in The Times of Israel examining trends in Holocaust memoir publishing and changing patterns in readership.

== Bibliography ==
Holocaust Library

Amsterdam Publishers specialises in memoirs by Holocaust survivors, Second Generation survivors and Third Generation survivors. These include memoirs by Joseph Schupack, Janina Altman, Hank Brodt, Nanette Blitz Konig, Natalie Hess, Walter Leopold, Professor Paul Davidovits, Dr. Robert Krell, Leon Kleiner, Halina Kleiner, Henry Reiss, Sara Lustigman Omelinksi, Jan Yohay Remetz, Roman Halter, Andrew Laszlo, Leokadia Schmidt, Rudi Haymann, Wolf Holles, Benjamin Parket, Valentina Freimane, Iboja Wandall-Holm, Ignacy Chiger, Dr. Yakov Adler, and Luba Wrobel Goldberg. Their memoirs are part of the series Holocaust Survivor Memoirs WWII. Many of these survivors can be found on this List of Holocaust survivors.

In addition to survivor testimonies, Amsterdam Publishers publishes works by second- and third-generation authors in the series Holocaust Survivor True Stories and Holocaust Heritage, which focus on the intergenerational impact of the Holocaust.

The series Jewish Children in the Holocaust comprises testimonies written by Holocaust survivors who were hidden as children in the Netherlands and Belgium during the Second World War. Contributors to this series include Dr. Robert Krell, Joseph Gosler, and Agnes Schipper.

In 2021, Amsterdam Publishers expanded its catalogue with the introduction of the New Jewish Fiction series. In 2022, the publisher added the Holocaust Books for Young Adults series, which includes Running for Shelter by Suzette Sheft (born 2006), a work based on the true story of her grandmother.

On a regular basis, foreign translations are being published, among others in German, French, Spanish, Italian, Polish and Ukrainian. None of these appear in the list below.

Amsterdam Publishers will be introducing a new series of Kindertransport memoirs im early 2027, focusing on firsthand survivor accounts of Jewish children rescued from Nazi-controlled Europe.

In addition to Holocaust-related works, Amsterdam Publishers has published the memoirs of Omar Ndizeye and Hyppolite Ntigurirwa, which document their experiences during the Rwandan genocide. This line of publication was later discontinued in order to concentrate exclusively on Holocaust literature and Jewish history.

Title	Author	Released	ISBN
The War Never Ended	Simon Hammelburg	May 2014	discontinued
Outcry: Holocaust Memoirs	Manny Steinberg	September 2014	discontinued
The Mission of Abbé Glasberg	Lucien Lazare	March 2016	1522840958
The Dead Years: Holocaust Memoirs	Joseph Schupack	February 2017	9789493056343
Hank Brodt Holocaust Memoirs: A Candle and a Promise	Deborah Donnelly	April 2017	9789492371218
Among the Reeds: The true story of how a family survived the Holocaust	Tammy Bottner	June 2017	9789492371287
See You Tonight and Promise to Be a Good Boy!: War memories	Salo Muller	November 2017	9789492371553
A Quiet Genocide	Glenn Bryant	August 2018	9789492371829
A Holocaust Memoir of Love & Resilience: Mama's Survival from Lithuania to America	Ettie Zilber	January 2019	9789493056022
Holocaust Memoirs of a Bergen-Belsen Survivor & Classmate of Anne Frank	Nanette Blitz Konig	January 2019	9789492371614
Rescued from the Ashes: The Diary of Leokadia Schmidt, Survivor of the Warsaw Ghetto	Leokadia Schmidt	January 2019	9789493056060
Mendelevski's Box	Roger Swindells	February 2019	9789493056107
The Knife-Edge Path	Patrick T. Leahy	December 2019	9789493056329
Remembering Ravensbrück: From Holocaust to Healing	Natalie Hess	January 2020	9789493056237
My Lvov: Account of the Holocaust in Lvov by a twelve-year-old girl	Janina Hescheles	January 2020	9789493056367
Living Among the Dead: My Grandmother's Holocaust Survival Story of Love and Strength	Adena Bernstein Astrowsky	March 2020	9789493056374
Searching for Home: The Impact of WWII on a Hidden Child	Joseph Gosler	May 2020	9789493056343
Wolf: A Story of Hate	Zeev Scheinwald	May 2020	9789493056435
Save my Children: An Astonishing Tale of Survival and its Unlikely Hero	Leon Kleiner	May 2020	9493056511
Heart Songs: A Holocaust Memoir	Barbara Gilford	August 2020	9493056538
Shoes of the Shoah: The Tomorrow of Yesterday	Dorothy Pierce	August 2020	9493056775
Defiant German, Defiant Jew: A Holocaust Memoir from inside the Third Reich	Walter Leopold	August 2020	9493056554
Hidden in Berlin: A Holocaust Memoir	Evelyn Joseph Grossman	December 2020	9493056791
The Man Across the River: The incredible story of one man's will to survive the Holocaust	Zvi Wiesenfeld	January 2021	9493231062
Separated Together: The Incredible True WWII Story of Soulmates Stranded an Ocean Apart	Kenneth P. Price	January 2021	978949321085
The Story Keeper: Weaving the Threads of Time and Memory. A Memoir	Fred Feldman	January 2021	9493231038
If Anyone Calls, Tell Them I Died: A Memoir	Emanuel (Manu) Rosen	March 2021	9493231135
The House on Thrömerstrasse: A Story of Rebirth and Renewal in the Wake of the Holocaust	Ron Vincent	March 2021	97894993231306
Dancing with my Father: His hidden past. Her quest for truth. How Nazi Vienna shaped a family’s identity	Jo Sorochinsky	April 2021	9789493231191
Krisia’s Silence. The Girl who was not on Schindler’s List	Ronny Hein	April 2021	9789493231382
Defying Death on the Danube. A Holocaust Survival Story	Debbie J. Callahan with Henry Stern	April 2021	9789493231412
In a Land of Forest and Darkness. The Holocaust Story of two Jewish Partisans	Sara Lustigman Omelinski	June 2021	9789493231337
Sounds from Silence. Reflections of a Child Holocaust Survivor, Psychiatrist and Teacher	Robert Krell	August 2021	9789493231467
A Doorway to Heroism. A decorated German-Jewish Soldier who became an American Hero	W. Jack Romberg	September 2021	9789493231498
The Shoemaker’s Son. The Life of a Holocaust Resister	Laura Beth Bakst	October 2021	9789493231641
Holocaust Memories. Annihilation and Survival in Slovakia	Paul Davidovits	October 2021	9789493231528
The Redhead of Auschwitz. A True Story	Nechama Birnbaum	November 2021	9789493231795
From Auschwitz with Love. The Inspiring Memoir of Two Sisters’ Survival, Devotion and Triumph as told by Manci Grunberger Beran & Ruth Grunberger Mermelstein	Daniel Seymour	January 2022	9789493231887
Remetz. Resistance Fighter and Survivor of the Warsaw Ghetto	Jan Yohay Remetz	January 2022	9789493276024
When the Music Stopped. Willy Rosen's Holocaust	Casey J. Hayes	January 2022	9789493276079
Land of Many Bridges. My father’s story	Bela Ruth Samuel Tenenholtz	February 2022	9789493231986
Hands of Gold. One Man’s Quest To Find The Silver Lining In Misfortune	Roni Robbins	February 2022	9789493276109
The Corsetmaker. A Novel	Annette Libeskind Berkovits	March 2022	9789493231917
On Sunny Days We Sang: A Holocaust Story of Survival and Resilience	Jeannette Grunhaus de Gelman	March 2022	9789493276185
I Give You My Heart. A True Story of Courage and Survival	Wendy Holden	April 2022	9789493231719
Creating Beauty from the Abyss. The Amazing Story of Sam Herciger, Auschwitz Survivor and Artist	Lesley Richardson	April 2022	9789493276109
Painful Joy. A Holocaust Family Memoir	Max J. Friedman	April 2022	9789493231825
We Shall Not Shatter. A WWII Story of friendship, family, and hope against all odds	Elaine Stock	May 2022	9789493231764
Sabine’s Odyssey. A Hidden Child and her Dutch Rescuers	Agnes Schipper	May 2022	9789493231948
In the Time of Madmen	Mark A. Prelas	June 2022	9789493276154
Monsters and Miracles. Horror, Heroes and the Holocaust	Ira Wesley Kitmacher	June 2022	9789493276215
My March Through Hell. A Young Girl’s Terrifying Journey to Survival	Halina Kleiner with Edwin Stepp	June 2022	9789493276284
The Boy Behind the Door. How Salomon Kool Escaped the Nazis. Inspired by a True Story	David Tabatsky	September 2022	9789493276314
Our Daughters' last Hope	Elaine Stock	September 2022	9789493276420
There was a garden in Nuremberg. A Novel	Navina Michal Clemerson	September 2022	9789493231542
Flower of Vlore. Growing up Jewish in Communist Albania	Anna Kohen	September 2022	9789493276246
Aftermath. Coming-of-Age on Three Continents. A Memoir	Annette Libeskind Berkovits	September 2022	9789493276390
The Girl who counted Numbers. A Novel	Roslyn Bernstein	October 2022	9789493276369
Zaidy's War. Four Armies, Three Continents, Two Brothers. One Man’s Impossible Story of Endurance	Martin Bodek	October 2022	9789493276451
Not a Real Enemy. The True Story of a Hungarian Jewish Man's Fight for Freedom	Robert Wolf	October 2022	9789493276727
Running for Shelter. A True Story	Suzette Sheft	November 2022	9789493276505
The Journey of a Hidden Child	Harry Pila with Robin Black	November 2022	9789493276543
The Glassmaker’s Son. Looking for the World my Father left behind in Nazi Germany	Peter Kupfer	November 2022	9789493276468
Brave Face. The Inspiring WWII Memoir of a Dutch/German Child	Caroline Crocker	November 2022	9789493276659
The Butterfly and the Axe	Omer Bartov	January 2023	9789493276697
The Apprentice of Buchenwald. The True Story of the Teenage Boy Who Sabotaged Hitler’s War Machine	Oren Schneider	January 2023	9789493276529
When We Had Wings. The World's First Democratic Orphanage: A Historical Novel	Tami Shem-Tov	February 2023	9789493276758
The Fire and the Bonfire. A Journey into Memory	Ardyn Halter	March 2023	9789493276833
Roman's Journey	Roman Halter	March 2023	9789493276864
To Live Another Day. A novel	Elizabeth Rosenberg	March 2023	9789493322042
The Cello Still Sings - A Generational Story of the Holocaust and of the Transformative Power of Music	Janet Horvath	March 2023	9789493276802
The Precious Few: An Inspirational Saga of Courage Based on True Stories	David Twain with Art Twain	April 2023	9789493322011
A Worthy Life	Dahlia Moore	April 2023	9789493322165
Good for a Single Journey	Helen Joyce	May 2023	9789493276611
When We Disappeared	Elaine Stock	May 2023	9789493276574
Jacob's Courage. A Holocaust Love Story	Charles S. Weinblatt	June 2023	9789493276925
The Silk Factory - Finding Threads of My Family's True Holocaust Story	Michael Hickins	June 2023	9789493276895
Dutch Defense. A True Story of Struggle and Survival during World War II	Johanna Kinney	June 2023	9789493322073
Beyond Borders. Escaping the Holocaust and Fighting the Nazis. 1938 - 1948	Rudi Haymann	August 2023	9789493322226
Burying the Ghosts. She escaped Nazi Germany only to have her life torn apart by the woman she saved from the camps: her mother	Sonia Case	September 2023	9789493322103
Bipolar Refugee. A Saga of Survival and Resilience	Peter Wiesner	September 2023	9789493276956
American Wolf. From Nazi refugee to American Spy. A true story	Audrey Birnbaum	October 2023	9789493276987
The Engineers. A memoir of survival through World War II in Poland and Hungary	Henry Reiss	January 2024	9789493322363
In the Wake of Madness. My Family’s Escape from the Nazis	Bettie Lennett Denny	February 2024	9789493322349
Before the Beginning and After the End	Hymie Anisman	February 2024	9789493322240
I Will Give Them an Everlasting Name. Jacksonville's Stories of the Holocaust	Samuel P. Cox	May 2024	9789493322530
A Semblance of Justice. Based on true Holocaust experiences	Wolf Holles	May 2024	9789493322639
The Right to Happiness. After all they went through. Stories	Helen Schary Motro	June 2024	9789493322660
Hiding in Holland. A Resistance Memoir	Shulamit Reinharz	June 2024	9789493322707
Winter Light: The Memoir of a Child of Holocaust Survivors, by Grace Feuerverger	Grace Feuerverger	September 2024	9789493322608
Out from the Shadows. Growing up with Holocaust Survivor Parents	Willie Handler	November 2024	9789493322882
The Ghosts on the Wall. A Grandson’s Memoir of the Holocaust	Kenneth D. Wald	November 2024	9789493322820
Footnote to History. From Hungary to America. The Memoir of a Holocaust Survivor	Andrew Laszlo	January 2025	9789493322851
Dark Shadows Hover	Jordan Steven Sher	January 2025	9789493322912
Thirteen in Auschwitz. My Grandmother's Fight to Survive	Lauren Meyerowitz Port	March 2025	9789493418134
Farewell Atlantis. Recollections	Valentīna Freimane	March 2025	9789493418226
Five Amber Beads	Richard Aronowitz	March 2025	9789493418196
Hidden in Plain Sight. A Family Memoir and the Untold Story of the Holocaust in Serbia	Julie Brill	April 2025	9789493418059
The Unspeakable. Breaking my family’s silence surrounding the Holocaust	Nicola Hanefeld	April 2025	9789493322943
To Love Another day. A Novel	Elizabeth Rosenberg	May 2025	9789493418103
The Courtyard. A memoir	Ben Parket and Alexa Morris	June 2025	9789493418004
The Boy in the Back. A True Story of Survival in Auschwitz and Mauthausen	Fern Lebo	June 2025	9789493418356
Eighteen for Life. Surviving the Holocaust	Helen Schamroth	July 2025	9789493418257
The Sun will Shine Again	Cynthia Monsour	July 2025	9789493418394
Four Survivor Grandparents. Run. Rely. Rebuild	Jonathan Schloss	July 2025	9789493418448
The Mulberry Tree. The story of a life before and after the Holocaust	Iboja Wandall-Holm	July 2025	9789493418288
Under the Pink Triangle. Where forbidden love meets unspeakable evil	Katie Moore	September 2025	9789493418080
Austrian Again. Reclaiming a Lost Legacy	Anne Hand	October 2025	9789493322974
The Jewish Woman Who Fought the Nazis. Bep Schaap-Bedak’s life during the Holocaust in Holland	Eli Schaap	October 2025	9789493418479
Cursing the Darkness. A Novel about Loss and Recovery	Joanna Rosenthall	November 2025	9789493418165
Beneath the Lightless Sky. Surviving the Holocaust in the Sewers of Lvov	Ignacy Chiger	January 2026	9789493418578
Little Edna's War. A True story of Resistance and Hope. A Gripping WWII page-turner	Janet Bond Brill PhD	January 2026	9789493418639
From Sorrow to Joy. From Hitler's Darkness to the Sunlight on Mount Carmel	Dr. Yakov Ader	February 2026	9789493418783
Was it Just a Matter of Luck? A Family, the Holocaust, and the Founding of a Museum	Dr. Charles Kaner & Joy E. Stocke	March 2026	9789493418752
Dreaming of the River. A Mother and Daughter’s Fight for Survival during the Holocaust	Pauline Steinhorn	April 2026	9789493418844
From One Generation to the Next: Unbroken Resilience	Hymie Anisman	April 2026	9789493418943
Voices of Resilience. An Anthology of Stories, written by Children of Holocaust Survivors	Deborah Ross	May 2026	9789493418608
Divine Corners. In the Shadow of the Holocaust on a Catskills Chicken Farm	Michelle Friedman	May 2026	9789493418707
The Memory Place. How My Parents Survived Nazi Hell	Monica van Rijn	May 2026	9789493418547
Never Fitting In. My Journey with Parental Trauma, Addiction, Healing	Sonia Claire Ascher	May 2026	9789493418967
Irmgard. The Girl from Dresden. A Memoir of Survival and Legacy	Fional Kelmann	July 2026	9789493541047
Memories of a Sub-Human. A Jewish Teenager’s Journey of Survival. From Riga to Buchenwald and Back	Aleksandr Bergman	July 2026	9789493541016
Milk in an Eggshell. A WWII story of hiding in plain sight	Miryam Sas	August 2026	9789493541078
The World has Caught Fire. One Jewish Family's Attempt to Survive Nazi Poland	Leah Grisham PhD	September 2026	9789493541177
90 Charles Street. Girlhood in an immigrant Jewish family in Greenwich Village	Jennifer Landau-Carter	October 2026	9789493541108
From Time to Time. A Jewish Family's Journey through a Century of Upheaval	Helen Joyce	November 2026	9789493541207
The Kapos of Auschwitz. A Memoir of Human Nature under Totalitarianism	Charles Liblau	January 2027	9789493541238
The Shoemaker of Treblinka. A Son’s Discovery and Quest for Meaning	Sharon Citrin Goldstein and Paul Goldstein	January 2027	9789493541153
An Impossible Promise. A Love Story	Michael Kopiec	January 2027	9789493541368
Fighting Back. One Boy’s Journey from the Kindertransport to the Front Lines	Ernest J. Goodman	February 2026	9789493541443
The Straight Between Us	Liv Maadele Mogensen	February 2027	
Out of the Woods. A Holocaust Memoir	Aliza Levy Erber	March 2027	9789493541399
Mendel, Run! The Extraordinary True Story of a Jewish Boy's Survival in Nazi-Occupied Poland	Milton H/ Schwartz with Marlene Goldstein	April 2027	9789493418509
Letters Across Time. A Granddaughter Writes Back to Her Grandmother Lost in Auschwitz	Emily Sekler Breese	May 2027	9789493541337
Crossings. Separated by War, Reunited by Love	Betty Steinberg	May 2027	9789493541429
The Price of Bread. The Unwanted Inheritance of Silence	Em Lewin	May 2027	
Only for a Short Time	Siska Topaz-Melkman	June 2027	
Born to be His Son. A Holocaust Survivor's Legacy and his son's search for purpose	Henry Weinreich	September 2027	
Seven Brothers. My Jewish Heritage, lost and found	Chris Olley	October 2027	
The Liwers. Grandpa, a Forgotten Consul, and me	Arlette Liwer	October 2027	
The Seventh Step. Lessons From a Dutch Holocaust Survivor	Careen Shannon	November 2027	
