= Nanette Blitz Konig =

Concentration camp survivor and classmate of Anne Frank (born 1929)

- Born: Nanette Blitz; 6 April 1929 (age 97); Amsterdam, The Netherlands
- Occupations: Author, public speaker
- Spouse: John Frederick Konig (m. 1953; died 2022)
- Children: 3

Nanette Blitz Konig (born 6 April 1929) is a Dutch survivor of Bergen-Belsen concentration camp and former classmate of Anne Frank in Amsterdam. She has lived in São Paulo, Brazil since 1953. In 2015, she published a book about being a Belsen survivor called Eu Sobrevivi ao Holocausto. On Holocaust Memorial Day 26 January 2018, Nanette's book was published in English with the title Holocaust Memoirs of a Bergen-Belsen Survivor & Classmate of Anne Frank.

== Biography ==
Blitz was born on 6 April 1929 in Amsterdam, to Martijn Willem Blitz, a worker at the Amsterdam Bank, and Helene Victoria Davids, who were of Jewish origin. She had an older brother, Bernard Martijn, born in 1927, and a younger brother, Willem, who was born in 1932 with a "blue baby" heart defect and died in 1936. The Nazis occupied the Netherlands in May 1940, and at the beginning of 1941, Jewish students were assigned to Jewish-designated schools; it was then that Nanette became a classmate of Anne Frank.

The Blitz family was arrested and taken to the Westerbork transit camp in September 1943. On 15 February 1944, they were deported to the Bergen-Belsen concentration camp.

Martijn died in late November 1944. At the beginning of December 1944, Bernard and Helene were deported from Bergen-Belsen and Nanette remained alone. Bernard died in the Oranienburg concentration camp, while Helene was deported to the Beendorf salt mines as a slave labourer; she died in April 1945 on a train en route to Sweden.

In January 1945, Nanette was transferred to a part of Bergen-Belsen known as the "small women’s camp". From there, she saw Anne Frank in a "large field of women" through the barbed wired fence. These two camps become one section and it was then that Nanette was reunited with Anne and her sister Margot.

I was all alone in the camp, so being reunited with someone I knew was something that made me unforgettably emotional, because love and friendship were our only means of hope amid chaos. One day, as I was walking outside the barrack area, I got closer to the barbed-wire fence that prevented me from having access to other parts of the camp. On the other side of the fence, I saw a face that looked familiar. It was Anne Frank! Anne looked as frail as I did. I still had my hair, but hers had been shaved. I only caught a glimpse of her, since we were in different camps and I could not get any closer. However, that was enough to motivate me, to want to see her and talk to her. We would certainly have a lot to share.

— Nanette Blitz Konig, Holocaust Memoirs of a Bergen-Belsen Survivor & Classmate of Anne Frank

Nanette survived Bergen-Belsen and was rescued by the British Major Leonard Berney. After the war, she spent three years in hospital due to typhus, the disease which killed Margot and Anne Frank. During this period, Anne's father visited her to ask about his daughters. Later, Otto Frank gave Nanette the diary written by his daughter Anne, Het Achterhuis (The Secret Annex). After Nanette had recovered, she went to live in England where she met her future husband, John Konig, who was of Hungarian origin. In 1953, they married and moved to Brazil. Nanette gave lectures about the Holocaust and her life.

In 2018, her memoir Holocaust Memoirs of a Bergen-Belsen Survivor & Classmate of Anne Frank, a detailed account of her experiences during World War II, was published by Amsterdam Publishers. The book won the Readers' Favorite Gold Medal Award in 2019.

Following the death of Jacqueline van Maarsen in February 2025 and Eva Schloss in January 2026, she is one of the last living people to have known Anne Frank. She is also the last living person who saw Frank closest to her death.

== Bibliography ==
- Blitz Konig, Nanette (2018). Holocaust Memoirs of a Bergen-Belsen Survivor & Classmate of Anne Frank. Amsterdam Publishers. ISBN 9789492371614.
