= Marian Hemar =

Polish poet, journalist, playwright, comedy writer and songwriter

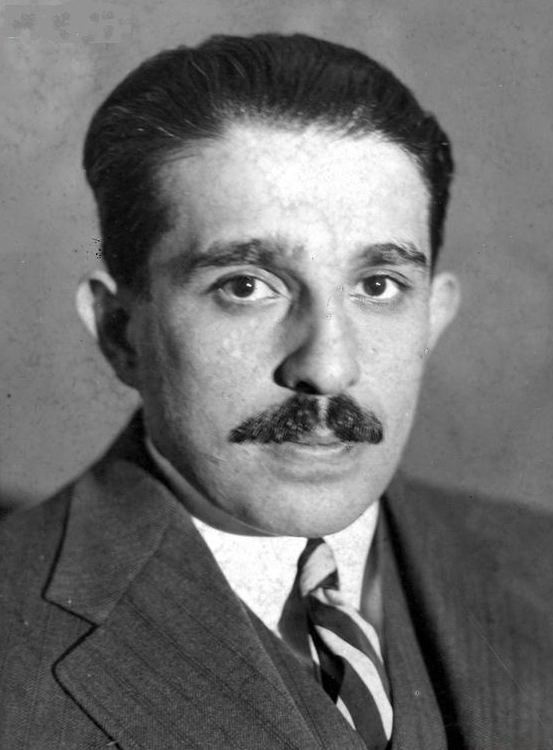
- Born: Marian Hescheles; 6 April 1901; Lemberg, Kingdom of Galicia and Lodomeria, Austria-Hungary
- Died: 11 February 1972 (aged 70); Dorking, Surrey, England, United Kingdom
- Occupation: Writer
- Writing career
- Language: Polish

Marian Hemar (1901–1972), born Marian Hescheles (other pen names: Jan Mariański, and Marian Wallenrod), was a Polish poet, journalist, playwright, comedy writer, and songwriter. Hemar himself stated that before the outbreak of World War II he had already written 1,200 songs, including such widely popular hits as Może kiedyś innym razem (Maybe Some Other Time) and Upić się warto (Let's get drunk). Hemar was a final pen name adopted by Marian in his literary career. It was formed from the first two letters of his last name, Hescheles, and the first three letters of his given name, Marian.

== Life ==
Marian Hemar was born to a Jewish family on 6 April 1901 in Lemberg. He studied medicine and philosophy at the Jan Kazimierz University locally, and took part in the Defense of Lwów in 1918 and 1919 as a volunteer on the Polish side of the Polish–Ukrainian War of independence. At the invitation of Jerzy Boczkowski, director of the legendary Qui Pro Quo Theatre, he left for Warsaw in 1924. By 1925 he was already a well-known personality in the arts community of Warsaw, working at the Qui Pro Quo cabaret with Julian Tuwim. He was a key figure in the productions of Banda, Morskie Oko, and Cyrulik Warszawski (Barber of Warsaw) cabarets; as well as the author of hundreds of Polish Radio sketches. He wrote shmontses (szmonces) – Jewish jokes, monologues and sketches – and jointly composed political sketches with poets Julian Tuwim and Antoni Słonimski.

His unhappy love affair with the Warsaw diseuse Maria Modzelewska inspired many of his songs including Chciałabym, a boję się (transl. Happy Days Are Here Again, aka I'd Love To Do It, but I'm Afraid)

Soon after the outbreak of World War II Hemar fled Warsaw after being searched for by the Gestapo and reached Romania, and eventually the Middle East, where he signed up and served in the Polish Independent Carpathian Rifle Brigade. During the war he continued his literary activity, organizing concerts, speeches and field theater plays for Polish troops. He also organized one of the few theaters operating in besieged Tobruk.

He was called "The bard of Lvov, the troubadour of the London emigration". For 16 years (1953–1969) he prepared and presented weekly cabaret programmes for Radio Free Europe, in which – in prose and verse – he commented upon all the important news from post-war Poland. — Polish Art Center

After the war, Hemar was unable to return to communist Poland due to the persecution by the Polish authorities of all persons who were politically active. In 1939, he left for Palestine but settled in England in 1941, becoming one of the best-known figures in the Polish diaspora. He continued to be popular in Poland with his weekly program broadcast by the Polish section of the Radio Free Europe.

Hemar died on 11 February 1972, aged 70, in Dorking, Surrey. He is buried in the graveyard of Christ Church, Coldharbour, Surrey, alongside his wife, Caja (1910–1982). There are plans to move his remains to Poland. Hemar's mother was the sister of Stanisław Lem's father. Hemar's niece was Polish-Israeli chemist Janina Altman.

== Notable works ==
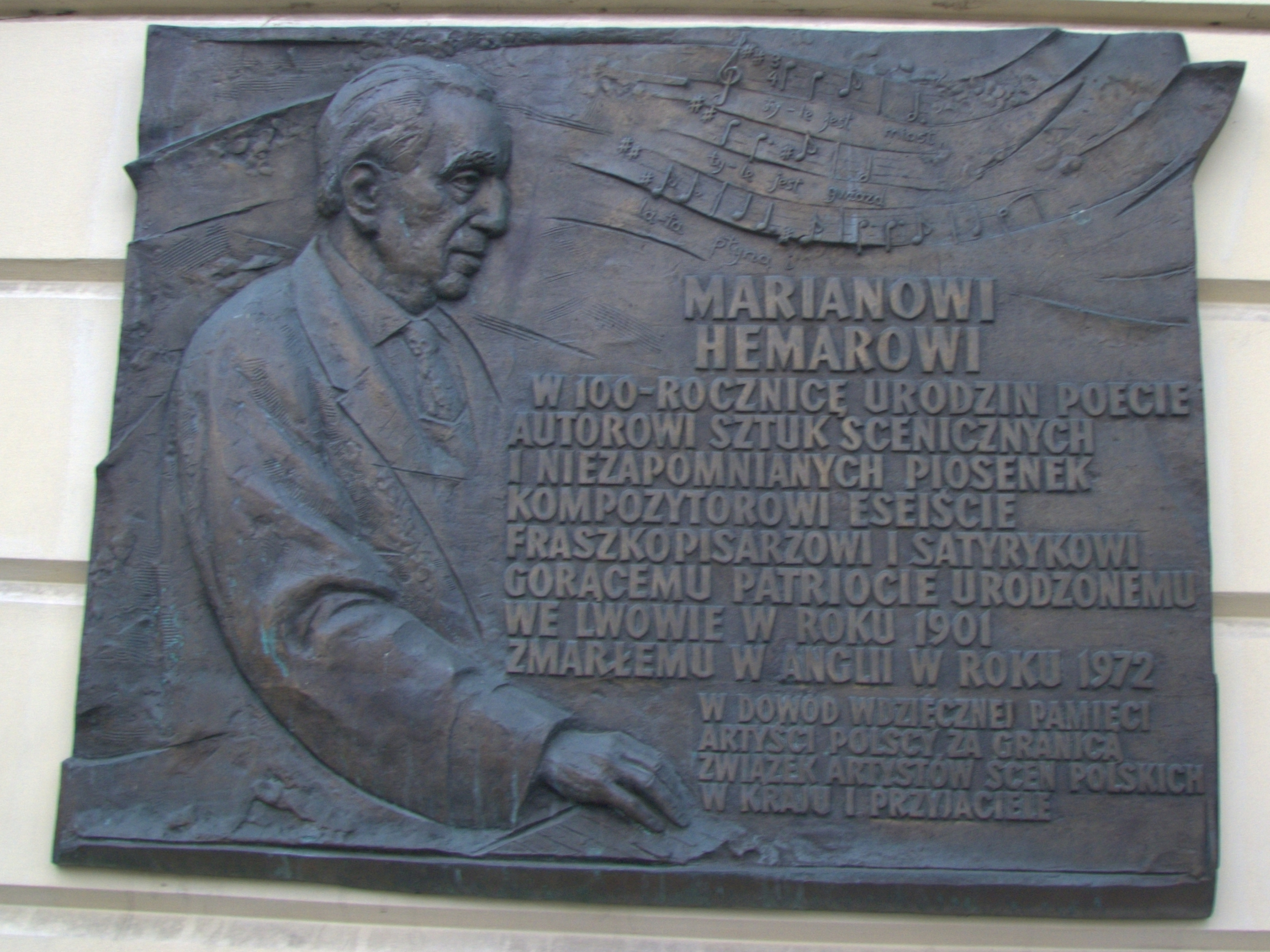
Memorial plaque in Warsaw

Collections of poems

- Koń trojański (Trojan Horse; 1936)
- Dwie ziemie święte (Two Holy Lands; 1942)
- Siedem lat chudych (Seven Lean Years; 1955)
- Ściana płaczu (Wailing Wall; 1968)

Comedies

- Dwaj panowie B. (Two Mr. B's; 1929)
- Firma (The company; 1933)

Feuilletons

- Awantury w rodzinie (Family Feuds; 1967)
- Świstki z podróży (Scraps from a Journey; 1964).
