= Hanwant Singh =

Last ruling Maharaja of Jodhpur (1923–1952)

- Maharaja of Marwar
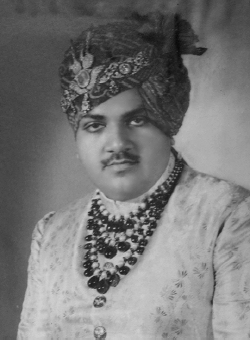
- Hanwant Singh, 1947–49

Maharaja of Jodhpur
- Tenure: 9 January 1947–1949
- Predecessor: Umaid Singh
- Successor: Gaj Singh II
- Born: 16 June 1923; Jodhpur, Jodhpur State, British India (present-day Rajasthan, India)
- Died: 26 January 1952 (aged 28); Sumerpur, Rajasthan, India
- Spouse: Princess Krishna Kumari of Dhrangadhra (m. 1943 - 1952; his death); Zubeida Begum (m. 1950 - 1952; their deaths)
- Issue: Chandreshwari Kumari, Crown Princess of Lambagraon; Princess Shailesh Kumari; Gaj Singh, Crown Prince of Marwar; Prince Hukum Singh
- House: Rathore
- Father: Umaid Singh I of Marwar
- Mother: Princess Badan Kanwar Osiyan
- Religion: Hinduism

Hanwant Singh of Marwar (16 June 1923 – 26 January 1952) was the last ruler of the third largest Indian Kingdom of Marwar. He succeeded his father as the Maharaja of Jodhpur of the Rathore dynasty of Marwar on 9 June 1947 and held the title till his death at age 28 in a plane crash on 26 January 1952.

== Family life ==
In 1943 he married Princess Krishna Kumari of Dhrangadhra, they had three children, the youngest child, a son Gaj Singh Rathore; who succeeded him, daughter Sailesh Kumari married in Banswara; and daughter, Chandresh Kumari Katoch of Kangra. In 1948, he met 19-year-old Scottish nurse Sandra McBryde, with whom he had a tempestuous and brief affair. Later he married the Muslim actress Zubeida who converted to Hinduism as Vidya Rani, by whom he had a son named Hukum Singh Rathore (Tutu Bana). Soon after their marriage he received rebuke from the royal family and as a result he started to live in Mehrangarh. From her first marriage, Zubeida had a son, Khalid Mohammed, a film critic and director.

After their death, their son Tutu was brought up by Rajmata Krishna Kumari, and later went to study at Mayo College in Ajmer. He married Rao Rani Rajeshwari Kumari Rathore, daughter of Rao Raja Daljit Singh of Alwar. The couple had one son, Parikshit Singh Rathore (b. 1974) and one daughter, Jainandini Kanwar (b. 1975). However, on 17 April 1981, he was beheaded and found on the streets of Jodhpur.

== Final years ==
After Indian independence and formation of Rajasthan as a state within India, he formed a new political party, Akhil Bhartiya Ramrajya Parishad in 1952. Campaigning in both the Indian general and state Assembly elections scheduled for February 1952, Hanwant Singh would have won a majority in his region. After only four hours of sleep he took off in a small aircraft with his wife, Zubeida on 26 January 1952. The plane crashed near Sumerpur, killing him at the age of 28. Zubeida also perished in the accident.

In 2011, wreckage of the aircraft, Beechcraft Bonanza, a light six-seater aircraft, was discovered inside Jodhpur Central Jail. Subsequently, in 2012, the Mehrangarh Fort Museum founded in 1972 by Maharaja Gaj Singh, formally asked the jail to transfer the wreckage to the museum.

== See also ==
- Rulers of Marwar
