= Krishna Kumari (regent) =

Indian politician (1926–2018)

Member of Parliament, Lok Sabha
- In office 1971 - 1977
- Preceded by: N K Sanghi
- Succeeded by: R D Gattani
- Constituency: Jodhpur

Personal details
- Born: 10 February 1926
- Died: 3 July 2018 (aged 92) Jodhpur
- Spouse: Maharaja Hanuwant Singh
- Children: Gaj Singh II; Chandresh Kumari Katoch; Shailesh Kumari

Rajmata Krishna Kumari (10 February 1926 – 3 July 2018) was an Indian politician. She was the Maharani consort of Marwar-Jodhpur as the spouse of Maharaja Hanuwant Singh, and the titular regent of Marwar-Jodhpur during the minority of Gaj Singh II in 1952-1970. She was a Member of Parliament, Lok Sabha, in 1971-1977.

== Life ==
Krishna Kumari was born on 10 February 1926 to Ghanshyamsinhji Ajitsinhji as the princess of Dhrangadhra State. She was educated by British governesses at the palace school along with her brothers and cousins.

She was the last Maharani consort of Marwar-Jodhpur in 1947–1949 as the spouse of Maharaja Hanuwant Singh.

== Political life ==
She contested the 1971 Indian general election for the Jodhpur Lok Sabha constituency and won, serving until 1977.

== Death ==
She died on 3 July 2018, in Jodhpur, aged 92.
