= Sultan Palace (Patna) =

Elaborate house in Patna, India

- Part of Bihar
- Veer Chand Patel Marg Patna

Site information
- Controlled by: Bihar State tourism Development corporation
- Condition: Ruins

The Sultan Palace was the home of eminent lawyer and judge Sir Sultan Ahmad. It is situated at Veer Chand Patel Marg in Patna.

== History ==
It was built for Sir Sultan Ahmad, an Advocate and judge in Patna high court, in 1922.

== Architecture ==
It was built on a 10-acre parcel. It took two years to complete with an outlay of 3 lakh. It was designed by Ali Jaan. White marble is widespread. It was built in Islamic style with a high, domed tower in the center, domed pavilions at the corners, minarets and multi-foliated arches in the facade. The palace is divided into two parts: the front is for males and the rear for females. The most important portion is the drawing room in the front with a fireplace, moulding and an ornamental ceiling painted with gold powder.

== Location ==
It is 2–3 km from Patna Junction, 4–5 km from Patna Airport, 5–6 km from Mithapur bus stand.

== See also ==
- Golghar
- Patna Museum
- Rizwan Castle
