= Umaid Bhawan Palace =

Palace in Jodhpur, India

Coordinates: 26°16′51″N 73°02′49″E

Umaid Bhawan Palace, Jodhpur
- उम्मैद भवन पैलेस
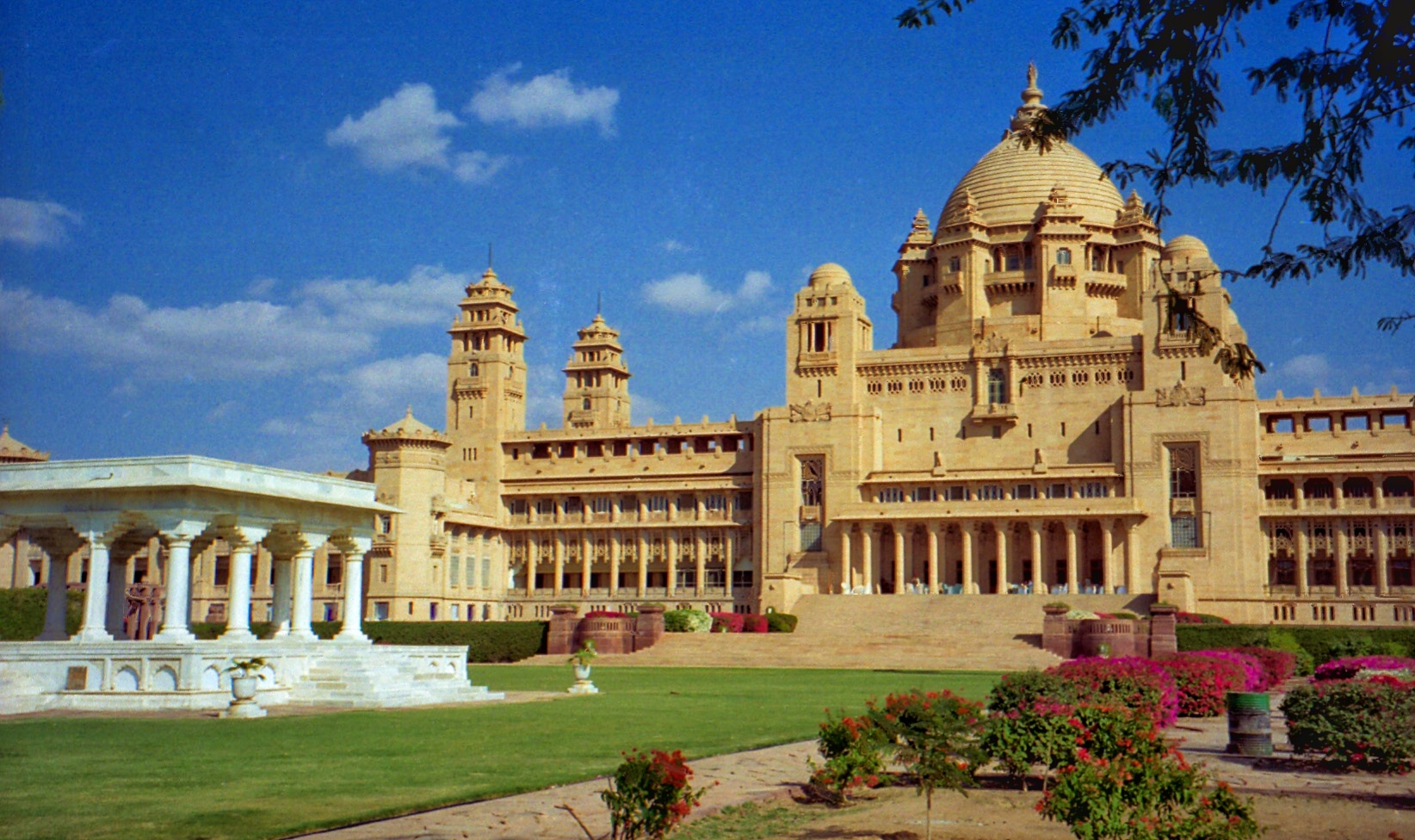
- Front façade of the Umaid Bhawan Palace

General information
- Architectural style: Indo-Saracenic Architecture, Beaux-Arts architecture
- Location: Jodhpur, Rajasthan, India
- Construction started: 18 Nov,1929
- Completed: 1943; 83 years ago
- Owner: Gaj Singh

Technical details
- Structural system: Golden yellow or dun-coloured sandstone

Design and construction
- Architects: Henry Lanchester and Sir Samuel Swinton Jacob
- Engineer: Henry Vaughan Lanchester

Umaid Bhawan Palace (Hindi: उम्मैद भवन पैलेस), located in Jodhpur, Rajasthan, India, is one of the world's largest private residences. A part of the palace is managed by Taj Hotels. It is named after Maharaja Umaid Singh, grandfather of the present owner, Gaj Singh. The palace has 347 rooms and is the principal residence of the former Jodhpur royal family. A part of the palace is a museum.

The groundbreaking for the foundations of the building was carried out on 18 November 1929 by Maharaja Umaid Singh and the construction work was completed in 1943.

== History ==
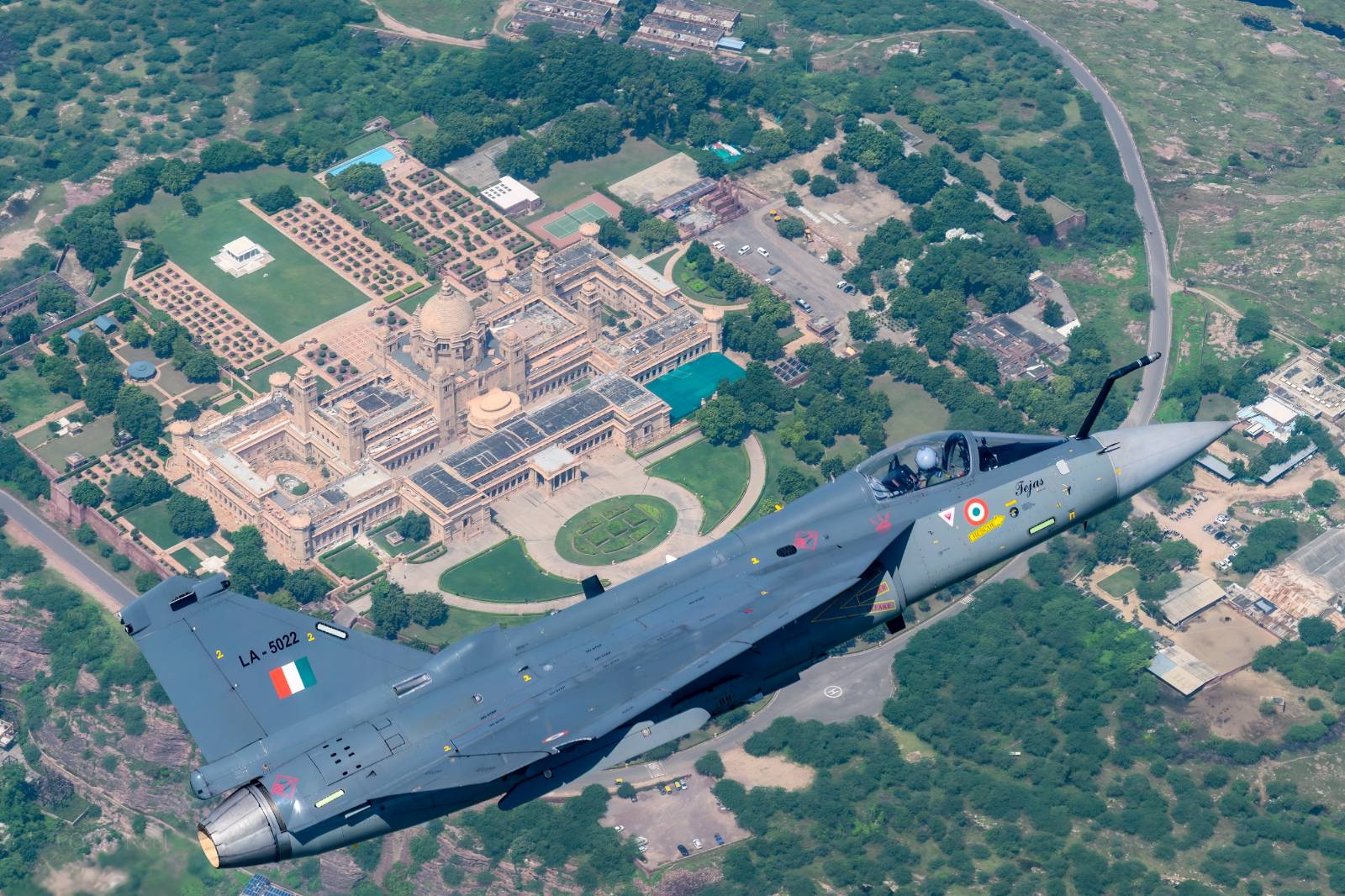
Tejas flying above Umaid Bhawan Palace

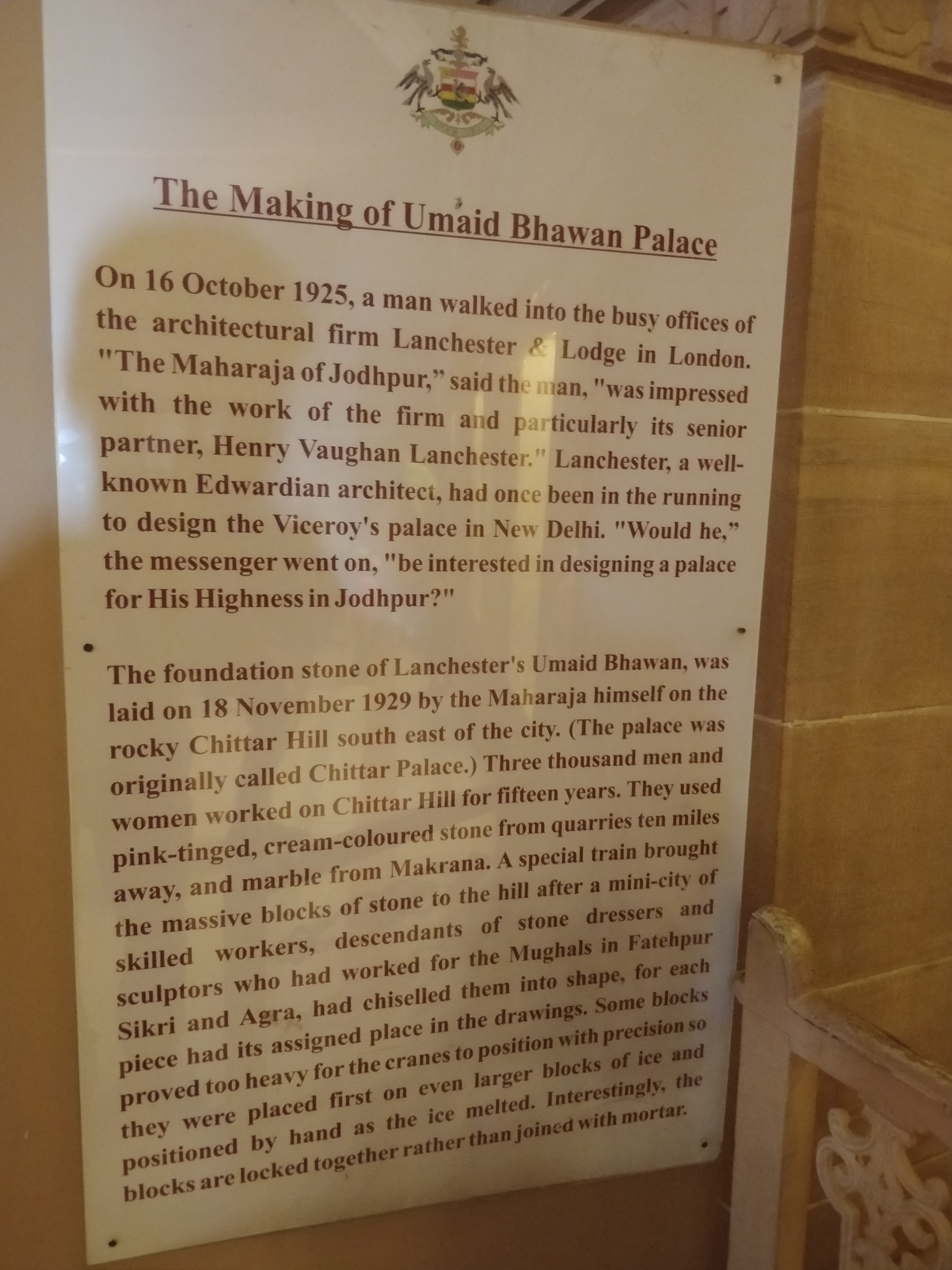
"The Making of Umaid Bhawan Palace"

The history of building the Umaid Bhawan Palace is linked to a curse by a saint who had said that a period of drought would follow the good rule of the Rathore Dynasty. Thus, after the end of the approximately 50-year reign of Pratap Singh, Jodhpur faced severe drought and famine in the 1920s for a period of three consecutive years. The farmers of the area, faced with this hardship, sought help of the then Maharaja, Umaid Singh, who was the 37th Rathore ruler of Marwar at Jodhpur. The Maharaja, in order to help the farmers, decided to build a lavish palace. He commissioned Henry Vaughan Lanchester as the architect to prepare the plans for the palace; Lanchester was a contemporary of Edwin Lutyens, who had planned the buildings of the New Delhi government complex. Lanchester patterned the Umaid Palace on the lines of the New Delhi building complex by adopting the theme of domes and columns. The palace was designed as a blend of western technology and Indian architectural features.

The palace was built at a slow pace as its initial objective was to provide employment to the famine-stricken farmers in the area. The foundation stone was laid in 1929. About 2,000 to 3,000 people were employed in its construction. Occupation of the palace by the Maharaja came after its completion in 1943, and close to the period of Indian Independence. There was some criticism for embarking on an expensive project but it had served the main purpose of helping the citizens of Jodhpur to face the famine situation. The estimated cost of building the palace was Rs 11 million. When it opened in 1943 it was considered one of the largest royal residences in the world.

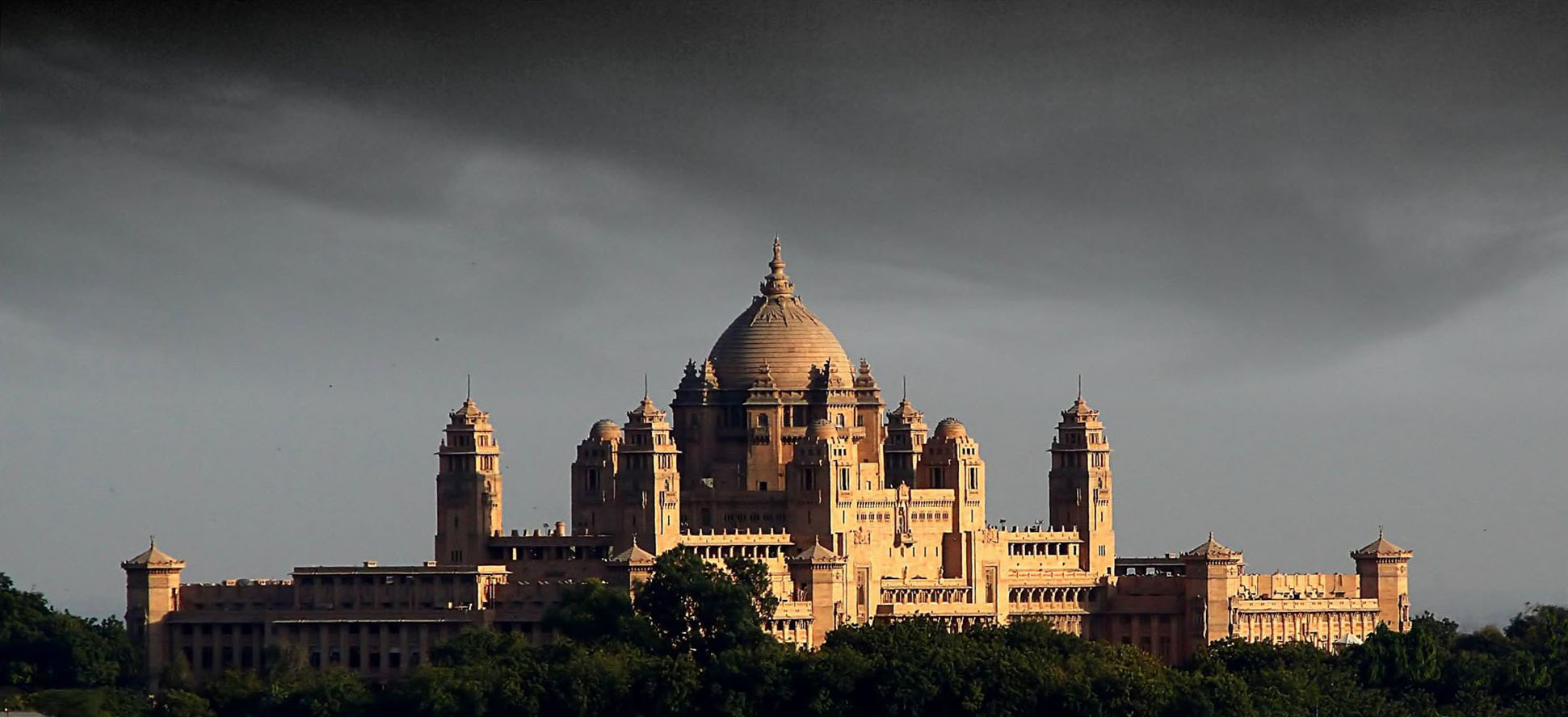
Umaid Bhawan Palace as seen from Mehrangarh Fort

The site chosen for the palace was on a hill known as Chittar hill in the outer limits of Jodhpur, after which the palace is also known, where no water supply was available nearby and hardly any vegetation grew as hill slopes were rocky. The building material required was not close by as sandstone quarries were at quite a distance. Since the Maharaja had the foresight to bring his project to fruition, he built a railway line to the quarry site to transport the building material. Donkeys were inducted to haul soil to the site. The sandstone transported by rail was dressed at the site into large blocks with interlocking joints so that they could be laid without the use of mortar.

The palace was built with "dun-coloured" (golden – yellow) sandstone with two wings. Makrana marble has also been used, and Burmese teak wood has been used for the interior woodwork. When completed the palace had 347 rooms, several courtyards, and a large banquet hall which could accommodate 300 people. The architectural style is considered representing the then in vogue Beaux-Arts architecture, also known as Indo-Deco style. However, for many years the palace did not fully function following tragic events in the royal family. Umaid Singh who stayed in the place for only four years died in 1947. Hanwant Singh who succeeded him also died at a young age; he had just won in the 1952 General Elections and was returning home after this win when his plane crashed and he died. Gaj Singh II who succeeded his father then decided in 1971 to convert a part of the palace into a hotel.

== Features ==
The palace is divided into three functional parts – the residence of the royal family, a luxury Taj Palace Hotel, and a museum focusing on the 20th-century history of the Jodhpur Royal Family.

=== Palace ===
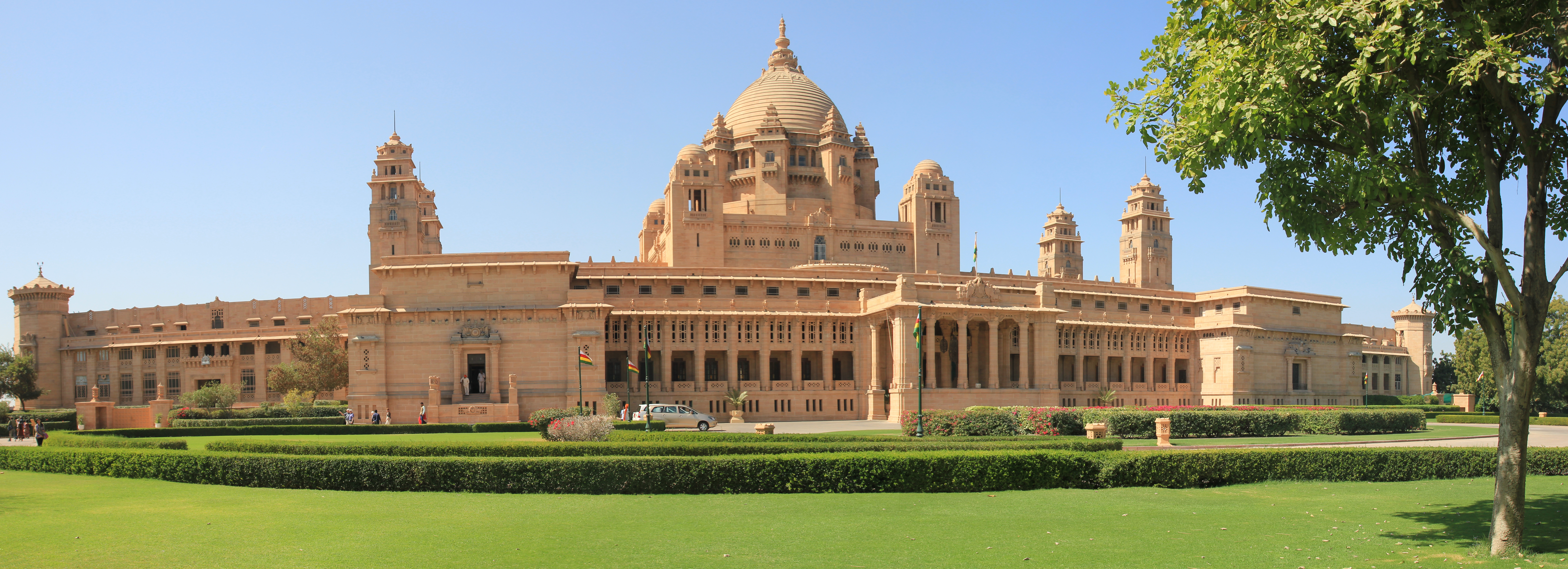
A panoramic view of the Palace.

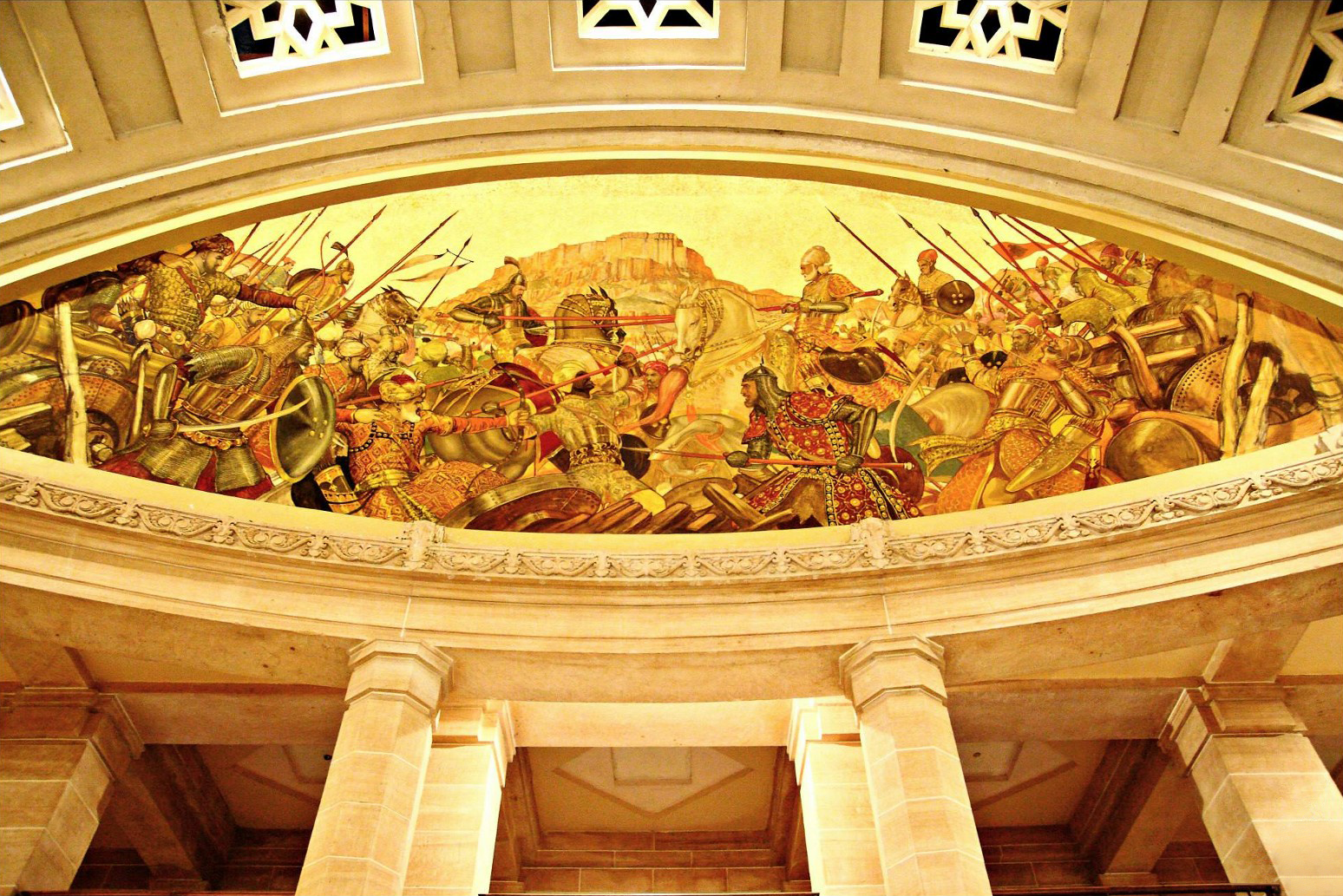
Painting (Fresco) inside Umaid Bhavan Palace, depicting the war between Mughals and Durgadas Rathore with the Mehrangarh fort in the backdrop.

The palace complex is set in an area of 26 acres (11 ha) of land including 15 acres (6.1 ha) of gardens. The palace consists of a throne chamber, a private meeting hall, a Durbar Hall to meet the public, a vaulted banquet hall, private dining halls, a ballroom, a library, an indoor swimming pool and spa, a billiards room, four tennis courts, two marble squash courts, and long passages.

The interior central dome sits above the sky blue inner dome. The inner vaulted dome is a major attraction in the palace which rises to 103 feet (31 m) in the interior part which is capped by an outer dome of 43 feet (13 m) height. The entry to the palace has decorations of the Coat of arms of the Rathore Royal family. The entry leads to the lobby which has polished black granite flooring. The lounge area has pink sandstone and marble floors. Maharaja Gaj Singh, known as "bapji", stays in a part of the palace. The principal architecture of the palace is an amalgam of Indo-Saracenic, Classical Revival and Western Art Deco styles. It is also said the Maharaja and his architect Lanchester had considered the features of Buddhist and Hindu edifices such as the Temple Mountain-Palaces of Burma and Cambodia, and in particular the Angkor Wat in preparing the layout and design of the palace. The interior of the palace is in art deco design. The interior decoration is credited to J.S. Norblin, a refugee from Poland, who created the frescoes in the throne room on the east wing. An architectural historian commented that "it is the finest example of Indo-deco. The forms are crisp and precise".

=== Hotel ===
The hotel wing of the palace is run by the Taj Group of Hotels and is called the "Taj Umaid Bhawan Palace Jodhpur".

=== Museum ===
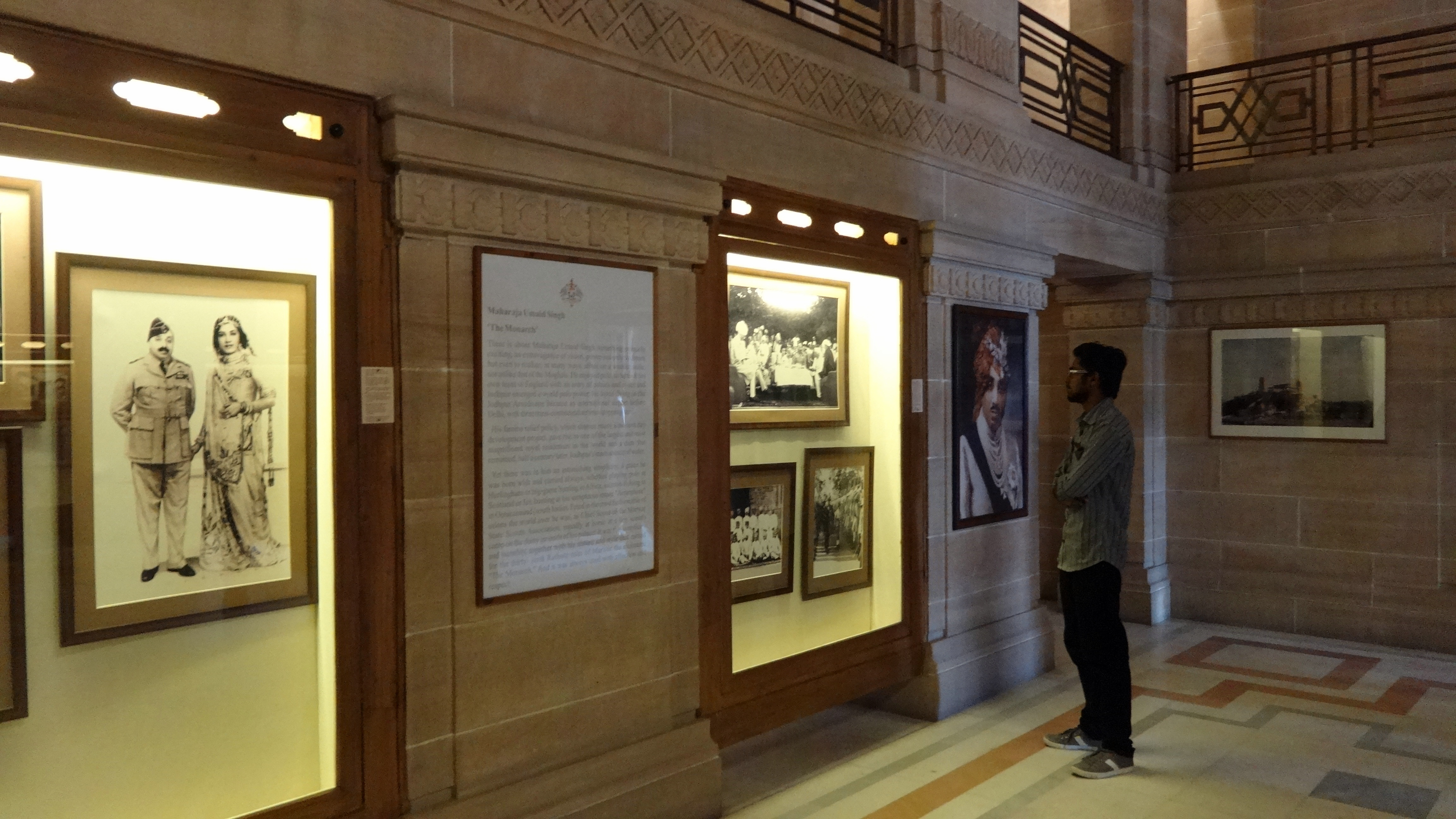
Inside the museum of Umaid Bhawan Palace

The museum has exhibits of stuffed leopards, a very large symbolic flag given to Maharaja Jaswant Singh by Queen Victoria in 1877, lighthouse shapes. The classic cars of the Maharajas are also on display in the garden in front of the museum.

== See also ==
- Rajput architecture
