= Gaj Singh =

Maharaja of Jodhpur, Indian politician and diplomat

Gaj Singh II
- Maharaja of Jodhpur
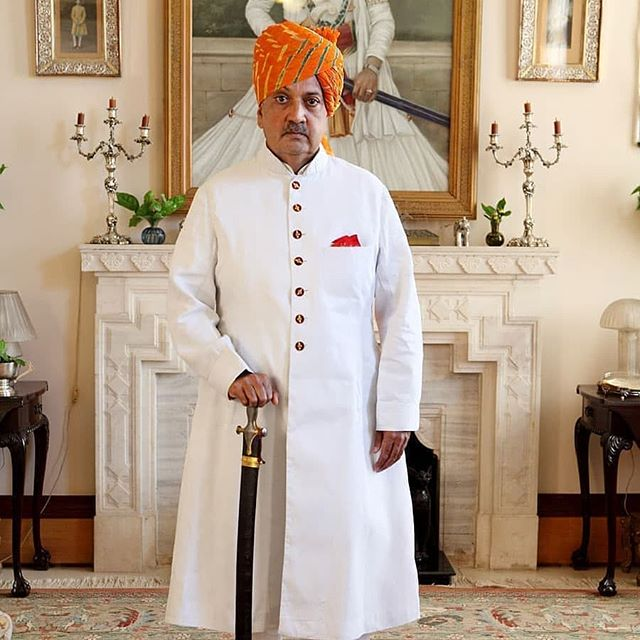
- Gaj Singh in 2013

Maharaja of Jodhpur
- Reign: 26 January 1952 – present
- Coronation: 12 May 1952
- Predecessor: Hanwant Singh
- Successor: Shivraj Singh
- Regent: Krishna Kumari

Head of the Rathore dynasty
- Tenure: 26 January 1952 – present
- Coronation: 12 May 1952
- Predecessor: Hanwant Singh
- Heir apparent: Shivraj Singh
- Born: 13 January 1948 (age 78); Jodhpur, Jodhpur State, Union of India (present-day Rajasthan, India)
- Spouse: Hemlata Rajye (m. 1973)
- Issue: Princess Shivranjani Rajye; Crown Prince Shivraj Singh
- Dynasty: Rathore
- Father: Hanwant Singh
- Mother: Krishna Kumari
- Religion: Hinduism
- Education: Cothill House; Eton College; Christ Church, Oxford

Styles of the Maharaja of Jodhpur
- Reference style: His Highness (H.H.)
- Spoken style: Your Highness

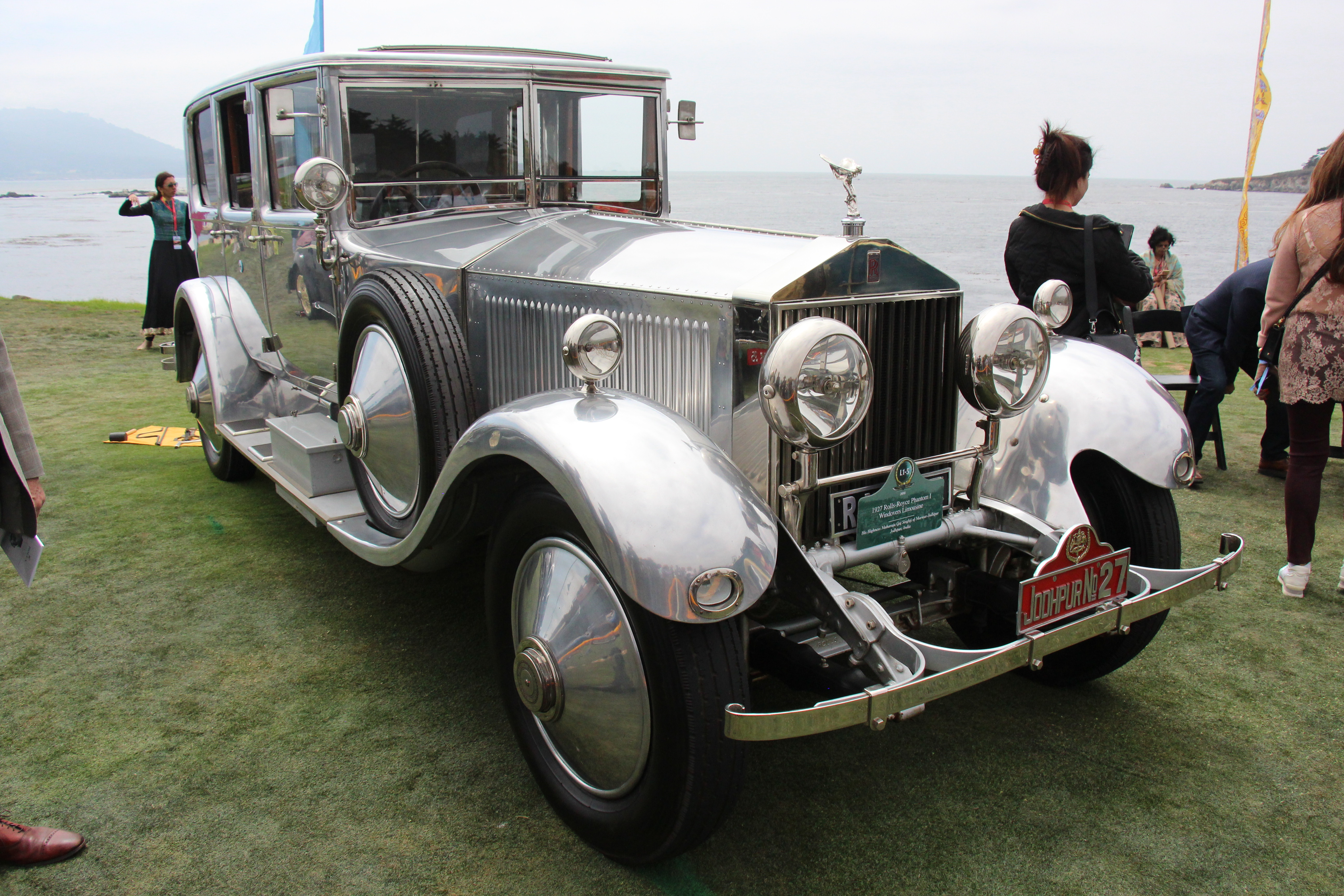
The 1927 Rolls-Royce of Gaj Singh

Gaj Singh II (born 13 January 1948), known as 'Bapji' (meaning 'father'), is the Head of the Rathore Dynasty and Maharaja of Jodhpur from 1952, as well as an Indian politician, and diplomat.

== Early years and accession ==
Gaj Singh was born on 13 January 1948 to Hanwant Singh and his first wife, Krishna Kumari, in the Zenana (women's quarters) of Umaid Bhawan Palace. When his father, Hanwant Singh, lost his life in an air accident in 1952, the throne and titles were passed to him at the age of four. To mark his accession, a safa of five colors—pink, white, red, saffron, and green, which are also the colors of the Jodhpur State flag—was designed and is called Gaj Shahi.

During his minority, his mother, Krishna Kumari, acted as regent. He received a privy purse of 10 lakh rupees and continued to receive it until the 26th Amendment in 1971 abolished it.

== Education ==
He received his early education at home. At the age of eight in 1956, he was sent first to Cothill House, a prep school in Oxfordshire, and then in 1961 to Eton College, Eton, and Christ Church, Oxford, where he graduated in 1970 with a degree in Politics, Philosophy, and Economics.

== Return to Jodhpur ==
In 1970, following the completion of his education, he returned to Jodhpur to fulfill his duties as the Maharaja of Jodhpur, assuming control of his vast inheritance as well as the manifold social and cultural responsibilities that accompanied it.

== Derecognition ==
On 28 December 1971, following the assent of the then President of India, V. V. Giri, the 26th Amendment to the Constitution of India was enacted by Parliament. This amendment abolished the official recognition of titles, privileges, and special rights that had been granted to the rulers of the former princely states.

This deprived him and other rulers of the government annuities that had been guaranteed to them both in the Constitution and in the covenants of accession through which their states had been merged with the Dominion of India in 1947.

== Family ==
On 19 February 1973, in a simple ceremony at Dehradun, he married Hemlata Rajye, the daughter of Shiv Rattan Dev Singh, Raja of Poonch, and his wife, Nalini Rajya Lakshmi Devi, the daughter of Tribhuvan Bir Bikram Shah Dev.

They have two children: a daughter, Shivranjani Rajye (born 22 August 1974), and a son, Shivraj Singh (born 30 September 1975).

He has two sisters, Chandresh Kumari and Shailesh Kumari, and a paternal half-brother, Hukum Singh, who was murdered.

== Career ==
He served from June 1978 to July 1980 as High Commissioner of India, with accreditation spanning the Republic of Trinidad and Tobago, Barbados, Dominica, Saint Lucia, Grenada, and Saint Vincent and the Grenadines. At the same time, he also served as Commissioner to Antigua and Barbuda, Saint Kitts and Nevis, Montserrat, Turks and Caicos Islands, and the Cayman Islands.

He also served a term in the Rajya Sabha, the Upper House of the Indian Parliament.

On 20 July 1992, he established Rajmata Krishna Kumari Girls' Public School, a day and residential school for girls, named in honor of his mother.

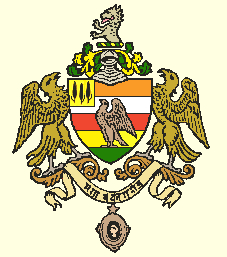
Maharaja of Jodhpur's coat of arms

== Philanthropy ==
Singh heads a number of philanthropic institutions and religious charitable trusts.

=== Indian Head Injury Foundation ===
When his son, Shivraj Singh, suffered serious head injuries during a polo match in Jaipur in 2005 and lapsed into a coma, he saw that only a few private hospitals in India could handle such cases. To address this, he started the Indian Head Injury Foundation to quickly treat traumatic brain injuries, especially for those in India with limited resources.

== See also ==
- Rulers of Marwar
