= List of Asian art awards =

Main art awards given by organizations in Asia

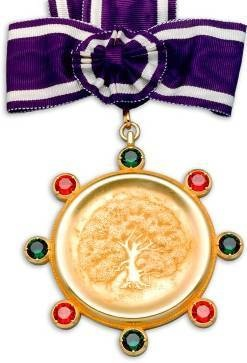
Kyoto Prize

This List of Asian art awards covers some of the main art awards given by organizations in Asia. Some are restricted to artists from a particular country or region, and some are open to artists from around the world.

== India ==
Award	Sponsor	Notes
Jakanachari Award	Government of Karnataka	Talented sculptors and craftsmen from the state
Kaivinai Pokkisham Award	Government of Tamil Nadu	Best artisans in the State
Kala Ratna	Government of Andhra Pradesh	Awards for literature, music, dance, painting, sculpture, folk and tribal arts
Kalaimamani	Tamil Nadu Iyal Isai Nataka Manram	Excellence in the field of art and literature
Kalidas Samman	Government of Madhya Pradesh	Conferred in alternate years in the fields of Classical Music, Classical Dance, Theatre and Plastic Arts
Kamal Kumari National Award	Kamal Kumari Foundation	Outstanding contribution to Art, Culture & Literature and Science & Technology.
Nataka Kalasarathy	Parthasarathy Swami Sabha	Awarded annually to a dramatist
National Handicrafts Award	Government of India	Outstanding craftspersons in the Handicraft sector
Nishagandhi Puraskaram	Department of Tourism (Kerala)	Personalities in the fields of music and dance
Padma Vibhushan (in Arts)	Government of India	Exceptional and distinguished service
Padma Bhushan (in Arts)	Government of India	Distinguished service of a high order. On 15 January 1955, the Padma Vibhushan was reclassified into three different awards: the Padma Vibhushan, the highest of the three, followed by the Padma Bhushan and the Padma Shri.
Padma Shri (in Arts)	Government of India	Distinguished contribution
Poompuhar State Award	Tamil Nadu Handicrafts Development Corporation	Outstanding artisans
Sangeet Natak Akademi Award	Sangeet Natak Akademi	Practicing artists. Since 2009 cash prize has been increased to ₹1,00,000.
Sangeet Natak Akademi Fellowship	Sangeet Natak Akademi	Performing arts
Lalit Kala Akademi Fellowship	Lalit Kala Akademi	Eminent artists for their lifetime achievements in the field of visual arts by the Lalit Kala Akademi, India's National Academy of Art
Sant Kabir Award	Ministry of Textiles	Dedication in building up linkages between the past, present and future through dissemination of knowledge on traditional skills and designs
Shilp Guru	Government of India	Master craftspersons in innovating different styles and designs of the traditional craftsmanship
The Skoda Prize	British Council etc.	Indian contemporary art
Tagore Ratna and Tagore Puraskar	Sangeet Natak Akademi	Award for the performing arts
Tulsi Samman	Government of Madhya Pradesh	Tribal, traditional and folk arts: art, theatre, dance and music
Varnashilpi Venkatappa Award	Government of Karnataka	For excellence in painting

== Israel ==
Award	Sponsor	Notes
Andrea M. Bronfman Prize for the Arts	Charles Bronfman family	Israeli decorative artist working in ceramics, glass, textiles or jewellery
Constantiner Photography Award for an Israeli Artist	Tel Aviv Museum of Art	For an Israeli photographer
Dizengoff Prize	Tel Aviv Municipality	Painting and sculpture
Wolf Prize in Arts	Wolf Foundation	Rotates annually among painting, music, architecture and sculpture

== Japan ==
Award	Sponsor	Notes
Asahi Prize for Arts	Asahi Shimbun and Asahi Shimbun Foundation	Accomplishments in the arts and academics and contributions to the development and progress of Japanese culture and society at large.
Bungeishunjū Manga Award	Bungeishunjū	(No longer awarded) Gag, yonkoma, one-panel, and satirical manga.
Daiwa Foundation Art Prize	Daiwa Anglo-Japanese Foundation	British artists resident in the United Kingdom who have not previously had a solo exhibition in Japan
Fukuoka Prize	City of Fukuoka, Fukuoka City International Foundation	Outstanding work ... in preserving or creating Asian culture
International Manga Award	Ministry of Foreign Affairs (Japan)	Non-Japanese manga artists
International TAKIFUJI Art Award	Japan Traffic Culture Association	Students who belong to the designated art schools
Kyoto Prize in Arts and Philosophy	Inamori Foundation	Lifetime achievements in the arts and philosophy.
Otaka prize	NHK Symphony Orchestra	Japanese composer for an outstanding orchestral work
Praemium Imperiale	Imperial House of Japan	Painting, sculpture, architecture, music, and theatre/film.
Taro Okamoto Award	Taro Okamoto Museum of Art	Artists who succeed the challenging spirit of Taro Okamoto manifested in the making of creative works with individual expression
Tezuka Award	Shueisha	(No longer awarded?) New manga artists in the Story Manga category
Tezuka Osamu Cultural Prize	Asahi Shimbun	Manga artists or their works that follow the Osamu Tezuka manga approach

== Southeast Asia ==
Country	Award	Sponsor	Notes
Indochina	Prix de l'Indochine	École des Beaux-Arts de l'Indochine	(no longer awarded)
Indonesia	Asia Cosmopolitan Awards	Economic Research Institute for ASEAN and East Asia	Contributions to the development and enrichment of East Asian Community in the field of cultural and economic integration
Singapore	Cultural Medallion	National Arts Council, Singapore	Artistic excellence in dance, theatre, literature, music, photography, art and film
Thailand	Silpathorn Award	Office of Contemporary Art and Culture, Ministry of Culture of Thailand	Thai contemporary artists who are considered to be in their mid-career and who have already made notable contributions to Thai fine arts and culture.
Malaysia	BOH Cameronian Arts Awards	Kakiseni, BOH Plantations	The BOH Cameronian Arts Awards (since 2002) celebrates outstanding performances in dance, music, theatre and musical theatre performed in the previous year. It is dedicated to raising the profile of the arts in Malaysia and to recognize the contribution of artists in various areas of the performing arts.

== Other ==
Country	Award	Sponsor	Notes
Pakistan	Arjumand Painting Award	Gallery 6 Islamabad	National Biennial Painting Award
Dubai	Hamdan International Photography Award	Hamdan bin Mohammed Al Maktoum	International photography award
Qatar	Arab Cartoon Award	Ministry of Culture Arts and Heritage of Qatar etc.	Artistic excellence in drawing cartoons (caricature) in the Arab World
South Korea	Ho-Am Prize in the Arts	Samsung	Culture that continues the noble spirit of public service.

== See also ==
- Lists of art awards
