= R Emberumal =

Indian craftsman and Kalamkari artist (1941–2016)

- Born: 15 July 1941; Sikkalanayakkanpettai, Ariyalur district, Tamil Nadu, India
- Died: 2 November 2016 (aged 75); Sikkalanayakkanpettai, Ariyalur district, Tamil Nadu, India
- Occupations: Kalamkari artist Master craftsman
- Known for: Kalamkari
- Awards: Shilp Guru; National Award

R Emberumal was an Indian traditional textile artist and master craftsman, known for his contributions to the conservation by the practice of the Thanjavur (or Kodalikaruppur) variant of Kalamkari, a traditional Indian textile-art form.

He received the Shilp Guru and the National award.

== Life ==
Emberumal was born on 15 July 1941 into a family of Kalamkari artists at Sikkalanayakkanpettai on the banks of the river Kollidam in the Ariyalur district of Tamil Nadu. Their ancestors shifted from nearby Kodalikaruppur which was the native town of several Kalamkari artists for several centuries under the patronage of Tanjore Nayaka kings.

He took up the family's traditional profession and became a master craftsman of the karuppur kalamkari style which is more tantric and geometrical in its designs and symbols compared to other kalamkari styles of India.

Emberumal's works have been exhibited in several international exhibitions, festival, trade shows and museums.

His works featured in the art book South Indian Traditions of Kalamkari by Lotika Varadarajan.

== Awards ==
- 2002: received national award by the Government of India in 2002 for his contributions to Kalamkari art.
- 2005: received Shilp Guru honour from the Government of India in 2005 for his contributions to Kalamkari art.

== See also ==
- List of Indian artists
- List of people from Tamil Nadu
