= Susheel Kaur =

- Rajkumari of Chamba
- Born: Rajkumari Susheel Kanwar; Chamba State, Punjab Hills (present-day Himachal Pradesh, India)
- Died: 1716; Delhi, Mughal Empire (present-day Delhi, India)
- Spouse: Banda Singh Bahadur (m.1711- 1716)
- Issue: Ajai Singh
- House: Mushana (by birth)
- Father: Maharaja Udai Singh of Chamba
- Religion: Sikhism

Susheel Kaur also referred to as Mata Susheel Kaur was the wife of Sikh General Banda Singh Bahadur, who established the first Sikh state and the mother of his son, Ajai Singh. She was the only daughter of Maharaja Udai Singh of Chamba.

== Early life and marriage ==
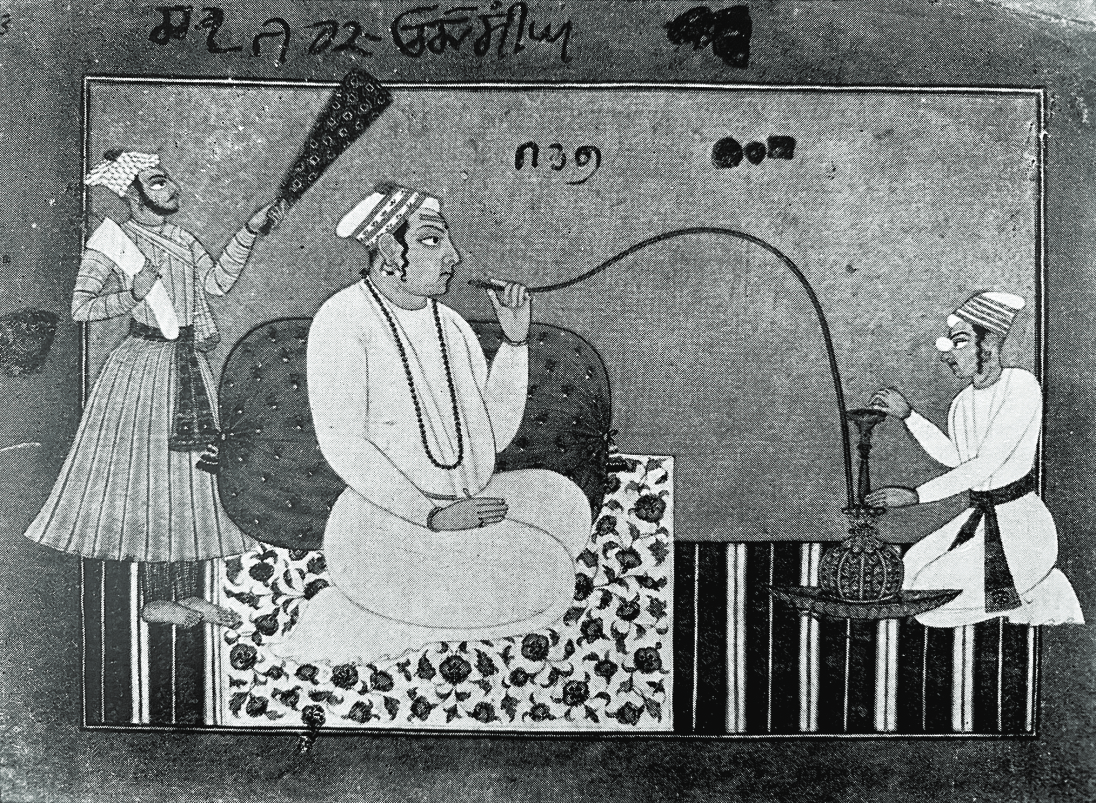
Painting of Udai Singh of Chamba smoking huqqa, father of Sushil Kaur, c. 1710

Susheel Kaur was born as Rajkumari Susheel Kanwar to Maharaja Udai Singh. Like the princesses of her time she was trained in sword fighting, equestrianism, as well as arts and craft; she was skilled in embroidery handicraft of the Chamba Rumal. Her known physical and personal attributes describe her as being extremely beautiful, graceful and delicate. Max Arthur Macauliffe describes her as a "Goddess of Love" the physical embodiment of Rati.

Udai Singh invited Banda Singh to Chamba and following his brother Lakshman Singh's advised, proposed a wedding alliance to him. Banda Singh agreed and the wedding took place in March 1711. Brought up as a Sahajdhari she became Sushil Kaur upon her marriage to the Banda Singh. In 1712, she gave birth to his son, Ajai Singh.

== Capture and death ==
Susheel and her infant son accompanied Banda Singh when he marched with his army to Gurdas Nangal. The Sikhs defended the fort for 8 months but on December 7, 1715, the Mughal army under Abd al-Samad Khan besieged the fort and took the Sikhs along with Banda, Susheel and Ajai captive. Banda Singh was paraded in an iron cage while the remaining Sikhs were chained and brought to Delhi. In Delhi, she was separated from her husband and son and taken to the prison. Just like the other Sikh prisoners she remained unmoved on giving up her faith no matter what riches were promised to them. Every day for 7 days, 100 Sikh soldiers were brought out of the fort and murdered in public. On June 9, 1716, her four-year son, Ajai and husband, Banda Singh were cruelly executed. Ajai Singh's heart was cut out, and thrust into his father's mouth. Ajai Singh died in his father's lap while Banda Singh's limbs eyes were gouged out, his skin was removed, his limbs severed, and then he was decapitated.

Historians such as Karam Singh and Dr. Raj Pal Singh (referencing the work by Shiv Das Lakhnavi ‘Shahnama Munawwar Kalam’) make a claim that the Raj Kumari of Chamba—overcome by the agony of witnessing her son’s torture—converted to Islam. They also assert that Banda Singh Bahadur’s wife similarly embraced Islam, entered the palace, and became part of the royal seraglio. In contrast, Mata Joginder Kaur of Dera Baba Banda Singh Bahadur disputes these claims, arguing that a woman who spent nearly two years living in the wilderness with Banda Singh Bahadur and fought alongside him would be unlikely to convert; instead, she contends that Bibi Shushil Kaur ultimately chose to end her own life to safeguard her honor from being compromised in the imperial harem. Moreover, historians Hari Ram Gupta and Ganda Singh report that Banda Singh Bahadur’s wife, together with their four‑year‑old son, Ajai Singh, and his nurse, was captured and taken to Delhi, where they were admitted into the harem of Darbar Khan Nazir.

Genealogical tradition records that Sardarni Bibi Sushil Kaur married Banda Singh Bahadur at Chamba in 1711. This account relates that Banda Singh was tortured and executed on 9 June 1716 at Delhi following the killing of his young son. According to the same tradition, Bibi Sushil Kaur ended her life while in confinement on 20 June 1716, after witnessing the murder of her only child, Ajai Singh, aged four.

Some historians argue that this account aligns with the broader Rajput and Kshatriya tradition of jauhar—a practice in which women chose death over the possibility of dishonour in the face of defeat, siege, or imminent capture. Under this interpretation, Bibi Sushil Kaur’s reported suicide while imprisoned in Delhi may reflect the same cultural ethos observed in several Rajput lineages.
