= Rebakanta Mahanta =

Indian artist

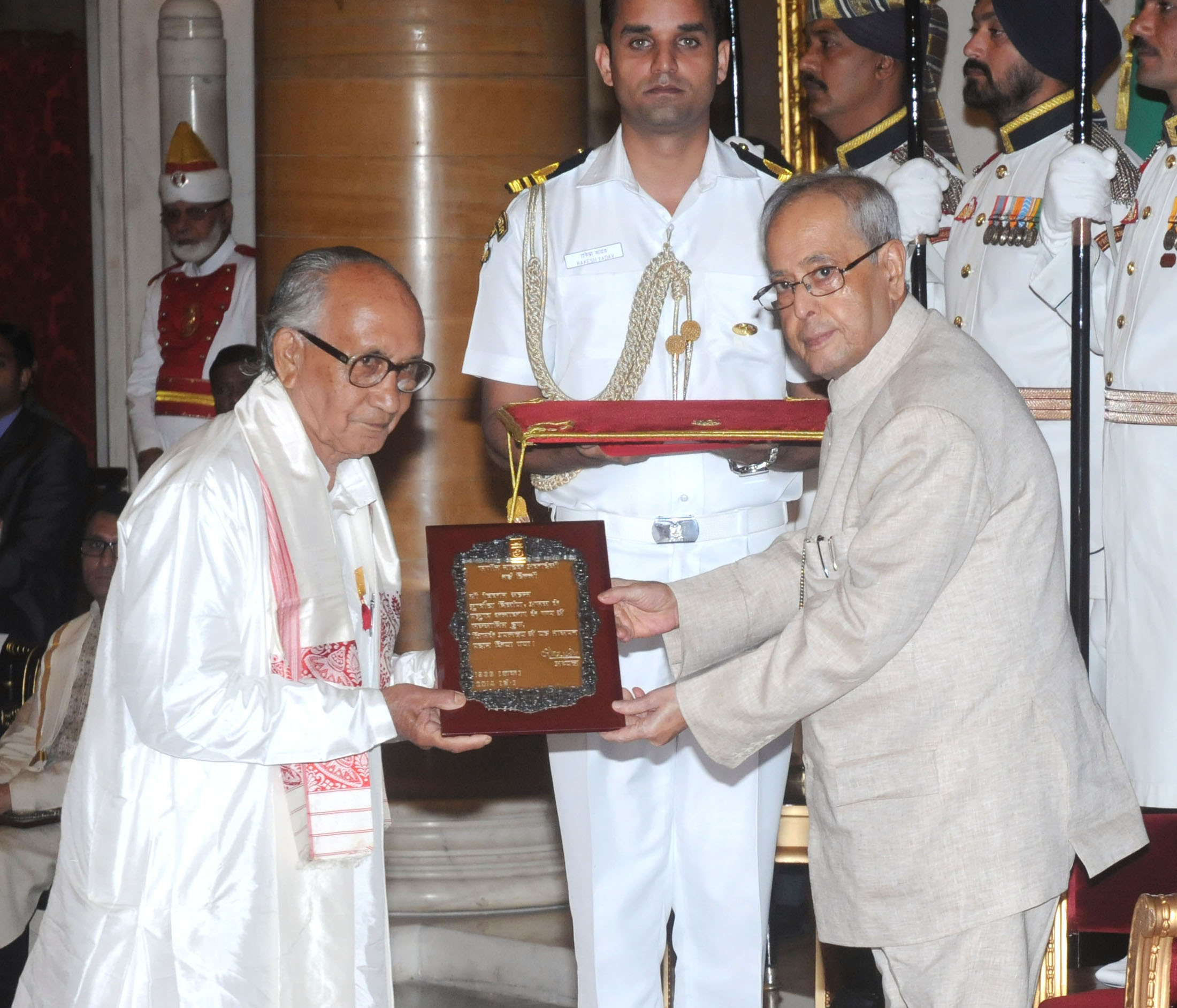
- Born: 19 April 1935 (age 90); Khatpar Satra, Sivasagar, Assam
- Known for: Mask Art of Assam
- Partner: Gopikanta Mahanta
- Awards: Sahitya Akademi Award; Shilp Guru Award; Bishnu Prasad Rabha Award

Rebakanta Mahanta is a Sattriya artist from Assam, India, who specialises in traditional bamboo mask masking. He started learning the art of mask making as a child from his father. For his contribution in the field of mask masking, he has been a recipient of the Sangeet Natak Akademi Award in 2014, Shilp Guru Award in 2008 and Bishu Prasad Rabha. in 2015.

In January 2025, he was honored with the Padma Shri, India's fourth-highest civilian award, by the Government of India.

== See also ==
- Mask Art of Assam
- Culture of Assam
