= Brahmdeo Ram Pandit =

Indian studio potter and craftsman (born 1949)

- Born: 2 March 1949 (age 77); Nawada, Bihar, India
- Occupation: Studio potter
- Spouse: Devki Pandit
- Children: Abhay; Shailesh
- Parent: Ram Pandit
- Awards: Padma Shri 2013; The All India Fine Arts and Crafts Society Award; Kamaladevi Chattopadhyay Award; Government of Maharashtra State Award; Shilp Guru
- Website: Official web site

Brahmdeo Ram Pandit is an Indian studio potter and craftsman, known for his expertise in making pottery. He was honoured by the Government of India, in 2013, by bestowing on him the Padma Shri, the fourth highest civilian award, for his contributions to the field of art.

== Biography ==
I am happy that ceramic art is getting recognition on par with other arts. This award will definitely encourage ceramic pottery artisans. Brahmdeo Ram Pandit, on winning Padma Shri

Brahmdeo Ram Pandit was born in Kumbhar family with meagre financial resources, on 2 March 1949, in the Nawada district, in the Indian state of Bihar, to Ram Pandit, a pottery maker who had learned histrade from his father, Murthi Pandit. He learned the basic craft of pottery making from his father and joined Sekho Devra Ashram in Kawakole, Nawada for formal training in pottery making which he completed in 1969. Later, obtaining a scholarship, he went to Khanapur, Belgaum in Karnataka and studied at the Central Village Pottery Institute, run by the Khadi and Village Industries Commission. In 1970, after completing his course the Belgaum institute, he joined, as an apprentice, at Aaj Studio, under the tutelage of Laxman R. Ajgaonkar, and worked there for a year. In 1971, he enrolled himself at the J. J. School of Art, Mumbai and studied clay modelling and sculpture, till 1976. Another scholarship assisted him to join Lalit Kala Akademi, New Delhi and studied there till 1981. Another ten years of learning on advanced pottery making in Japan, Hong Kong, Taiwan and Singapore rounded up his studies in 1991.

Pandit started his career by joining the faculty of Sophia College Polytechnic, Mumbai, in 1973, while pursuing his advanced training and studies, and taught there till 2005. He also taught at Shri Basant Kumar Memorial Polytechnic, Mumbai and also at Kamala Mehta Dadar School for the Blind, Mumbai during a period from 1985 to 2013. He was a guest tutor at the various pottery training programmes organized by the Maharashtra Handicrafts, a state run organization. He was said to be popular among the students among whom he was known as Panditji.

Brahmdeo Pandit founded Pandit Art Ceramic, a manufacturing unit of modest proportions, in 1981, at Kalakar Niwas in Bhayandar, a city in Thane district of Maharashtra, for the mass production of his creations. The unit produces around 300 pots a day and is said to be a preferred source point for bonsai growers and ikebana artists.

Brahmdeo Ram Pandit is married to Devki, a known studio potter and a 1981 Maharashtra state award recipient, and the couple has two sons, Abhay and Sailesh, both accomplished artists in their own rights, the former, a graduate from the J. J. School of Art and the latter, a protégé of Ray Meekar and Deborah Smith of the Golden Bridge Pottery, Pondicherry and a winner of Chares Wallace India Trust award in 2005. The family, his daughter in law, Khushboo, herself a potter, included, run the Pandit Art Ceramic and resides at Bhyander.

== Career highlights and exhibitions ==
Brahmdeo Pandit's creations are considered by many, as some of the finest in the pottery world. The Rashtrapati Bhavan has displayed five of his creations in its art gallery. Establishments like Taj Hotels Resorts and Palaces and Nikki Bonsai use the creations from Brahmdeo Ram Pandit. One of his ceramic art installation, Water, has been commissioned at the terminal II of the Mumbai International Airport.

Pandit has had several solo exhibitions, notably at Jehangir Art Gallery and Sophia College Art Gallery. He has also participated in exhibitions at Cymroza Art Gallery, Mumbai, National Gallery of Modern Art Mumbai and Art Heritage Gallery, New Delhi. Paramparik Karigar has hosted several of his exhibitions. Pandit has also conducted several pottery workshops in India and abroad, in countries such as Japan, Germany and Spain, under Government of India cultural exchange programmes.

Brahmdeo Pandit has coauthored a book, published by Paramparik Karigar under the title, Paramparik Karigar : An Association of Craftspersons : Gadwakam Kalamkari; Mithila Kala; Mittikam.

- Jaidev Baghel; Jonnalgadda Guruppa Chetty; Brahmdeo Ram Pandit; Satya Narayan Lal Karn (2005). Paramparik Karigar An Association of Craftspersons Gadwakam, Kalamkari, Mithila Kala, Mitti Kam, Tana Bana. Mumbai: Paramparik Karigar. p. 337.

Pandit's creations have been included in a book, Contemporary Ceramics, edited by Emmanuel Cooper.

- Emmanuel Cooper (5 October 2009). Contemporary Ceramics. UK: Thames & Hudson. p. 304. ISBN 978-0500514870.

== Awards and recognitions ==
Brahmadeo Ram Pandit has been recognized for his art by many organizations. He is a two-time winner of the All India Fine Arts and Crafts Society Award and has won the Kamaladevi Chattopadhyay Award once which he received in 2007. The state of Maharashtra presented him with the state award in 1991 and in 2008, Ministry of Textiles, Government of India conferred the title Shilp Guru on him. Four years later, in 2012, the Government of Bihar awarded him the Pravasi Bihar Shri. This was followed by the award of Padma Shri, which he received the next year, in 2013.

== See also ==
- Studio pottery
