= Mughal rule in Himachal Pradesh =

Prior to the arrival of the Mughals in the Indian subcontinent, the first instance of Islamic conquest of the region was during the 10th century when Mahmud Ghaznavi conquered Kangra. After the entry of the Mughals into the subcontinent, the region fell to Mughal authority as well. Later, due to internal conflicts within the Mughal dynasty the rulers of the hill provinces took complete advantage. Kangra regained its independence under Maharaja Sansar Chand who ruled for nearly 50 years. He was one of the most powerful administrators of the region. After he took the formal possession of Kangra fort, Maharaja Sansar Chand began to expand his territory. The states of Chamba, Suket, Mandi, and Guler, Jaswan, Siba and Datarpur came under the direct control of Maharaja Sansar Chand.

== Mughal rule ==
The Mughals were aggressive toward the small states of the Western Himalayas, with Akbar declaring himself as their sovereign ruler. The Punjab Hill states became tributaries to the Mughals around the reign of Akbar (r. 1556–1605). With the capture of the Kangra Fort by the Mughal forces under Jahangir (r. 1605–1627), it allowed Mughal-influence to more effectively permeate into the Punjab Hills. The Mughals maintained regional influence through a kilahdar (fort-keeper) that was stationed at Kangra and hostages from more rebellious hill states were kept at the Mughal court. Twenty-two of the hill states recognized the sovereignty of Akbar and each dispatched a local prince to the Mughal court. The princes would effectively be hostages to ensure that the small hill states would act courteous to the Mughal authority. The Pahari hill states in-reality were de facto quite independent from the Mughals, even with this arrangement. This relative independence allowed the hill states freedom regarding their internal affairs and also allowed them to war against each-other without reference to the Mughal emperor. Usually when two hill states warred with one another, the defeated state often appealed to the regional Mughal viceroy and the Delhi court to assist them against their rival.

However, the hill states often resisted the Mughals and rose up in rebellion against them, such is the case with Jammu State, which rose in insurrection against the Mughals on three separate instances during this time: the first between the years 1588–9, the second between 1594–5, and the third from 1616–17. During the reign of Akbar between the years 1594–95, the Jammu ruler Raja Parasram Dev teamed-up with fellow Pahari rulers Rai Pratap of Jasrota and Rai Balbhadra of Lakhanpur in a rebellion against the Mughals, which raged from Kangra to the Jammu Hills.

According to Sikh legend, the sixth Sikh guru, Guru Hargobind, helped secure the release of 52 "Rajput rajas" of the Hill region who were jailed in Gwalior Fort. This event is celebrated as Bandi Chhor Divas by Sikhs. Portraiture of rulers arose in the Pahari polities in the first quarter of the 16th century.

== Anglo-Gorkha war ==
The Gorkhas (martial tribe) came to power in Nepal in 1768. The gorkhas consolidated their military power and expanded their territory. Over a period of time the Gorkhas annexed Sirmour and Shimla hill states. Under the leadership of Amar Singh Thapa, Gorkhas laid their siege to Kangra. They defeated Maharaja Sansar Chand who was the ruler of Kangra, in 1806 with the help of hill chiefs. However, Gorkhas were not able to capture Kangra fort which came under the direct control of Maharaja Ranjeet Singh in 1809. After the defeat the Gorkhas began to expand towards the southern provinces. This led to the Anglo-Gorkha war. They came into direct conflict with the British along the tarai belt after which the British expelled them. The British slowly emerged as the paramount powers in this conflict.

== Anglo-Sikh war ==
After the Anglo-Gorkha war the common border shared by the British domain and Punjab became extremely sensitive. Both the Sikhs and British wanted to avoid a direct conflict, but after the death of Ranjit Singh, the Khalsa army fought numerous wars with the British. In 1845 when the Sikhs invaded the British territory by crossing the Satluj river, the rulers of many hill provinces sided with the British. Many of these hill state rulers entered into the secret communication with the British. After the first Anglo-sikh war, the British did not restore the hill territory, departed by the Sikhs, to the original owners.
