= Pravakar Maharana =

Indian sculptor

Pravakar Maharana is an Indian sculptor and painter from Odisha. In 2018, he received the Padma Sri honour by the President of India for his contributions towards the preservation of traditional sculpture art of Odisha.

== Early life ==
Maharana was born in the Indian state of Odisha. He had his schooling and childhood days in the village and had inclination towards drawings and paintings that tempted him to visit different temples in Konark, Bhubaneswar and Puri to draw sketches of different art forms from sculptures and paintings. Maharana was a recipient of the Shilp Guru award in 2015.
