= Chamba Rumal =

Handkerchief paintings, an embroidered handicraft

- Geographical indication
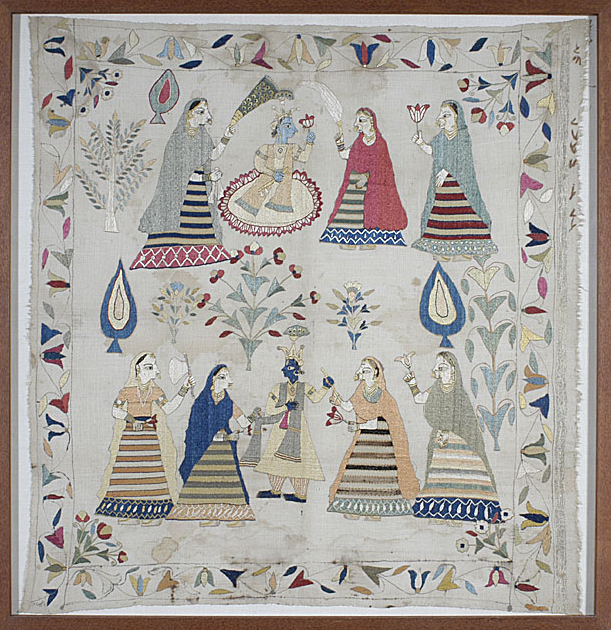
- Chamba Rumal (handkerchief)
- Alternative names: Chamba handkerchief
- Description: Handicraft
- Type: Embroidery
- Area: Himachal Pradesh
- Country: India
- Registered: March 2010
- Material: Silk and cotton (muslin or mulmul)

The Chamba Rumal or Chamba handkerchief is an embroidered handicraft that was once promoted under the patronage of the former rulers of Chamba kingdom. It is a common gift during marriages with detailed patterns in bright colour schemes.

This product has been registered for protection under the Geographical Indication of the Trade Related Intellectual Property Rights (TRIPS) agreement. On 22 January 2007, it was listed as "Chamba Rumal" under the GI Act 1999 of the Government of India with registration confirmed by the Controller General of Patents Designs and Trademarks under Classes 24 as Textile and Textile Goods.

== History ==
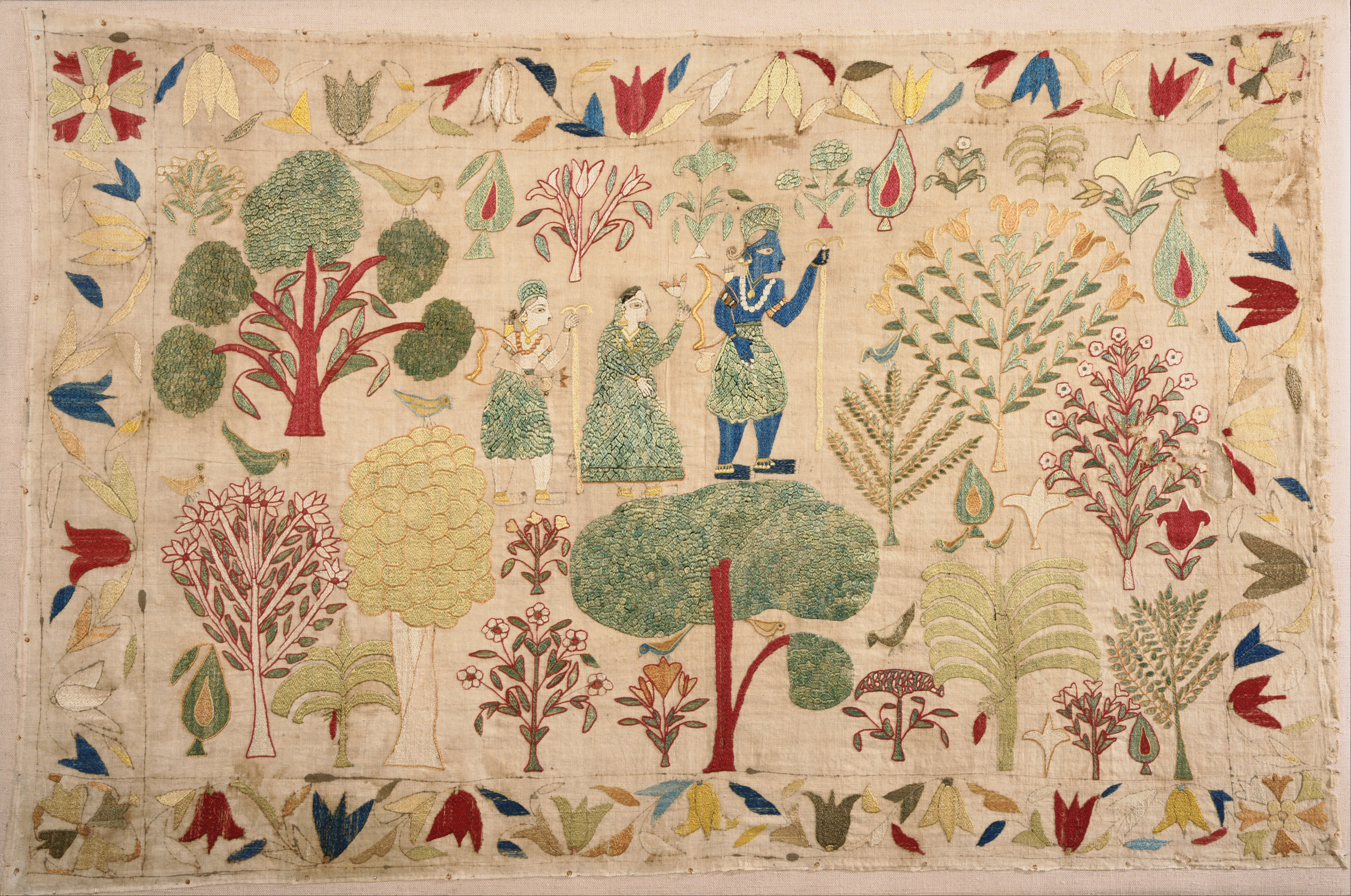
Chamba Rumal, a ceremonial cover

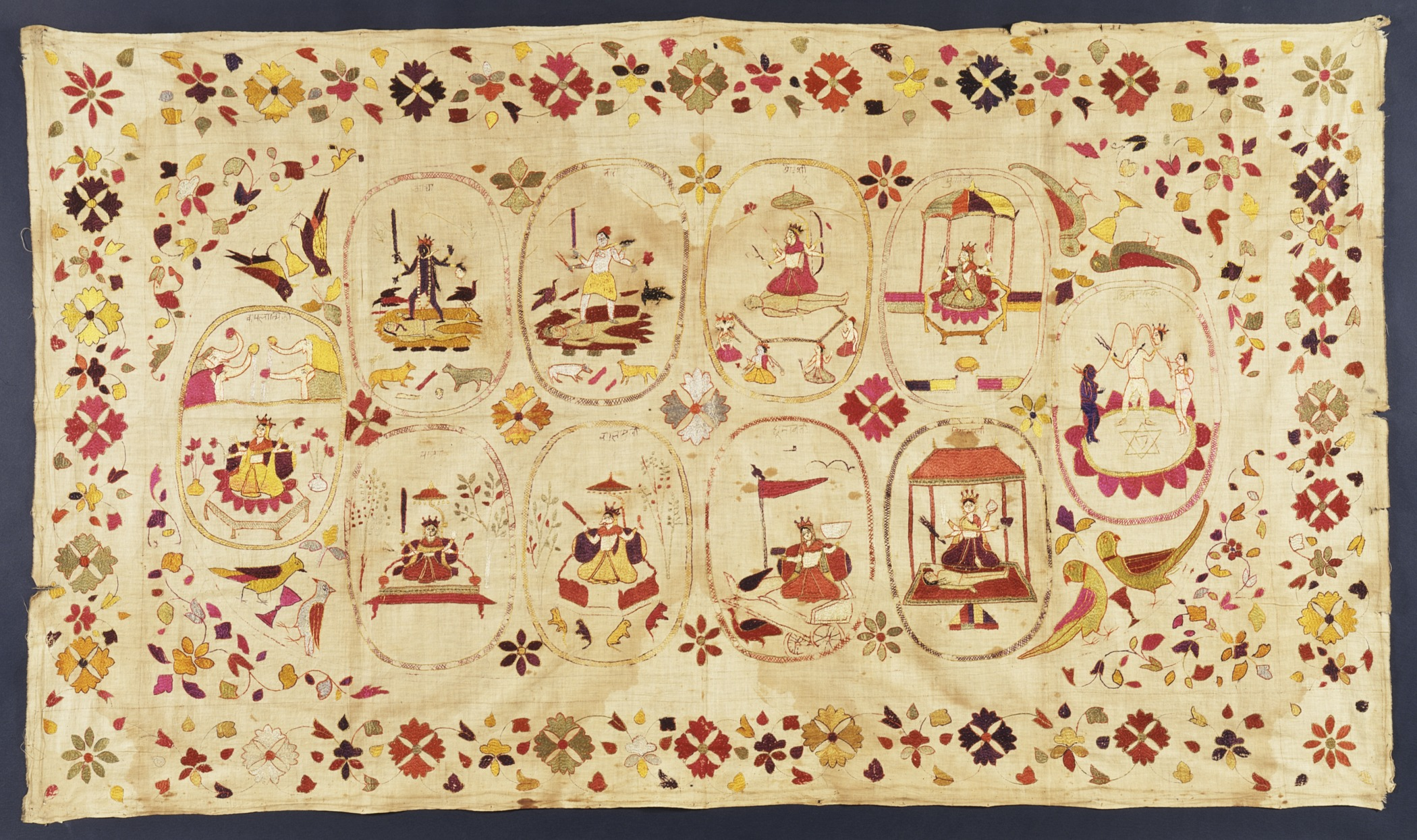
Chamba Rumal

The earliest reported form of the Chamba Rumal was made by Bebe Nanaki, sister of Guru Nanak, in the 16th century, and is preserved in the Gurudwara at Hoshiarpur. The Victoria Albert Museum, London has a rumal that was gifted to the British in 1883 by Raja Gopal Singh. It has an embroidered scene of the Kurukshetra War from the epic Mahabharta. From the 17th century the women of the erstwhile princely state of Chamba (now part of Himachal Pradesh), including members of the royal family, indulged in embroidery of the rumals or handkerchiefs as a part of a marriage gifts or dowry to their daughters.

The handkerchiefs were made in geometrical shapes of square and rectangle using very fine hand made silk which was obtained from the Punjab or muslin cloth, a product of Bengal. Women created highly ornamental patterns using untwined thread made of silk produced in Sialkot (in Pakistan), Amritsar and Ludhiana. The embroidery technique adopted, called the dohara tanka or double satin stitch, created distinct identical patterns on both faces of the fabric, which were attractive when viewed even from distance of 10 ft and more. The dohara tanka method is a heritage of Kashmir, which was adopted in Basohli and Chamba, but was improved upon by adopting themes from the special Mughal art of Chamba miniature paintings; this art form flourished during the 18th and 19th centuries. Following the downfall of the Mughal Empire many expert artists of this craft migrated to the hill region of Himachal Pradesh. Raja Umed Singh of Chamba (1748–68) patronized the artists. These artists drew the outlines of the design on the fabric to be embroidered using fine charcoal and also suggested suitable colours to be adopted on the theological themes of Krishna's raas-leela of the epic Mahabharata, and themes from Ramayana or scenes of marriage and game hunting to be embroidered; themes also included events from Gita Govinda, Bhagvat purana or only Radha-Krishna and Shiva-Parvati. Inspiration was also provided from the frescoes done in the Rang Mahal of Chamba. The women then executed the embroidery. In early 19th century, when Maharaja Ranjit Singh ruled over the Punjab Hill States, Sikh style of painting also influenced the Chamba Rumal.

Following Indian Independence, this art work lost its royal patronage, and quality deteriorated due to commercialization by making many cheaper varieties such as table cloths, cushion covers, clothing, and even various machine made items to compete in the market with cheaper similar work from other regions.

To revive this art work, in the later part of 1970s, at the initiative of Usha Bhagat (a friend of Indira Gandhi), the DCC located the original designs of this art work from museums and collections, and women artists were then trained in this art work. As a result 16 designs have been recreated and quality restored.

The foundation of traditional Chamba Rumal compositions is deeply rooted in the artistic contributions of hereditary Pahari artist families, notably the Gujarati Manikanth family. Master artists such as Prem Lal (b. 1917) and Hans Raj (1958–2019) played a central role in conceptualizing and drawing the intricate master sketches (*rekhaankan*) on cloth—including early practices at the atelier of Master Mangu—as well as executing the fine embroidery itself. The family continues to preserve a rare repository of original historical rumals, master sketches, and traditional design layouts.

Hans Raj played a pivotal role as an artist at Chamba’s Rang Mahal. His contribution spanned the entire process—from sketching on the 'Rumal' and selecting the right colors to supervising the embroiderers to ensure a flawless finished product. During that era, sketches were drawn by hand on *Rumals* ranging from small sizes to as large as 10 to 15 feet, without the use of any printing techniques. Some time ago, certain women received national awards for Chamba Rumal embroidery; the sketches on those specific *Rumals* had been created by Hans Raj.

Mahabharat, Gaddi Gaddan, Shiv Parvati, Radha Krishan, Ganesha etc are some of famous rumal's design by Hans Raj.

Lalita Vakil was awarded the Nari Shakti Puraskar award for her work in helping to revive the art by organising courses. The "2018" award was made in the Presidential Palace by the President of India.

== Process ==
Known as a "needle wonder" Chamba Rumal is now made in square and rectangular shapes. The materials used still consist of muslin, malmal, khaddar (a coarse fabric), fine charcoal or brush, and silk threads without knots. Using a double satin stitch for the embroidery, both faces of the cloth are concurrently stitched by a forward and backward technique to maintain uniformity of design on both faces of the rumal. After completing the embroidery, the fabric is stitched with a border of about 2 to 4 inches on all sides.

== See also ==
- Khadi
- Khādī Development and Village Industries Commission (Khadi Gramodyog)
