= National Handicrafts Award =

National award for handicrafts in India

National Handicrafts Award is an Indian Government award conferred to outstanding master craftspersons in recognition of their outstanding contribution towards development of crafts. The main objective of this award is to give recognition to the outstanding craftspersons in the Handicraft sector. This award is amongst the highest award for the handicrafts artisans of the India.

The award is presented by the President of India, along with Shilp Guru Awards to Master Craftspersons and Sant Kabir Award to master weavers, introduced in 1965.
