= Udai Singh of Chamba =

Ruler of Chamba from 1690 to 1720

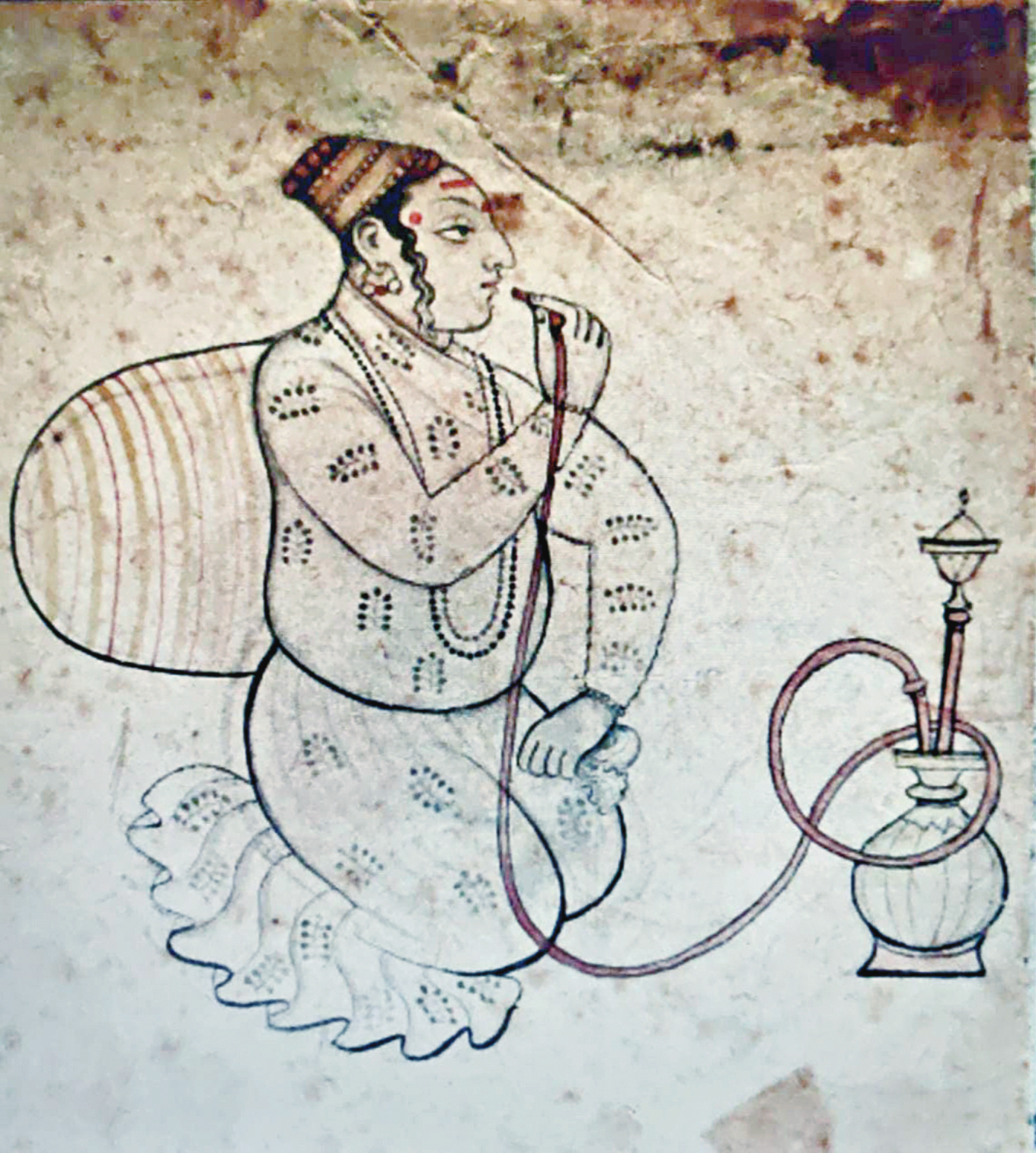
Painting of Raja Udai Singh of Chamba smoking huqqa, c. 1700

Raja Udai Singh (c. 1678 – 1720) was the ruler of the kingdom of Chamba from 1690 until his assassination in 1720. Initially a popular ruler, his reign later declined into decadency. His daughter, Susheel Kaur, is purported to have been married to the Sikh warrior and leader Banda Singh Bahadur.

== Biography ==
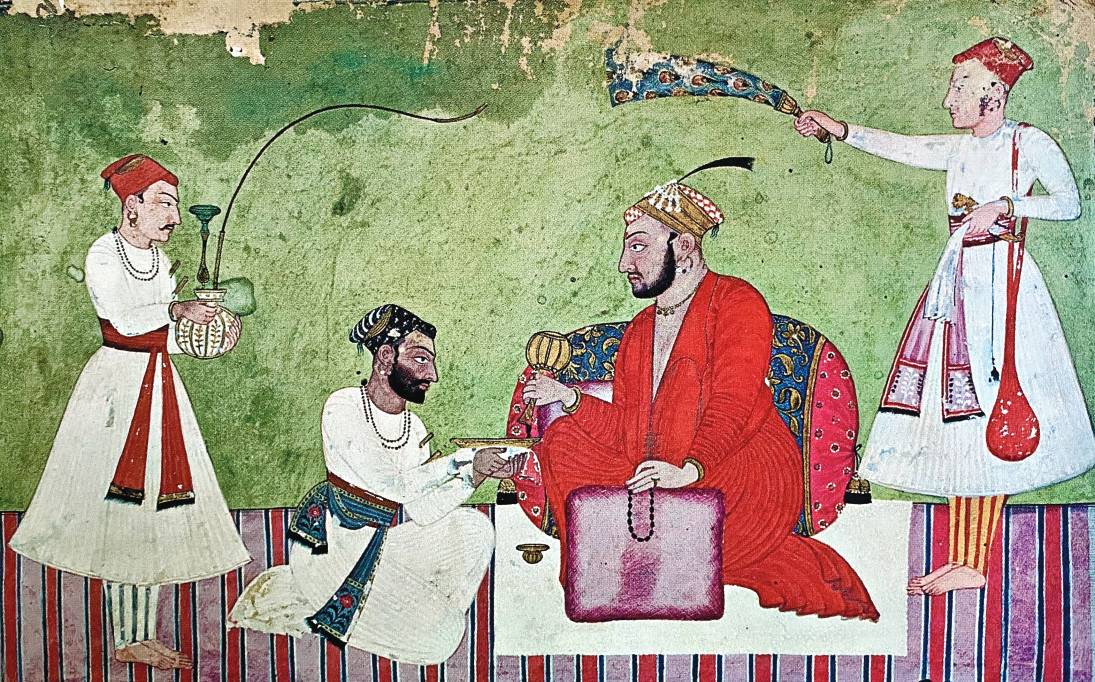
Painting of Raja Udai Singh of Chamba pouring wine from a decanter, c. 1720

Udai Singh was born in around 1678 as the son of Raja Chattar Singh of Chamba. After his father's death, he aceded to the throne of Chamba at a young age in 1690 and his uncle Jai Singh served as his regent and vizier until his death in 1696. When he was young, he was a celebrated ruler but after he grew older, he became indulgent in sensual pleasures and neglected the duties of the state. He had a younger brother named Mian Lakshman Singh, who served as his vizier. As per iconographic evidence in surviving portraits of his forehead mark, he was a worshipper of devi. Udai Singh maintained a large harem and had twenty-two wives, including one who was low-caste. The low-caste woman's father, a barber, was appointed as the new wazir (vizier) by Udai Singh, which upset the ruling establishment. A conspiracy arose to assassinate Udai Singh, with eventually him and his brother Lakshman Singh being slain (who was originally part of the assassination plot but changed sides in favour of his brother out of pity) during a hunting expedition near Udaipur on the bank of the Ravi river in 1720.

== Legacy ==
After Udai Singh's death, his ghost was believed to haunt the Chamba palace, thus the new ruler Raja Ugar Singh built a temple dedicated to Udai Singh near where he was killed to calm the spirit of the late ruler. Furthermore, a new tax namesake of Udai Singh called the tirsera-udaisinghiana-autariana was introduced which existed until the independence of India in 1947. There exists two hero-stones associated with him (one at Udaipur and another at Vamsigopala Temple in Chamba), erected due to him being assassinated, which depict him and his queens, Vishnu, Shesha, and Laxmi. His namesake temple is located in Udaipur.
