= Mask Art of Assam =

Ancient folk art of Assam

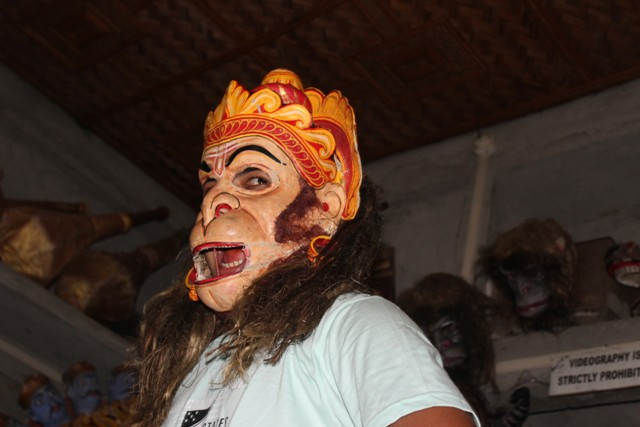
Mukh mukha as worn by an actor

Mask art of Assam is a tradition that has existed in Assam for centuries. It developed in response to Neo-Vaishnavism, initiated by Srimanta Sankardeva in the 16th century. These masks were created for use in Bhaonas (traditional drama of Assam). The art of mask-making was prevalent in Satras; currently, the Samaguri Satra is world-famous for its mask crafts.

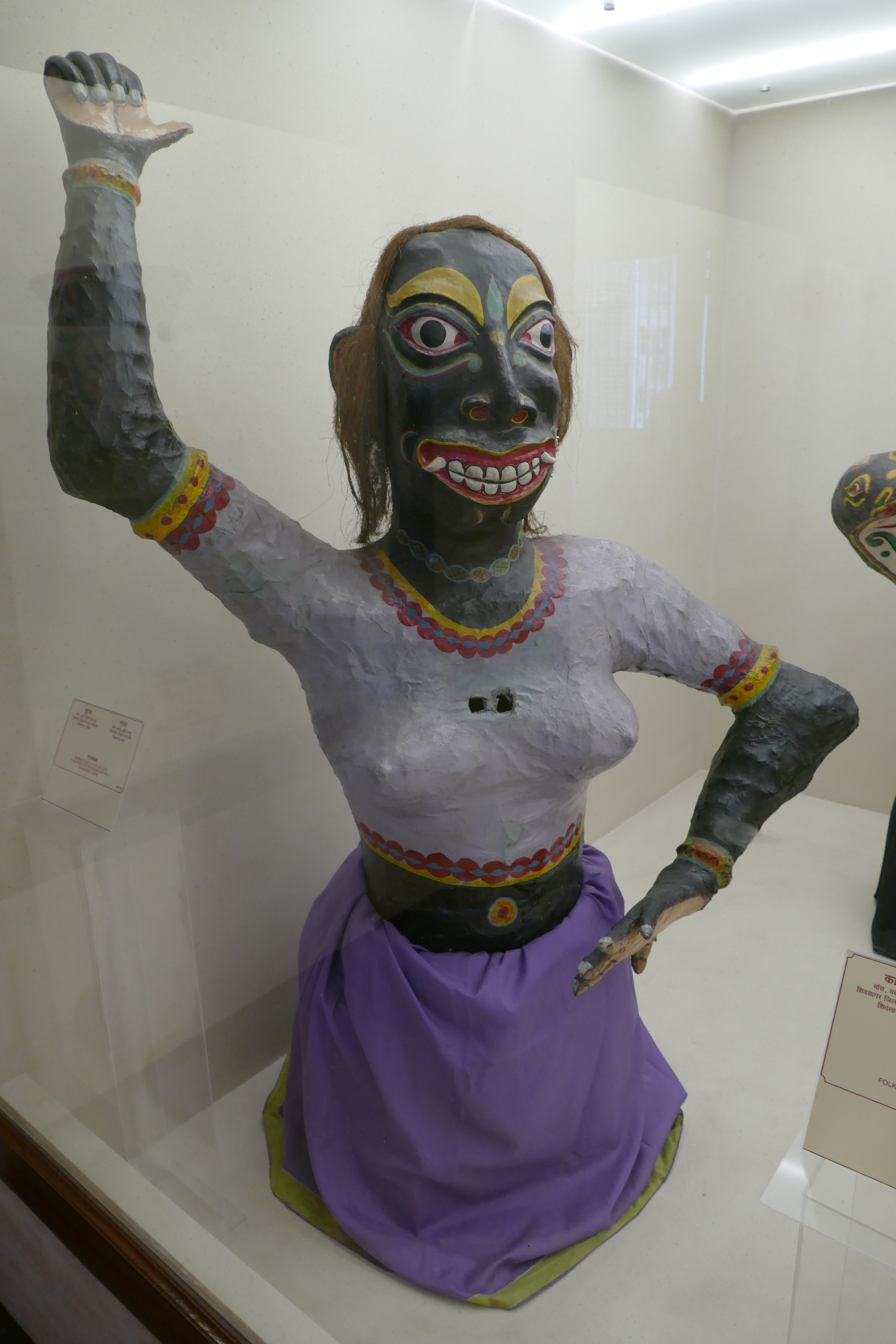
Su-Mukha of a demoness

These masks, or mukha, are of various kinds, such as mukh mukha (mask covering the face), bor mukha (mask and costume covering the whole body), and suti su mukha (smaller than bor mukha but more compact). They are made of biodegradable materials such as bamboo, cane, potter's clay (kumar mati), cow dung, jute fibre, paper, cloth, etc. It usually takes between 10 and 15 days to make one mask. Traditionally, hengul and haital were used for colouring the masks, but due to the unavailability of those materials, watercolours and chemical dyes are now also used. Until recent decades, the masks were stiff and did not allow the actor to portray facial expressions, but innovations introduced by Padma Shri recipient Dr. Hem Chandra Goswami have changed this. Despite its cultural significance, the art is not widely embraced. It is prevalent primarily in Upper Assam, particularly on Majuli island, and has survived in several Satras.

In recognition of its increasing prominence both within India and internationally, the Indian government awarded a Geographical Indication (GI) tag to the art of mask-making in Majuli on 4 March 2024, along with Majuli's traditional manuscript painting practice.
