= Pradip Mukherjee (artist) =

Pradip Mukherjee (born 22 August 1953) is an Indian artist of phad painting, a form of popular folk painting of Rajasthan.

== Life ==
He was born on 22 August 1953 in Jaipur in the famous Mukherjee family of Jaipur. His parents were senior officials in the Indian government. Since childhood, he had been interested in sketching and painting. When he was eleven, he painted a wall painting for a marriage ceremony in Bikaner.

At the age of sixteen, he moved to Jaipur to live with his parents. Unable to adjust there, he moved back to Kolkata for his undergraduate degree. He got his B.Com. from the University of Calcutta.

After graduation, he moved back to Jaipur. He was introduced to Phad painting when his mother got him a painting from her tour to Shahpura. With a desire to pursue fine arts, he took admission to Rajasthan School of Arts, Jaipur. His parents were not happy with this decision and refused to support him financially.

At the college, he saw his colleagues making Phad paintings for sale at Rajasthali, so he started painting Phad paintings as vocation. Due to the superior quality of his work, he became the sole artist responsible for these paintings. In 1974, he made a Phad painting depicting the situation before and after the Emergency. This painting was gifted to Indira Gandhi by Hari Dev Joshi and it brought him into limelight.

The Phad paintings made in Jaipur lacked the vibrancy and aesthetics that was present in the paintings made by Joshi families of Bhilwara and Shahpura. In 1975, Mukherjee went to Bhilwara to learn the nuances of the art-form. The original technique of making Phad paintings had been a closely guarded family secret, and Mukherjee struggled there for two years until Shree Lal Joshi accepted to teach him. In return to this tutoring, Mukherjee vowed that he would not paint the traditional themes, Pabuji and Devnarayan, since this was the sole source of livelihood for the Joshi family.

In 1980-82, he created a series of 108 Phad paintings on Ramcharitmanas. Each of this paintings was 11 in × 8 in (280 mm × 200 mm) and had six to eight panels showing various scenes. This was the first time that elements of miniature painting had been incorporated into Phad painting.

At present, he lives in Udaipur and paints with his student, Shamsher Khan, who has been with him for the past twenty-five years.

== Work ==
Mukherjee's works encompass a variety of themes and subjects. These include subjects from Hindu mythology like Ramcharitramanas, Geet Govind, Durgā Saptshahti, Bhagvad Gita, and Hanuman Chalisa, Kālidāsa's works like Kumārasambhava, Abhijñānaśākuntalam, and Meghadūta, as well as themes from Jain and Buddhist mythologies. He has also painted modern subjects like Agyeya's Sagaramudra.

His paintings on Durga saptashati are displayed at City Palace, Udaipur. His works are also displayed alongside M. F. Husain and Manjit Bawa‘s painting in the VIP lounge at IGI Airport.

== Awards and honours ==
- National Award, 1985
- Shilp Guru, 2008
