= Lalita Vakil =

Indian textile artist

PS Lalita Vakil
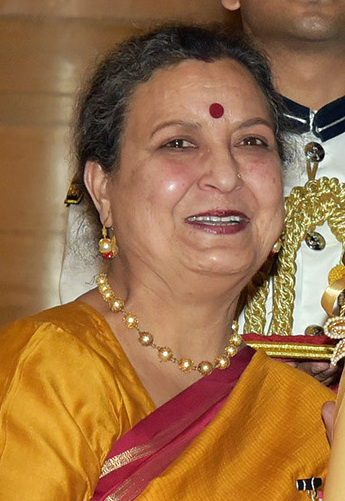
- Vakil in 2022
- Born: Chamba, Himachal Pradesh, India
- Known for: Chamba Rumal embroidery
- Awards: Padma Shri (2022); Nari Shakti Puraskar (2018)

Lalita Vakil is an Indian embroidery artist, known for her contributions to the preservation and promotion of Chamba Rumal, a traditional form of handkerchief embroidery from Chamba district in Himachal Pradesh.

Vakil was awarded the Padma Shri in 2022 by the Government of India for her contributions to the field of arts. She was also honoured with the Nari Shakti Puraskar in 2018.

== Life ==
Vakil was married at the age of fifteen. It was her father-in-law who recognized her talent for creating designs for Chamba Rumal and encouraged her to train local girls and women in this craft.

== Career ==
For the past fifty years, Vakil has been working to promote and preserve Chamba Rumal. She has travelled extensively in India and abroad to exhibit her work and conduct workshops on this traditional form of embroidery.

Vakil has frequently experimented with Chamba Rumal designs. She was the first woman to introduce silk into the embroidery to create larger pieces of the handkerchief. Additionally, she has developed designs for saris, shawls, dupattas, and stoles, as well as multi-panel sets.

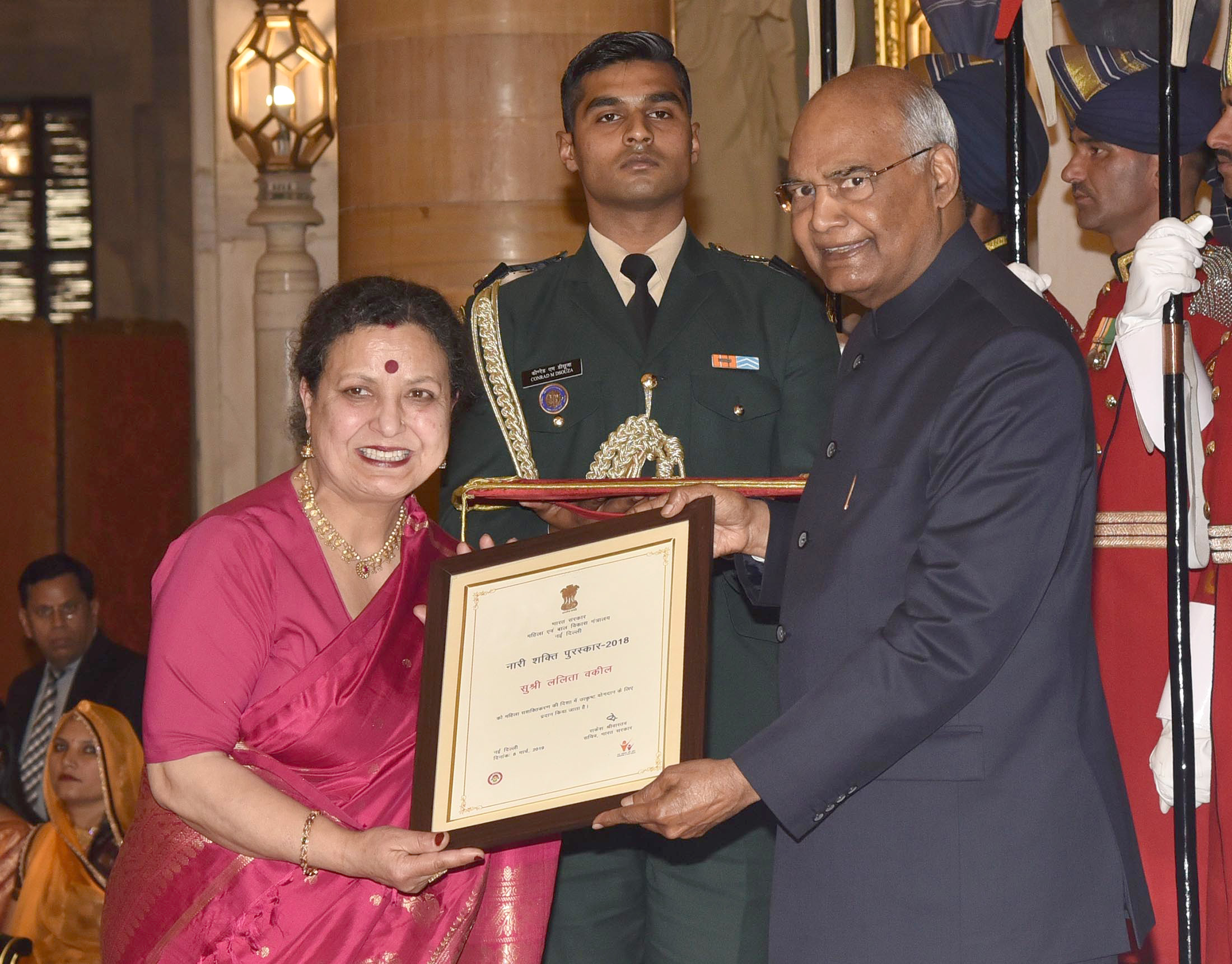
President Ram Nath Kovind presenting the Nari Shakti Puruskar to Chamba Rumal embroiderer Lalita Vakil

== Awards and recognition ==
- 2009: Shilp Guru
- 2017: Nari Shakti Puraskar
- 2022: Padma Shri
