= Arab Cartoon Award =

Cartoon awards in Arab

Arab Cartoon Award جائزة الكاريكاتير العربي
- Sponsored by: The Ministry of Culture, Arts and Heritage of Qatar
- Date: 2012–present
- Country: Qatar
- Website: http://www.arabcartoonaward.com

The Arab Cartoon Award is a Qatari Award conferred to those who made artistic excellence in drawing Cartoon (Caricature) in the Arab World.

Established in 2012, it is sponsored by Ministry of Culture Arts and Heritage of Qatar, Ooredoo communications company, and Dar Al-Sharq for Media publication.
