= Hem Chandra Goswami (artist) =

Indian mask-making artist

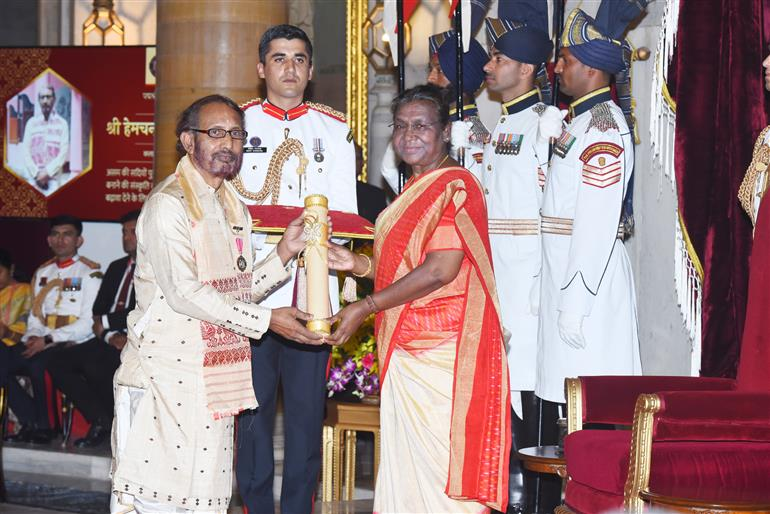
- The President, Smt. Droupadi Murmu presenting the Padma Shri Award to Shri Hem Chandra Goswami at the Civil Investiture Ceremony-I at Rashtrapati Bhavan, in New Delhi on March 22, 2023.
- Born: March 1, 1958 (age 68); Majuli district, Assam, India
- Known for: Artist and mask-maker
- Awards: Padma Shri (2023)

Hem Chandra Goswami (born March 1, 1958) is an Indian mask-making artist from Assam's Majuli district. He received the India's fourth-highest civilian award Padma Shri in 2023 for his contributions in the field of art.

== Early life and career ==
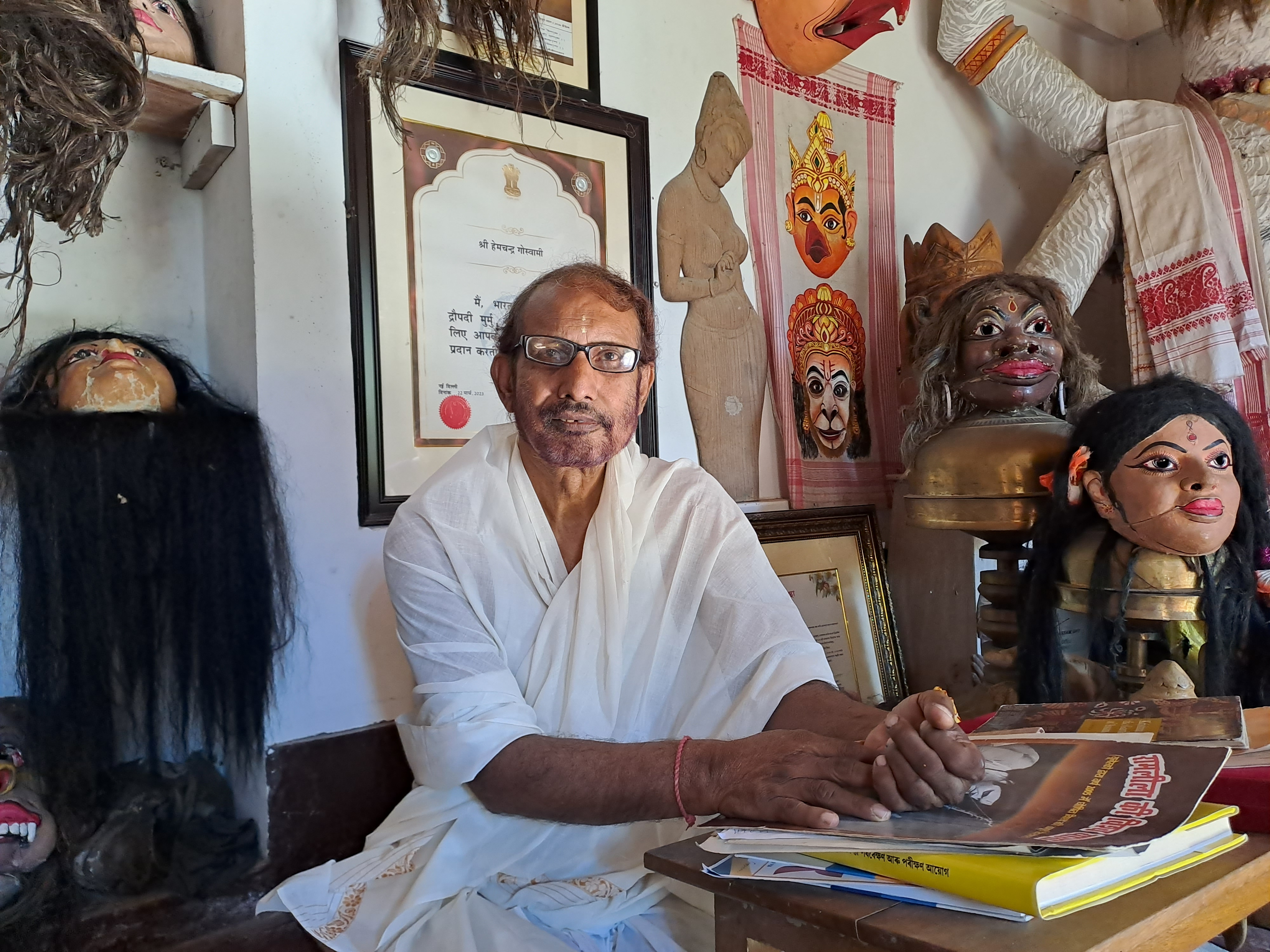
Hem Chandra Goswami in 2023

Goswami was born on March 1, 1958. He completed his HSLC Examination from a local High School and went on to pursue a bachelor's degree in Arts and Crafts from the Arts and Crafts Society of Guwahati, Assam.

At the age of 10, he embarked on his training in the art form established by Srimata Shankardev. Under the guidance of his father, Rudrakanta Deva Goswami, a Sattriya artist and mask maker, he honed his craft from a young age.

Goswami has given lectures about the history of split bamboo masks at various institutions throughout the country, including Dibrugarh University, Tezpur University, Vivekananda Kendra: Guwahati, Indira Gandhi Cultural Centre for the Arts in New Delhi, and Visva-Bharati in Santiniketan.

== Awards and honors ==
- 2023: Awarded the Padma Shri in New Delhi by a President of India, Droupadi Murmu in the field of Art.
- 2022: Achiever Award in Excellence on Art by Pratidin Time, Assam.
- 2019: Sangeet natak academy award
- 2018: Luitporia Lifetime Achievement Award
- 2014: Damodara Deva National Award
- 2012: Received LaMezo Da Anand Award
