= Kaivinai Pokkisham Award =

Kaivinai Pokkisham Award (Living Treasure Craftsman) is an Indian award given to the best senior artisans in the State every year

Candidates include artisans who make Panchaloha idols, bronze lamps and articles, Tanjore paintings and plates, stone carvings, Kalamkari and Battik paintings, paper mache dolls, mat weaving, bamboo and palm articles

Ten artisans older than 65 years of age are selected by a panel. The award comprises Rs 0.1 million, a citation, a certificate and one sovereign gold medal.
