= International TAKIFUJI Art Award =

Art award in Japan

International TAKIFUJI Art Award is an art award for students who belong to the designated art schools.

The applicants are evaluated and screened based on their works produced during their studies, by their supervisors' recommendations, and by judges by the leading figures in Japan art world. Scholarships as "grants for production activities" are given to the winners who are selected by at least one from each school. It is hosted by Japan Traffic Culture Association, a nonprofit organization in Japan, and was established in 1980 as TAKIFUJI Art Award (later changed to International TAKIFUJI Art Award).

== Designated schools ==
- China: Academy of Arts and Design, Tsinghua University
- France: École nationale supérieure des Beaux-Arts
- Germany: Berlin University of the Arts, Stuttgart State Academy of Art and Design
- Japan: Aichi University of the Arts, Hiroshima City University, Joshibi University of Art and Design, Kanazawa College of Art, Kyoto City University of Arts, Kyoto University of Art and Design, Musashino Art University, Nihon University, Okinawa Prefectural University of Arts, Tama Art University, Tohoku University of Art and Design, Tokyo University of the Arts, Tokyo Zokei University
- Korea: Ewha Womans University, Hongik University, Seoul National University
- Singapore: Lasalle College of the Arts
- United Kingdom: University of the Arts London, University of London
- United States: Art Center College of Design, Pratt Institute

== Award winners ==
- Yoshitomo Nara (1984)
- Kenji Yanobe (1988)
- Laurie Maravilla (2014)
