= Shilp Guru =

Indian award

- Award for outstanding contribution to Indian handicrafts
- Awarded for: Indian handicrafts
- Reward: ₹2,00,000
- First award: 2002
- Final award: 2019

The Shilp Guru is the highest honour in the Indian handicrafts sector awarded by Development Commissioner (Handicrafts), Ministry of Textiles, Government of India. It is conferred annually upon 10 master craftspersons who have created an exceptional piece of craft work, showcased highest level of quality and skill in the traditional Indian handicrafts and passed on their skills to the next generation of artisans.

The awards were first introduced in 2002 where 10 eminent master craftspersons were honoured with Shilp Guru (master artisan) title by the President of India. It is presented along with Sant Kabir Awards and National Handicrafts Award to master craftspersons and master weavers, introduced in 1965. Most recent awards were presented on 28 November 2022 by the Vice President of India to 30 master craftspersons for the year 2017, 2018 and 2019. As of 2019, the award consists of ₹2 lakh (equivalent to ₹2.3 lakh or US$2,500 in 2026) prize money, a plaque, a gold coin, a shawl and a certificate.

== Awardees ==
=== 2008 ===
The following is the list of the recipients of the Shilp Guru in 2008.

Name	Craft	State
Pradip Mukherjee	Phad Painting	Rajasthan
Jagdish Prashad	Art Metal Brass Engraving	Delhi
Mohammad Yousuf Bhat	Kani Woven Shawls	Jammu & Kashmir
Gokul Bihari Patnaik	Palm Leaf / Pattachitra	Odisha
Khalil Ahmad	Woollen Punja Durry	Uttar Pradesh
Mahesh Kumar Suman	Wooden Block making	Uttar Pradesh
Brahmdeo Ram Pandit	Pottery	Maharashtra
Machihan Sasa	Pottery	Manipur
Naorem Ongbi Neelamani Deviji	Pottery	Manipur
Rebakanta Mahanta	Wood and Bamboo Mask Making	Assam

=== 2009 ===
The following is the list of the recipients of the Shilp Guru in 2009.

Name	Craft	State
Govind Ram Jhara	Bell Metal Dhokra Casting	Chhattisgarh
Mohammad Ayyub	Wood Carving Block Making	Delhi
Rohit Kantilal Salvi	Patan Patola Double Ikat	Gujarat
Manubhai Chunilal Chitara	Kalamkari Matani Pachedi	Gujarat
Lalita Vakil	Chamba Embroidery	Himachal Pradesh
Ramakant Rupchand Suryawanshi	Bronze Casting	Maharashtra
Kailash Chandra Meher	Tassar Patta Painting	Odisha
Debendra Mishra	Stone Carving	Odisha
Mohammad Shareef	Wood & Bone Carving	Uttar Pradesh
Takdira Begum	Kantha Hand Embroidery	West Bengal

=== 2010 ===
The following is the list of the recipients of the Shilp Guru in 2010.

Name	Craft	State
Omkar Dhawan	Inlay Work on Bone / Wood	Delhi
Budhi Ram Prajapati	Terracotta	Haryana
Ghulam Rasool Khan	Sozni Embroidery	Jammu & Kashmir
Tsering Wangdus	Scroll / Thanka Painting	Leh, Ladakh
Ismail Sulemanji Khatri	Bagh Hand Block Print	Madhya Pradesh
Hari Har Maharana	Stone Carving	Odisha
Nand Kishore Verma	Miniature Painting	Rajasthan
Prabhu Dayal Yadav	Blue Pottery	Rajasthan
Hazi Mohammad Yusuf Dyer	Barik Bundi Bandhej	Rajasthan
Mobeen Husain	Brass Morori Work	Uttar Pradesh

=== 2012 ===
The following is the list of the recipients of the Shilp Guru in 2012.

Name	Craft	State
Har Kishan	Terracotta	Delhi
Kailash Soni	Enamelling on Gold & Silver Jewellery	Rajasthan
O. P. Malhotra	Shawl as Artware	Himachal Pradesh
Rasheed Ahmed Quadri	Bidriware	Karnataka
T. Venkatesa Raja	Thanjavur Painting	Tamil Nadu
Saila Moharana	Pattachitra	Odisha
Dhruba Sil	Wood Carving	West Bengal
Krishna Das Paul	Cane & Bamboo	Tripura

=== 2013 ===
The following is the list of the recipients of the Shilp Guru in 2013.

Name	Craft	State
Bhasar Bhura Khoyala	Leather work	Gujarat
Abdul Aziz Bazaz	Walnut Wood Carving	Jammu & Kashmir
Anita Choudapurkar	Kasuti Embroidery	Karnataka
Prabha Mallesh	Mysore style	Karnataka
Dina Bandhu Mohapatra	Palmleaf & Pattachitra Painting	Odisha
Kova Naneshwar	Brass Dokra Craft	Telangana
Reva Shankar Sharma	Miniature Painting	Rajasthan
Rafiquddin	Marble Inlay	Uttar Pradesh

=== 2014 ===
The following is the list of the recipients of the Shilp Guru in 2014.

Name	Craft	State
Banamali Mahapatra	Pattachitra Painting	Odisha
Hema Shekar	Tie & Dye and Batik painting	Karnataka
Kailash Chand Sharma	Miniature Painting	Rajasthan
Ram Swaroop Sharma	Wire inlay and wood inlay	Rajasthan
Badshah Miyan	Tie & Dye Lehariya with Natural Herbal	Rajasthan

=== 2015 ===
The following is the list of the recipients of the Shilp Guru in 2015.

Name	Craft	State
Khande Kullayappa	Leather Puppets	Andhra Pradesh
K. Siva Prasada Reddy	Kalamkari Painting	Andhra Pradesh
Irshad Hussain Farooqi	Calligraphy in wood carving	Delhi
Rajender Parshad Bondwal	Sandal Wood Carving	Haryana
Khatri Abdul Razak Mohmed	Ajrakh Hand Block Printing	Gujarat
Abdul Raouf	Bidri Craft	Karnataka
Girish Kumar Rajsoni	Thewa Craft	Rajasthan
Pravakar Maharana	Stone Carving	Odisha
Inder Singh Kudrat	Enamel of silver & Gold jewellery	Rajasthan
Hari Charan Das	Cane & Bamboo	Tripura

=== 2016 ===
The following is the list of the recipients of the Shilp Guru in 2016.

Name	Craft	State
Mohd. Matloob	Mugal Wood Carving, Engraving and Inlay	Delhi
Gulam Hyder Mirza	Paper Machie	J & K
Kalpataru Maharana	Stone Carving	Odisha
Rupan Matharu	Plastic Inlay on Wood	Punjab
Gopal Saini	Blue Pottery	Rajasthan
Arjun Prajapati	Terracotta	Rajasthan
Babu Lal Marotia	Miniature Painting	Rajasthan
Tripti Mukherjee	Kantha Hand Embroidery	West Bengal

=== 2017 ===
The following is the list of the recipients of the Shilp Guru in 2017.

Name	Craft	State
Vinod Kumar Jangir	Sandal wood carving	Rajasthan
Dilshad Hussain	Brass Engraving	Uttar Pradesh
V. K. Munuswamy	Terracotta	Puducherry
Zahiruddin	Khurja Blue Pottery	Uttar Pradesh
Tapan Chakraborty	Palm leaf engraving	West Bengal
Noorbanu Mohamad Khatri	Bandhani, Tie-Dye	Gujarat
K. R. Mohanan	Wood Carving	Kerala
Amita Sachdeva	Stone Dust Painting	Delhi
Mohan Lal Soni	Miniature Painting	Rajasthan
Mohammed Yusuf Khatri	Hand Block Bagh print	Madhya Pradesh

=== 2018 ===
The following is the list of the recipients of the Shilp Guru in 2018.

Name	Craft	State
Bijay Kumar Parida	Palm leaf engraving	Odisha
Maheswar Parida	Stone Carving	Odisha
Kondra Gangadhar	Stone Carving	Andhra Pradesh
Ashish Malakar	Sholapith	West Bengal
Chanchal Chakravarty	Metal	Delhi
Gopal Prasad Sharma	Miniature Painting	Rajasthan
Abdul Hasib	Bone Carving	Delhi
Bashir Ahmed Bhat	Sozni Hand Embroidery	Jammu & Kashmir
Gurumayum Shanti Devi	Artistic Textiles	Manipur
Mahamaya Sikdar	Kantha Hand Embroidery	West Bengal

=== 2019 ===
The following is the list of the recipients of the Shilp Guru in 2019.

Name	Craft	State
Velayudham Sreenvasulu Reddy	Kalamkari Hand Painting	Andhra Pradesh
Suman Sonthalia	Warli Art	Delhi
Chitara Chandrakant Bhulabhai	Mata Ni Pachedi Kalamkari	Gujarat
Iqbal Hussain Khan	Papier-mâché	Jammu & Kashmir
M. Ramamurthy	Wood Carving	Karnataka
Mohan Lal Sharma	Brass wire inlay on Sheeshem Wood Tarkashi	Rajasthan
Asharam Meghawal	Miniature Painting	Rajasthan
V. Panneer Selvam	Tanjore Painting	Tamil Nadu
Chiranji Lal Yadav	Brass Engraving	Uttar Pradesh
Naseem Bano	Chikan Hand Embroidery	Uttar Pradesh
