= Sant Kabir Award =

Indian award

Sant Kabir Award is an Indian Government award conferred to outstanding weavers who have made valuable contribution in keeping alive the handloom heritage. It was established for dedication in building up linkages between the past, present and future through dissemination of knowledge on traditional skills and designs by Ministry of Textiles, Government of India. The award was christened in the memory of sant Kabir, a 15th-century mystic poet and sant of India.

The award is presented by the President of India, along with Shilp Guru Awards and National Awards to Master Craftspersons and master weavers, introduced in 1965.

== Overview ==
Every year, two stages of selection process will be constituted to finalize the winning entry. First stage of selection will be done at the level of respective Zonal Directors. Final selection will be done by Apex selection committee of Development Commissioner(Handlooms). Award consists of one mounted gold coin, one shawl and a citation. In addition to this, Rs 6 lakh financial assistance will also be given to encourage and create 10 new products of high level of excellence, high aesthetic value and high quality in duration of one year.

The Minister of Home Affairs, Government of India also gives the "Kabir Puruskar" started in 1990, for acts of courage during communal riots and ethnic clashes.
