= Chamba State =

Princely state in present-day Republic of India

Coordinates: 32°34′12″N 76°7′48″E

Chamba State चम्बा रियासत
- 500s–1948
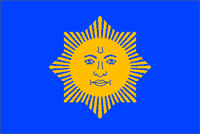
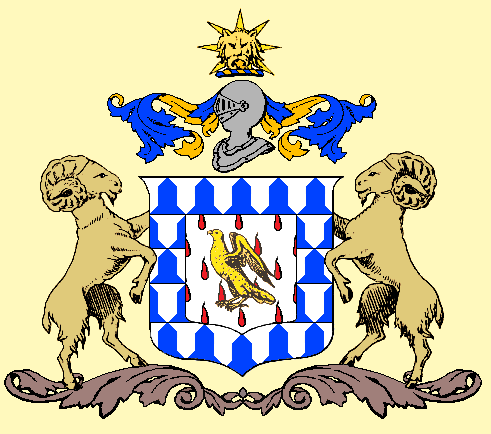
- Flag Coat of arms

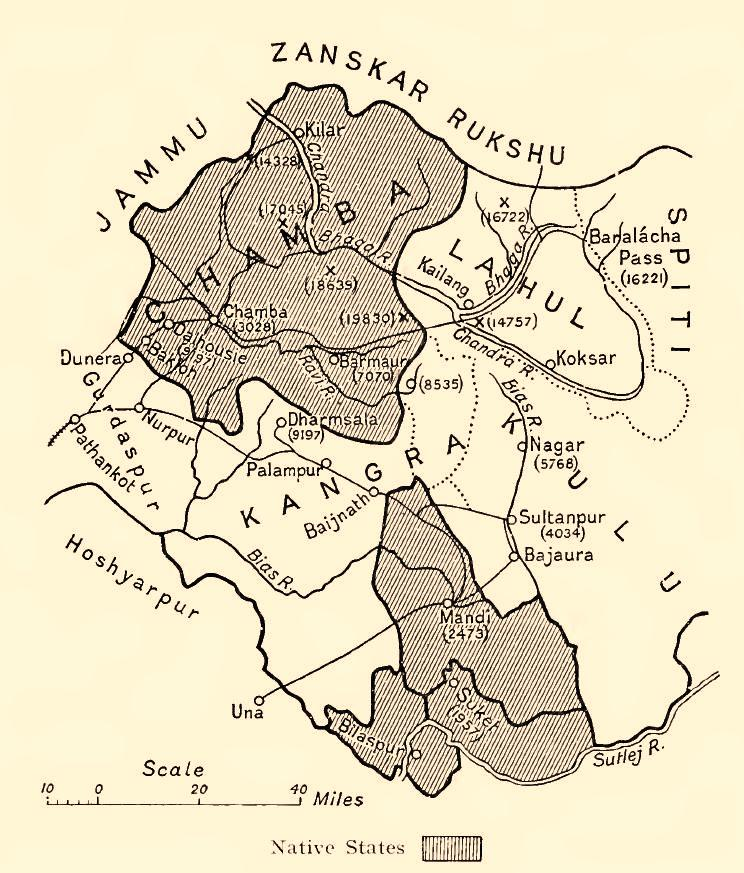
- 1911 map of the Princely States of the Shimla Hills showing the boundaries of Chamba State.
- Capital: Bharmour (580-920) and Chamba (920-1948)
- History
  - Established: 500s
  - Accession to the Indian Union: 1948

Area
- 1892: 8,329 km^{2} (3,216 sq mi)

Population
  - 1892: 115,773
Succeeded by
India
- Today part of: Himachal Pradesh, India
- Chamba Princely State

Chamba State was one of the oldest princely states in present-day Republic of India, having been founded during the late 6th century. It was part of the States of the Punjab Hills of the Punjab Province in India from 1859 to 1947. Its last ruler signed the instrument of accession to the Indian Union on 15 April 1948.

== Etymology ==
The name Chamba may be derived from Champavati, the name of the daughter of Raja Sahila Varman in the 10th century CE.

== Location and area ==
The polity bordered Jammu and Kashmir to the north and west, Ladakh, Lahoul, and Bara Banghal to the east, and the directly British-controlled districts of Kangra and Gurdaspur to the south. The territory of the former state consisted of 12,073 km² with the capital at the eponymous settlement of Chamba, believed to have been founded by the ruler Raja Sahil Varman. Its former territory now falls in the modern day Indian state of Himachal Pradesh.

== History ==
=== Origin ===
The polity was ruled by the Chamial (Chambial) clan. The polity was one of the oldest in the Indian subcontinent, claiming to originate in the sixth century CE, with the dynasty maintaining their own Vansavali (traditional genealogy) and references existing in the Rajatarangini. The dynasty claims Surajvansi Rajput descent and that they originated from Ayodhya. The first named figure tied to the polity is King Maru (fl. middle of the sixth century), a claimed descendant of Vishnu, through Rama and then through Kush, who left Ayodhya for his elder brother and shifted to Kashmir with his two sons, with the elder son settling in Punjab and the younger settling in Brahmaur (or Brahmapura). Some wooden temples in Brahmaur and Chatradi are attributed to the period of Maru in the seventh century CE.

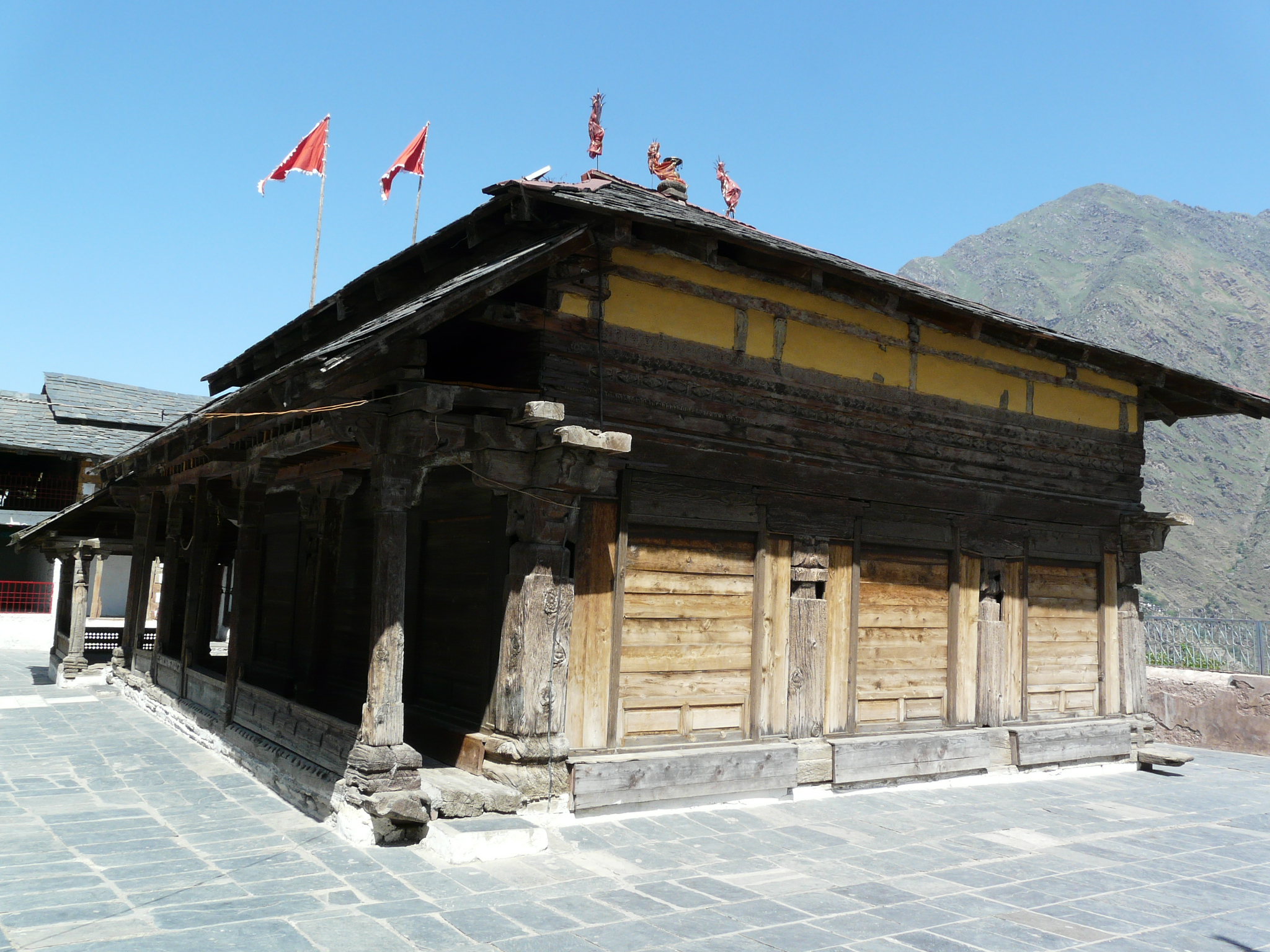
The Shivshakti temple, also known as the Shakti Devi temple, is a late 7th century Hindu goddess temple in Chhatrari village east of Chamba, Himachal Pradesh. It is one of the oldest surviving Hindu temples in Himachal Pradesh based on an inscription found in village Gum that mentions this temple and king Meruvarman. The inscription calls the Chatrari village as Sivapura, and tradition also calls this temple as the Shivshakti mandir.

According to tradition, the ancient name of Chamba was Champa, and its predecessor state was known as Brahmpur. This site later became Bharmour around 550 AD when Raja Maru Verman came from Kalpagram to the Chamba Hills. An early ruler named Meru Varman expanded the territory of the state mostly at the expense of the rival polity of Kullu, which was ruled by Raja Dateshwar Pal whom was defeated in a conflict, leading to Kullu being dominated by Chamba for six generations after. Later during the reign of the Chamba ruler Lakshmi Varma, Kullu's independence from Chamba was restored due to assistance by the polity of Bushahr. Lakshmi's successor and son Mushan Varman (which has a legend regarding his birth involving being left in a cave as a baby and being guarded by mice hence his name Mushan) married the daughter of the Raja of Suket, which brought them into a military alliance which allowed Mushan to come to power.

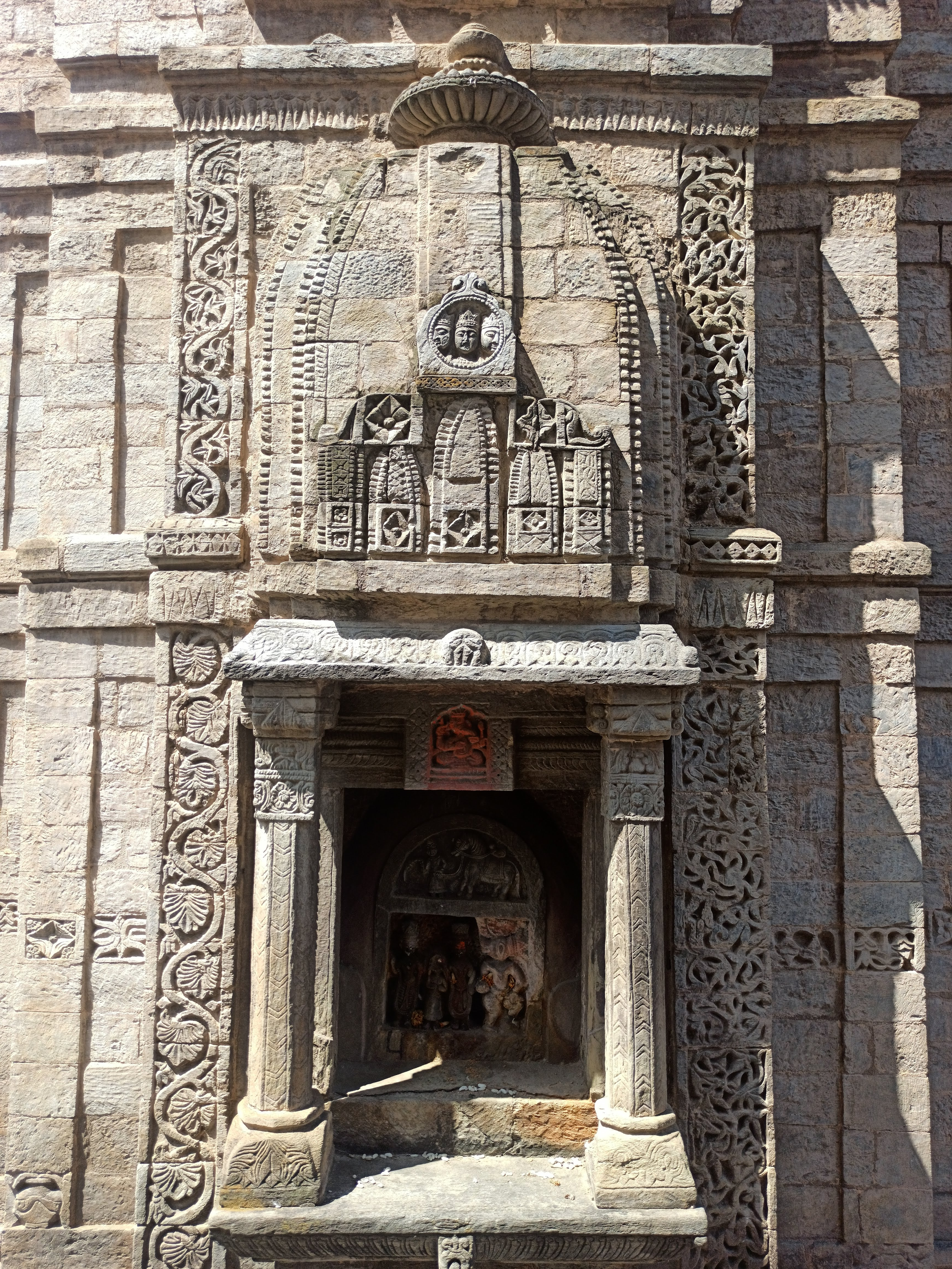
A Temple Niche from the Lakshmi Narayan Temple, Chamba

Raja Shahil Verman (Sahila Varman), flourishing in around 920 CE, shifted his capital from Bharmaur to present-day Chamba due to the warmer climate. According to lore, the plateau which the settlement of Chamba exists was chanced upon by princess Champavati, daughter of Sahila Varman, who asked her father to build a settlement at the location. Sahila Varman is credited with building Hindu temples, such as the Chamasni temple. It is believed that King Shahil Varman ruled until 940 AD. From then onwards the State of Chamba continued to be ruled by different kings of the Mushana Rajput Dynasty from their capital at Champavati, which later came to be known as Chamba. The younger brother of the Chamba ruler Vichitar Varman is believed to have been the founder of the polity of Bandralta. Bappika, the younger sister of the Chamba ruler Asta Varman was married to the Kashmiri ruler Harsha. The Chamba ruler Vijaya Varman took advantage of the political uncertainty and turmoil in northwestern India in the late 12th century and expanded Chamba's territory further by annexing lands of neighbouring states. The ruler Ganesa Varman (r. 1512–1559) built the fortress of Ganeshgarh. His successor and son Pratap Singh Varman came into conflict with Kangra and occupied Guler.

=== Mughal period ===
However, owing to relative isolation of Chamba, aspects of its culture were able to survive and continue without major disruption by invading elements comparatively when compared to other areas of the subcontinent. Thus, there was less influence from the Mughals in the state, with Raja Janardan of Chamba nominally accepting the suzerainty of Mughal emperor Jahangir. However, the polity did come into conflict with other, rival mountaine polities, such as Basohli, Nurpur, and Kangra.

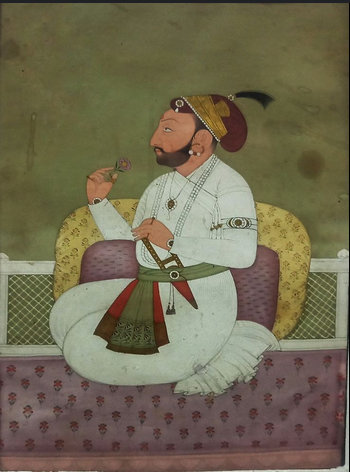
Portrait of Raja Prithvi Singh of Chamba, Bhuri Singh Museum

The first ruler of Chamba that there exists more detailed historical information for is Raja Balabhadra Varman (r. 1589–1641). His son and successor Janardan Singh was the first to accept Mughal overlordhip under Jahangir, and was assassinated in around 1623 by Raja Jagat Singh of Nurpur and Chamba came to be subjugated under Nurpur for a period of twenty years as a result. However, the son of Janardan Singh named Prithvi Singh returned from Mandi and expelled the Nurpuri occupiers with the assistance of the polities of Mandi and Suket, restoring the autonomy of Chamba. Prithvi Singh formed a further alliance with Prince Sangram Pal of Basohli with a marital alliance by offering his daughter to the Basohli ruler. A celebrated ruler, Prithvi Singh is attributed as being the constructor of the Brahmaur Kothi structure.

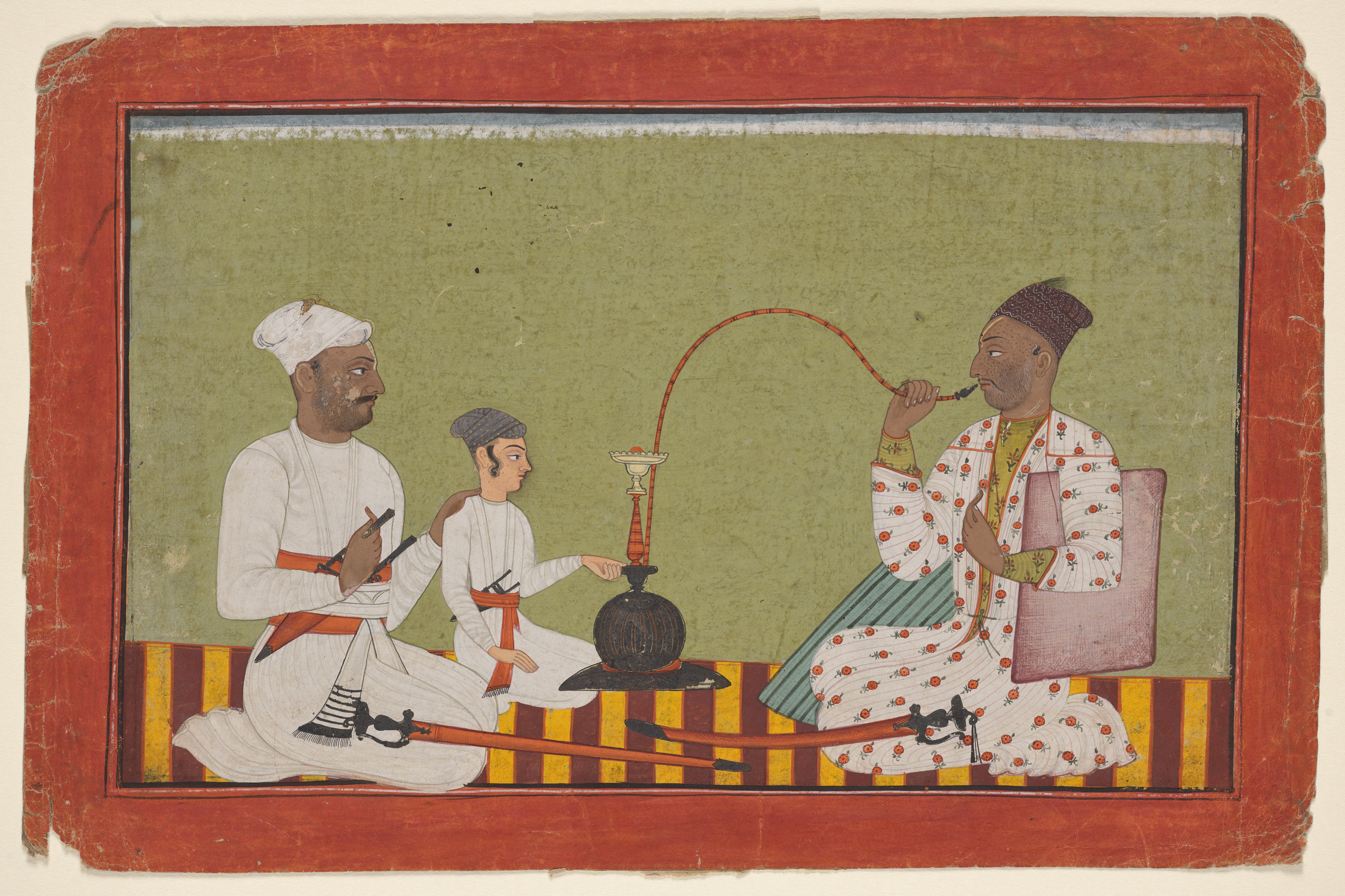
Posthumous painting of Raja Chattar Singh of Chamba smoking huqqa with his brother Jai Singh and son Udai Singh, c. 1700

The 17th and 18th century saw the reign of Chattar Singh, his son Udai Singh, and then Ugar Singh. Chattar Singh, along with his younger brother Jai Singh who served as his wazir, resisted the expanding Mughal Empire, with Chamba being assisted by Basohli and Guler. In 1580, the southern province of Chamba named Rihlu was conquered by the Mughals. Chattar Singh invaded Basohli and founded the settlement of Chatargarh, also Lahaul was divided between Chamba and Kulu. Aurangzeb ordered Chattar Singh to destroy the Hindu temples in his territory, which he refused to do and instead gilded them. In 1690, a coalition of hill polities including Chamba repelled a Mughal attack led by Mirza Reiza Beg.

After the death of Chattar Singh in 1690, his brother and uncle of his son Jai Singh served as the regent and vizier on behalf of the young Udai Singh, until Jai Singh died in 1696. Initially a popular and successful ruler owing to his uncle's influence, Udai Singh later became a decadent ruler leading to the decline of the polity and garnered controversy by appointing a low-caste barber who was the father of his lover to the post of wazir. Udai Singh and Ugar Singh (cousin of Udai Singh who had militarily served Dhruv Dev of Jammu) were killed due to them falling out of favour with their officials. Due to this, they both died without issue and hero-stones were commissioned to commemorate them.

The deposed and murdered Ugar Singh was succeeded by Dalel Singh in 1735 (whom was married to a Jammu princess and resided at Jammu before coming to power, at one point being banished to by Dhruv Dev to Lahore Fort under the watch of Zakaria Khan, who later released him and provided assistance to bring Dalel to power in Chamba), who was the eldest son of Raghunath Singh, whom had been the younger brother of Raja Chattar Singh. Dalel Singh sent the two sons of the former ruler Ugar Singh, named Umed Singh and Sher Singh, to Zakaria Khan in Lahore to be held by him as political prisoners to enact Mughal influence over Chamba. Mir Mannu who succeeded Zakaria Khan as governor of the Mughal province of Lahore believed that Umed Singh coming to power would suit Mughal interests (as he had received a Mughal education) and Umed Singh was sent to Chamba with Mughal military assistance to force the abdication of Dalel Singh and the accession of Umed Singh.

=== Conflicts with other hill kingdoms in the second half of the 18th century ===
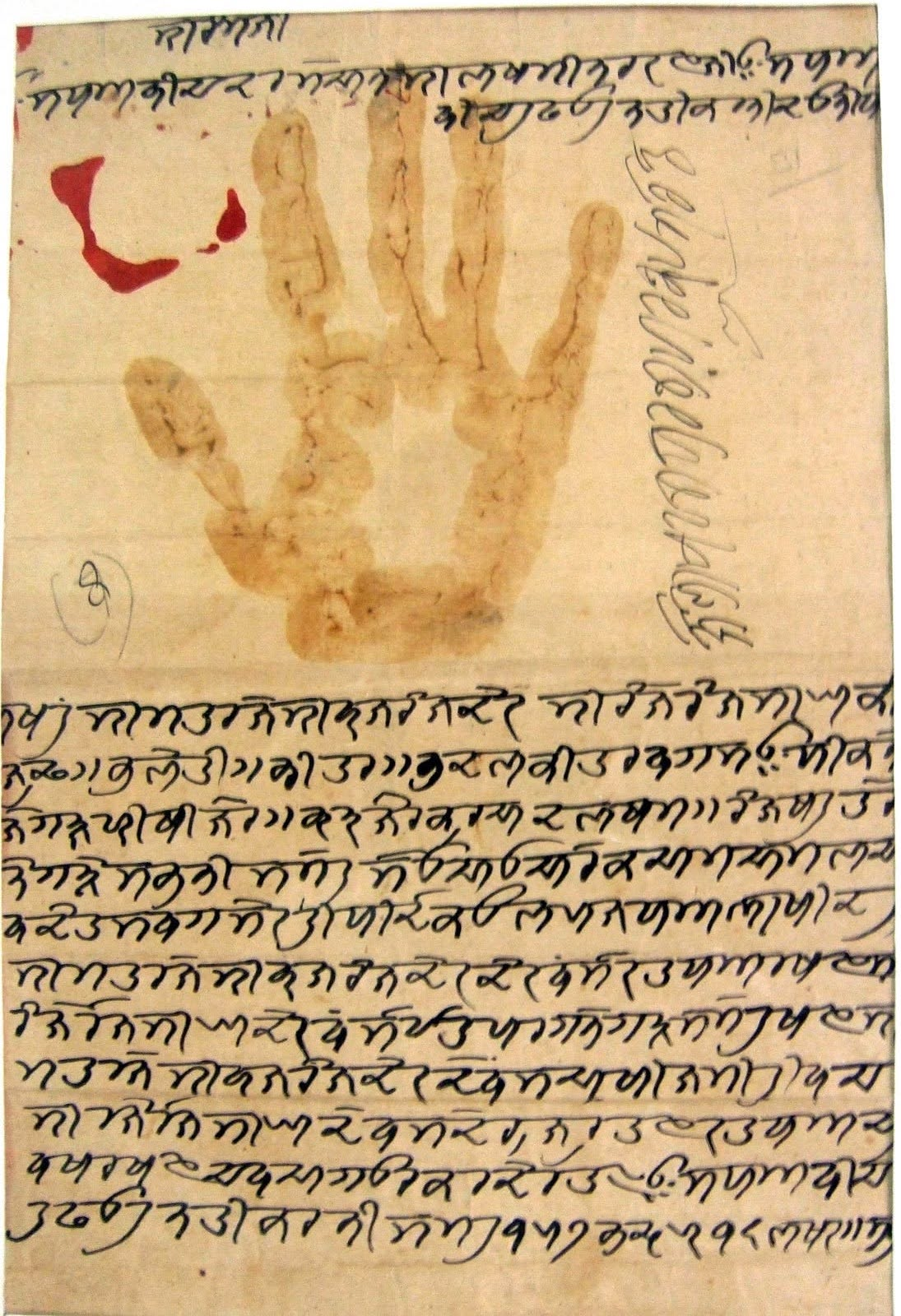
Sanad written in Takri script from Raja Braj Dev of Jammu to Raja Raj Singh of Chamba restoring him the parganas of Jundh, Bhalei, Diur, Bhandal and Kihar, 1783

In 1748, Dalel Singh abdicated the throne, becoming a hermit, and was succeeded by Umed Singh. Umed Singh was married to the sister of Raja Ranjit Dev of Jammu. Umed Singh was able to successfully defend his state against attacks from Kangra and Basohli. Umed Singh regained possession of the lost southern province of Rihlu in 1750 which had been annexed by the Mughals. The construction of the Akhand Chandi section of the Chamba palace and the foundation of the Rang Mahal palace is attributed to him. Umed's successor and son Raj Singh came to power as a child in 1764, thus his mother served as regent on his behalf until he came of age. However, his mother was originally from Jammu and thus Chamba came under the influence of Raja Ranjit Dev of Jammu. When Raj Singh gained full authority, he imprisoned the wazir of the state, which was seen as enacting the influence of Jammu. The ruler of Jammu responded to this action by ordering Prince Amrit Pal of Basohli to attack Chamba, with initial success for three months but by late 1774, Chamba overcame Basohli and obtained a compensation of one lakh rupees. During Raj Singh's reign, the polities of Banghal (1778), Bhadharwah (1783 as an autonomous polity within Chamba, fully annexed in 1820, with the younger brother of Chamba being placed on its vacant gaddi in 1833), and Kishtwar (1785) were annexed, leading Chamba to eclipse its rival Jammu as the powerhouse in the region. However, Raja Raj Singh of Chamba was killed during a conflict with Raja Sansar Chand of Kangra. The next ruler Jit Singh made peace via a treaty with Kangra and invaded Basohli, with him acquiring a plunder as a result. The next ruler Charat Singh was the brother in law of Bir Singh of Nurpur.

=== Nepali and Sikh subjugation ===
During the reigns of the Chamba rulers Charat Singh and Shri Singh (or Sri Singh) with polity dealt with external incursions and domination by the Nepalis and Sikhs. The Sikhs initially invaded Chamba during the reign of Shri Singh but immediately retreated. Between 1809 and 1846, Chamba was a tributary of the Sikh Empire and came under the Kangra Hills province of the Lahore Darbar. After the First Anglo-Sikh War, the British gained a large amount of land from the Sikh Empire through the Treaty of Lahore. This treaty gave the British all land between the Sutlej and Beas rivers, along with several hilly areas, including Kashmir and Hazara, as part of the payment for war expenses. Later in 1846, by the Treaty of Amritsar, the British sold Kashmir, Hazara, including Chamba to Raja Gulab Singh of Jammu for a payment of 75 lakh rupees. However, questions came up about whether the entire Chamba region, on both sides of the Ravi River, was meant to go to Gulab Singh. At that time, he already controlled Lakhanpur, which the British had actually taken under the Treaty of Lahore. At the same time, the Raja of Chamba said that the Bhadrawah area rightfully belonged to him, since it had been granted to him earlier by Maharaja Ranjit Singh,But it was now under gulab singh's control. The Raja of Chamba, who had earlier paid tribute to the Sikh empire, also did not want to become a subject of Gulab Singh. By Treaty of Amritsar Chamba was initially intended to be incorporated into Jammu territory. However, this outcome was averted due to the timely intervention of Wazir Bhaga, who travelled to Lahore and presented Chamba's case to Sir Henry Lawrence. in 1847 With Lawrence's support, Chamba retained its autonomy, though Bhadrawah was ceded to the polity of Jammu and Kashmir.

=== British period ===
This settlement clarified the status of Chamba as a princely state under British protection, separate from Kashmir and Lahore. The territory had a British Resident assigned to it, who resided at the government rest house near Chowgan park, with the palace of the ruling dynasty also located nearby. Despite Chamba supporting the British during the 1857 rebellion, relations with the British remained poor. In 1863, the administration of Chamba deteriorated to a state that required direct British intervention, with Colonel Blair Reed being appointed as Superintendent of Chamba to oversee the state's function with the decline of the native ruling dynasty following. There was a succession dispute following the death of Raja Shri Singh in 1870 between his sons Gopal Singh and Suchet Singh. Gopal Singh ultimately succeeded as the new ruler and Suchet Singh was exiled to London, with his death following in 1896. Due to the precarious situation the royal family found itself in due to these controversies, Gopal Singh had a short reign and abdicated in 1873, being succeeded by his young son Shyam Singh who was installed as the new ruler by the British, with the eventual full annexation of Chamba to British India being expected to occur in the near future. Due to difficulties experienced working with British officials, Shyam Singh abdicated 1904 and was succeeded by his younger brother Mian Buri Singh.

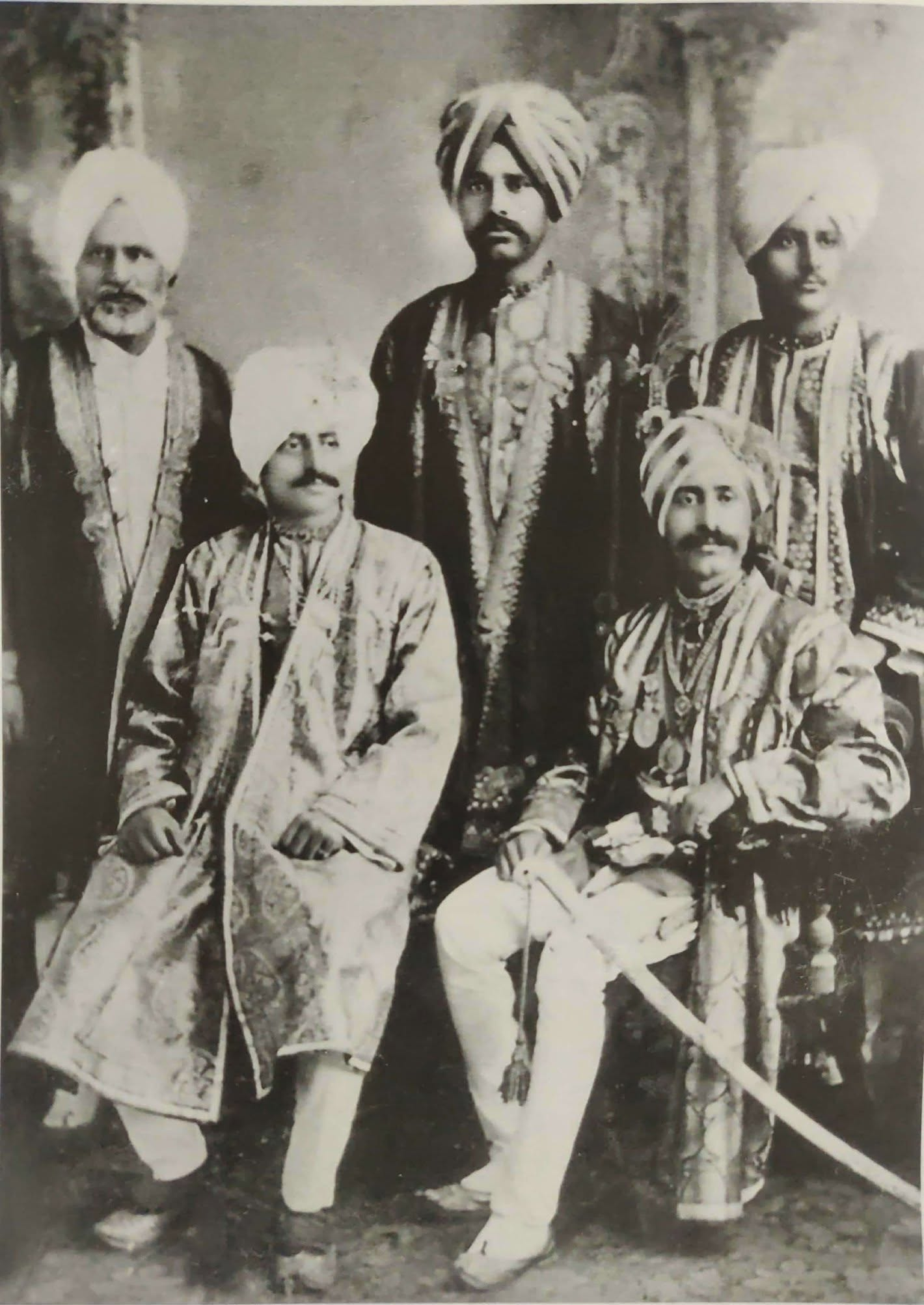
Photograph of Raja Sham Singh of Chamba with his younger brother Mian Bhuri Singh

Buri Singh was a more capable ruler, garnering favourable relations with the British while also establishing more sovereignty from them. He supported the British war effort during the First World War and was rewarded with the Knight Commander class of the Order of the Star of India (KCSI). Buri Singh donated his familial art collection to the namesake Bhuri Singh Museum, Chamba. Buri was succeeded in 1919 by his son Ram Singh who in turn was succeeded in 1935 by Lakshman Singh. Lakshman Singh was a celebrated ruler of the state, he had received a formal education and came of age in 1945 but a couple of years later the partition and independence of India occurred in 1947. Lakshman Singh signed the instrument of accession to India on 15 April 1948. As a result, he received a privy purse consisting of 138,000 rupees.

=== Present ===
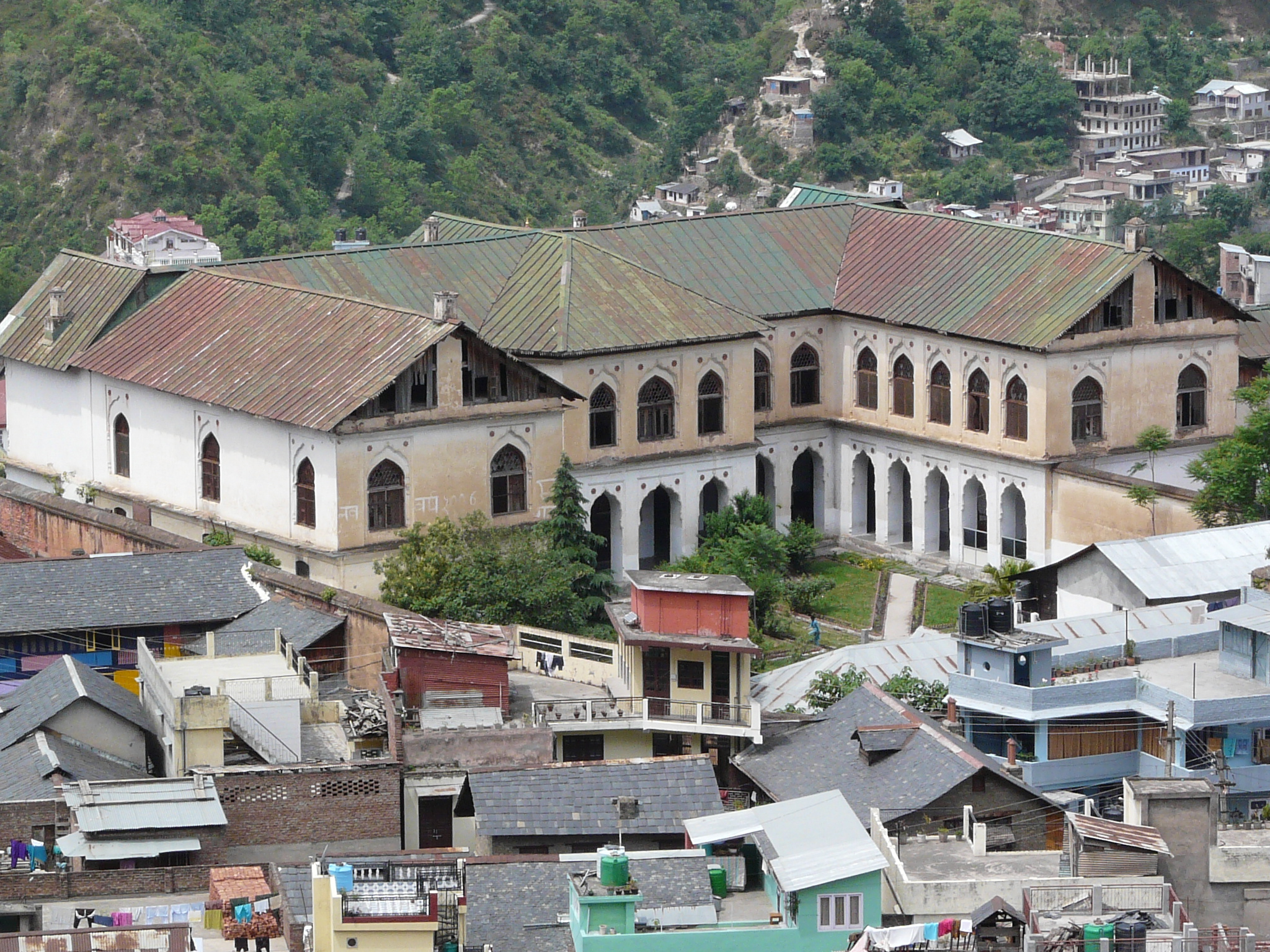
The Akhand Chandi palace in Chamba town. This erstwhile palace of the rulers of Chamba state is presently used as a government college.

After joining India, the last raja tried to maintain a sense of structure of his former state despite the central government in New Delhi, however he died from a heart attack on 20 May 1971 while on a train returning from the Indian capital. His wife Devindra Kumari politically served as the Member of the Legislative Assembly of Chamba from 1962 to 1967 and orchestrated charitable activities in the former state, such as the founding of the Mahila Mandal in 1957 and being the chairwoman of the Social Welfare Board of Himachal Pradesh in 1981. After the death of Lakshman Singh in 1971, his son Prem Singh was declared the new titular raja but the Central Indian government under Indira Gandhi did not recognize him, as they wished to do away with the influence of former royals. Despite this, Prem Singh legally challenged the lack of recognition, which led him to being one of the last Indian royals to be officially recognized by the Indian government. In 1974, he married the daughter of the Raja of Dharampur, Divya Devi. The couple have two children, Beejakshri Dei (b. 12 May 1975) and Sahil Varman (b. 24 July 1989, current tikka). The descendants of the dynasty now occupy a small part of the former Chamba palace complex. The current titular raja now resides mostly in New Delhi.

== List of rulers ==
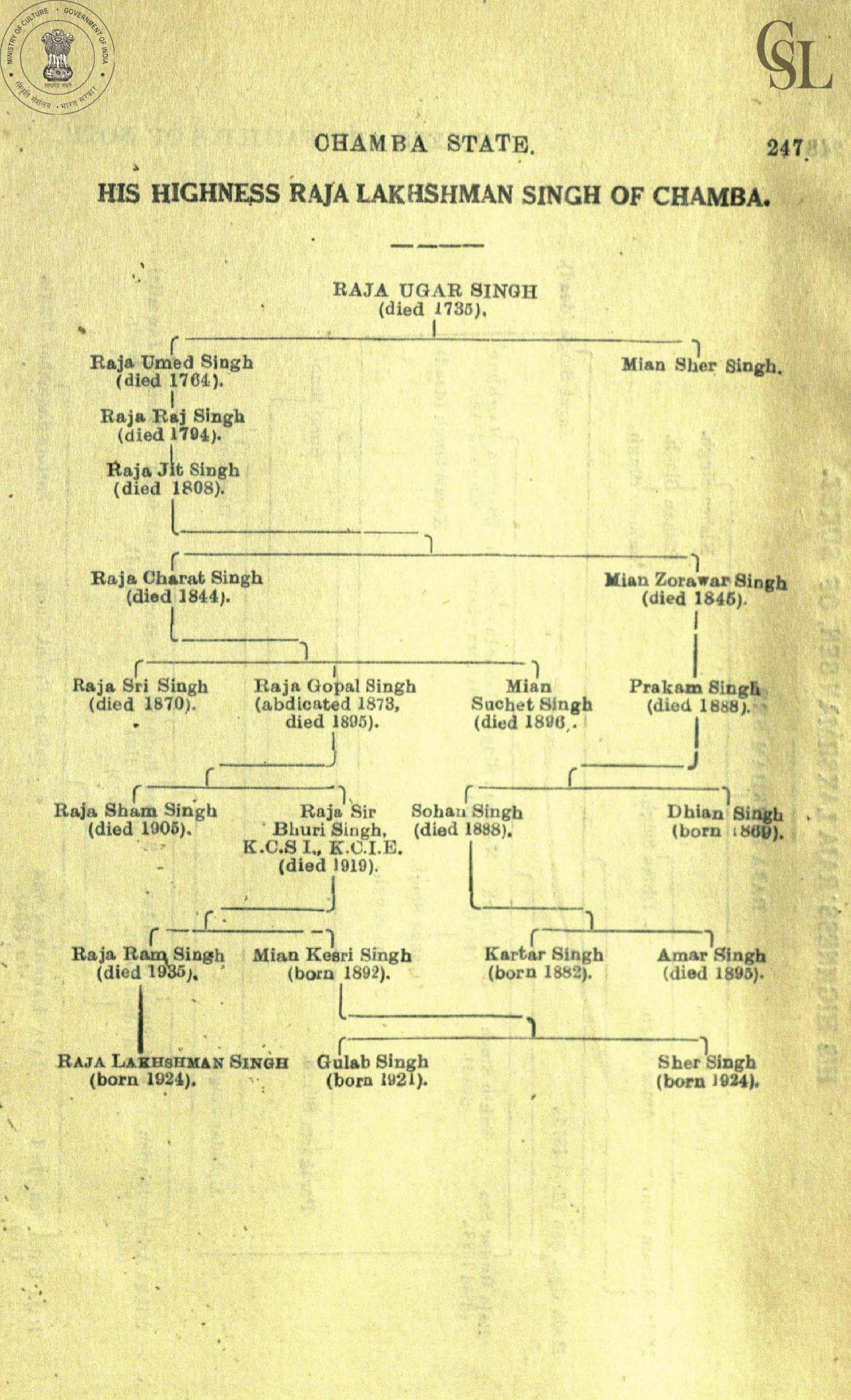
Genealogical pedigree (family-tree) of the ruling family of Chamba State, Punjab, revised pedigree-table (1940)

The rule of male primogeniture is followed, with some issueless rulers adopting male members of collateral branches of the ruling dynasty to ensure dynastic continuity. The following are the known rulers of Chamba in Himachal Pradesh:

Rajas of Chamba State
Ruler (lifespan)	Portrait	Timeline or reign
Raja Maru		~550 AD
Raja Jaistambh		After Maru’s death
Raja Jalstambh		?
Raja Mahstambh		?
Raja Aditya Varman		?
Raja Bala Varman		c. 640
Raja Divakara Varman		c. 660
Raja Meru Varman		c. 680
Raja Mandar Varman		?
Raja Kantar Varman		?
Raja Pragalbh Varman		?
Raja Ajia Varman		c. 760
Raja Suvarn Varman		c. 780
Raja Lakshmi Varman		c. 800
Raja Mushan Varman		c. 820
Raja Hans Varman		?
Raja Sar Varman		?
Raja Sen Varman		?
Raja Sajjan Varman		?
Raja Mrtyunjaya Varman		?
Raja Sahila Varman		c. 920
Raja Yugakar Varman		c. 940
Raja Vidagdha Varman		c. 960
Raja Dodaka Varman		c. 980
Raja Vichitra Varman		After Dodaka Verman
Raja Dhariya Varman		After Vichitra Verman
Raja Salavahana Varman		c. 1040
Raja Soma Varman		c. 1060
Raja Asata Varman		c. 1080 – 1105
Raja Jasata Varman		1105–1118
Raja Dhala Varman		1118–1120
Raja Udayan Varman		1120–1122
Raja Ajita Varman		?
Raja Daityari Varman		?
Raja Prithvi Varman		?
Raja Lalita Varman		1143–1175
Raja Vijaya Varman		1175 – c. 1190s
Raja ? Varman		?
Raja Sara Varman		?
Raja Kirti Varman		?
Raja Ajita Varman		?
Raja Madana Varman		?
Raja Narakanajar Varman		?
Raja Asha Varman		?
Raja Jimut Varman		?
Raja Vairasi Varman (c. 1310 – 1370)		1330–1370
Raja Manikya Varman (d. 1397)		1370–1397
Raja Bhot Varman (d. 1442)		1397–1442
Raja Sangram Varman (d. 1475)		1442–1475
Raja Anand Varman (d. 1512)		1475–1512
Raja Ganesa Varman (d. 1559)		1512–1559
Raja Pratap Singh Varman (d. 1586)		1559–1586
Raja Vir Vahnu Varman (d. 1589)		1586–1589
Raja Balbhadra Varman (d. 1641)		1589–1613
Raja Janardan Singh		1613–1623
Raja Balbhadra Varman (d. 1641)		1623–1641
Raja Prithvi Raj Singh (b. 1623)		1641–1664
Raja Chattar Singh (d. 1690)		1664–1690
Raja Udai Singh (c. 1678 – 1720)		1690–1720
Raja Ugar Singh		1720–1735
Raja Dalel Singh		1735–1748
Raja Umed Singh (1709–1764)		1748–1764
Raja Raj Singh (1755–1794)		1764–1794
Raja Jit Singh (1775–1808)		1794–1808
Raja Charat Singh (1802–1844)		1808–1844
Raja Shri Singh (1839 – 27 November 1870)		1844–1870
Raja Gopal Singh (1840 – 1895)		1870–1873
Raja Shyam Singh (8 July 1866 – 10 June 1905)		1873–1904
Raja Buri Singh (18 December 1869 – 18 September 1919)		1904–1919
Raja Ram Singh (16 April 1880 – 7 December 1935)		1919–1935
Raja Lakshman Singh (9 December 1924 – 20 May 1971)		1935–1971
Titular heads
Raja Lakshman Singh (9 December 1924 – 20 May 1971)		1935–1971
Raja Prem Singh (b. 12 April 1948)		1971–present

== Titles ==
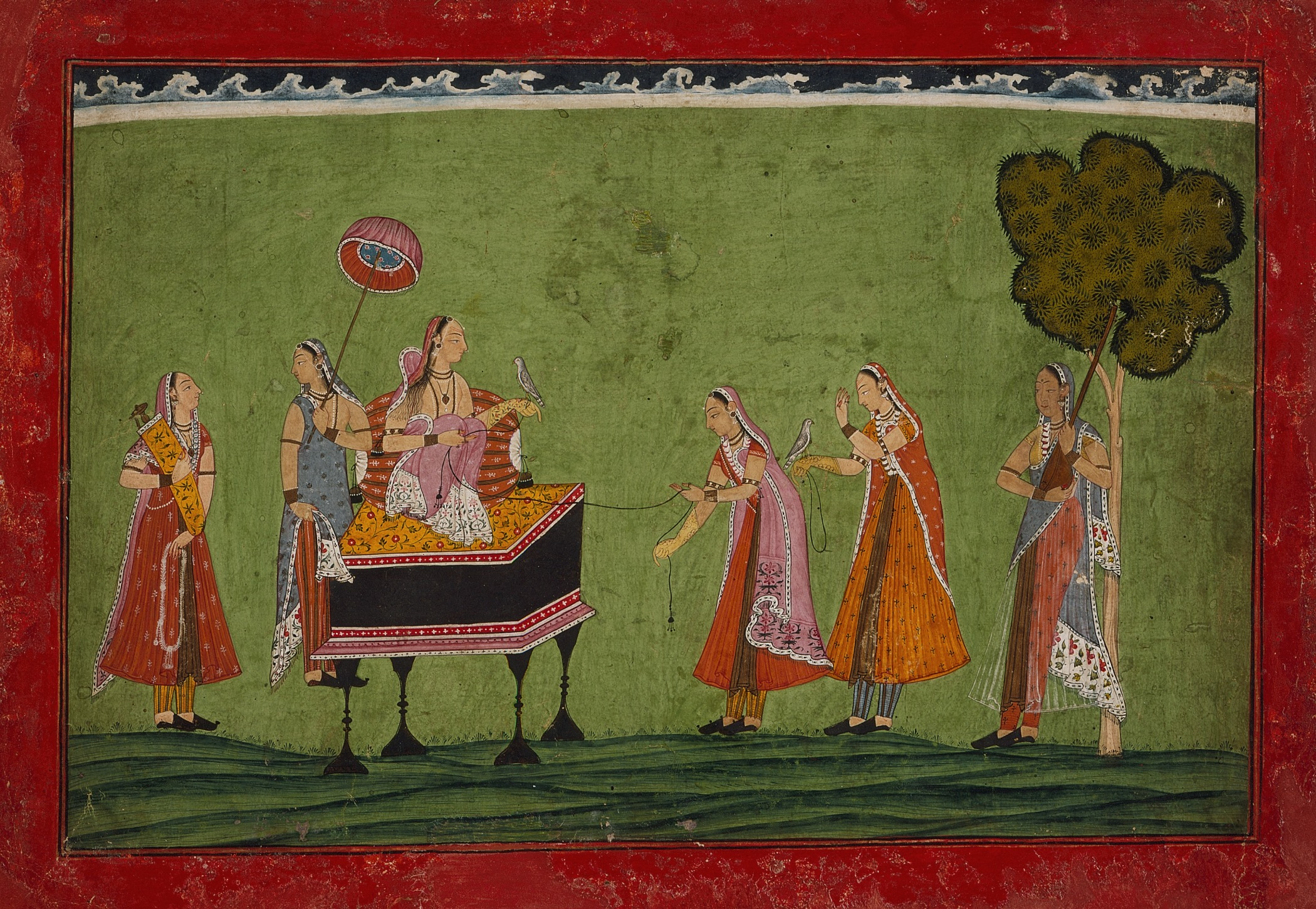
Painting of an early 18th century Chamba princess

Amongst the early rulers, the first ruler to append the Varman suffix to his name was Aditya Varman. Varman was used as a suffix until the mid-16th century, where after it was replaced by Singh. The rulers took on the raja title while their consort is a rani. Heir apparents are known as a tikka with their consort known as a tikka-rani. Younger sons of the raja and their descendants are given the mian title. Daughters of the raja are known as rajkumari.

== Artwork ==
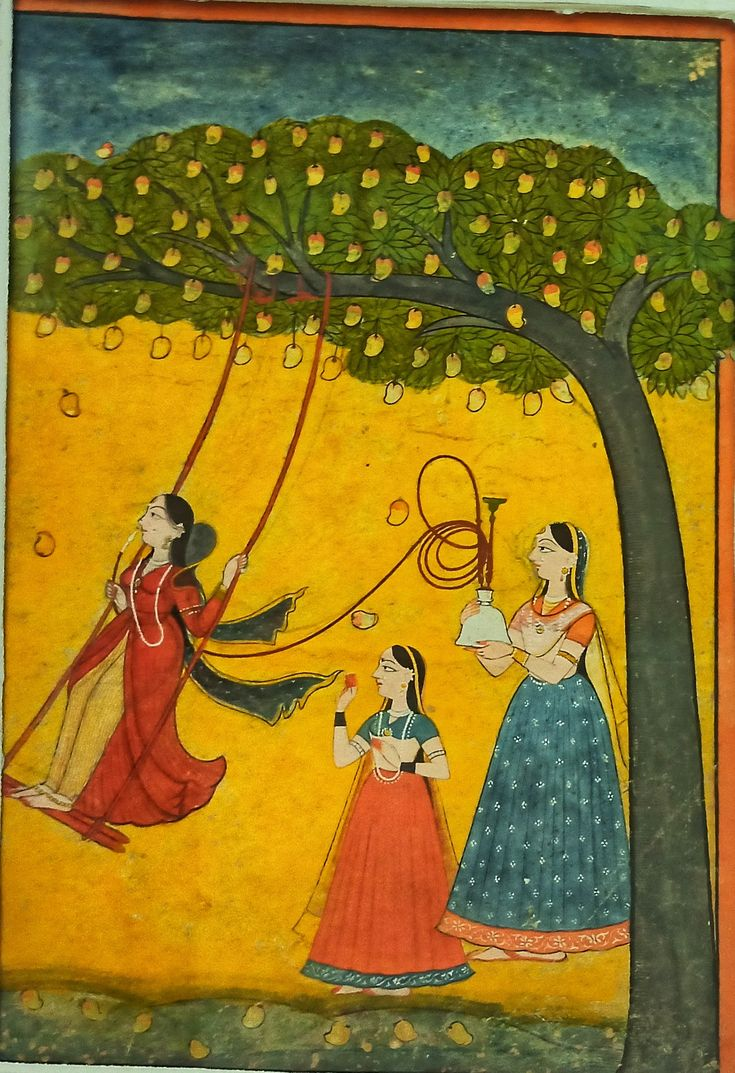
Lady on a Swing, circa 1740 CE, Chamba Kalam of Pahari School of Art, Bhuri Singh Museum, Chamba, Himachal Pradesh

The rulers of Chamba State patronized artists of the Pahari painting style.

== Demographics ==
Religious groups in Chamba State (British Punjab province era)
Religious group	1901		1911		1921		1931		1941	
Religious group	Pop.	%	Pop.	%	Pop.	%	Pop.	%	Pop.	%
Hinduism (Note: 1931-1941: Including Ad-Dharmis)	119,327	93.35%	126,269	92.93%	130,489	91.98%	135,254	92.09%	155,910	92.3%
Islam	8,332	6.52%	8,750	6.44%	10,529	7.42%	10,839	7.38%	12,318	7.29%
Sikhism	80	0.06%	141	0.1%	242	0.17%	112	0.08%	107	0.06%
Christianity	70	0.05%	81	0.06%	63	0.04%	94	0.06%	190	0.11%
Buddhism	22	0.02%	627	0.46%	541	0.38%	568	0.39%	383	0.23%
Jainism	3	0%	5	0%	3	0%	3	0%	0	0%
Zoroastrianism	0	0%	0	0%	0	0%	0	0%	0	0%
Judaism	0	0%	0	0%	0	0%	0	0%	0	0%
Others	0	0%	0	0%	0	0%	0	0%	0	0%
Total population	127,834	100%	135,873	100%	141,867	100%	146,870	100%	168,908	100%
Note: British Punjab province era district borders are not an exact match in the present-day due to various bifurcations to district borders — which since created new districts — throughout the historic Punjab Province region during the post-independence era that have taken into account population increases.

== See also ==
- Political integration of India
- Pahari painting
- Chaurasi Temple Bharmour
