= Ichhi =

- Village
- Location in Himachal Pradesh, India Ichhi (India)
- Coordinates: 32.146061°N 76.278389°E
- Country: India
- State: Himachal Pradesh
- District: Kangra

Area
  - Total: 29.60 km^{2} (11.43 sq mi)
- Elevation: 1,457 m (4,780 ft)

Population (2015)
  - Total: 53,543
  - Density: 1,809/km^{2} (4,685/sq mi)

Language
  - Official: Hindi
- Time zone: UTC+5:30 (IST)
- PIN: 176 209
- Telephone code: +91-1892
- Vehicle registration: HP 40, HP 68, HP 01D, HP 02D
- Website: www.hpkangra.nic.in

Ichhi (also Ichhi Khas) is a village and a Village Panchayat in Kangra district in the Indian state of Himachal Pradesh. Ichhi village is 8 kilometres from Kangra.

Near to it 10 km Dharamshala has been selected as one of the hundred Indian cities to be developed as a smart city under PM Narendra Modi's flagship Smart Cities Mission.

== Description ==
Ichhi is a village in the reaches of the Kangra Valley and is surrounded by fields and trees. The suburbs include Jhikli Ichhi, Ansoli, Patola, Mastpur, Zamanabad Road ICHHI.

== Etymology ==
Ichhi (Devanagari: इच्छी; ITRANS: is a Hindi word (derived from Sanskrit)

In common Hindi usage, the word इगेतेश्वर refers to god Shiv.

== Ichhi History ==
=== Before the Raj ===
Until the British Raj, Dharamshala and its surrounding area was ruled by the Katoch Dynasty of Kangra, a royal family that ruled the region for two millennia. The royal family still keeps a residence in Dharamsala, known as 'Clouds End Villa'. Under the British Raj, the regions were part of undivided province of Punjab, and was ruled by the governors of Punjab from Lahore. The Katoch dynasty, although highly regarded culturally, had been reduced to status of jargidars (of Kangra-Lambagraon) under the Treaty of Jawalamukhi, signed in 1810 between Sansar Chand Katoch and Maharaja Ranjit Singh of Sikh Empire. The indigenous people of the Dharamshala area (and the surrounding region) are the Gaddis, a predominantly Hindu group who traditionally lived a nomadic or semi-nomadic transhumant lifestyle. Due to the lack of permanent settlements in the area, some Gaddis lost their seasonal pastures and farmland when the British and the Gurkhas arrived to settle.

=== Settlement ===
"Ichhi village lies on a spur of the Dhaola Dhār, 6 miles north-east of Kāngra, in the midst of wild and picturesque scenery.

"Before the earthquake of 1905, it was very well populated.

In 1905, the Kangra valley suffered a major earthquake. On 4 April of that year, the earth shook, demolishing much neighbouring city of Kangra, Himachal Pradesh . Altogether, the 1905 Kangra earthquake killed 20,000 people. "1,625 persons perished at Dharamsāla alone."

== Geography ==
Ichhi Village is located in the Kangra Valley, in the shadow of the Dhauladhar mountains.

The main crops grown in the valleys below are rice, wheat and vegetables.

== Major suburbs ==
- Ichhi Khas
- Ichhi Upparli

== Connections ==
Dharamshala town is reached by Dharamshala Gaggal Airport codes|DHM|VIGG, about 12 km to the town's south and about 10 km north of Kangra, Himachal Pradesh town. To reach Dharamshala by train, one has to reach Kangra, Himachal Pradesh town by Kangra Valley Railway line from Pathankot 94 km away and then take a bus or a taxi.

Pathankot is a broad gauge railway head. There is another railway line from Pathankot to Jogindernagar, a part of the Mandi District of Himachal Pradesh, which is a narrow-gauge line. The nearest station to Dharamshala on this line is Chamunda Marg, half an hour away, where a Shakta pitha is; the town is well connected by road to other parts of the country.

Buses of all classes (deluxe, air-conditioned, and regular) ply daily between Dharamshala and major cities such as Chandigarh, Delhi, and Shimla. Several buses each night connect McLeodGanj with Majnu Ka Tila, the Tibetan settlement in Delhi.

== Climate ==
Climate data for Dharamsala
| Month | Jan | Feb | Mar | Apr | May | Jun | Jul | Aug | Sep | Oct | Nov | Dec | Year |
|---|---|---|---|---|---|---|---|---|---|---|---|---|---|
| Record high °C (°F) | 24.7 (76.5) | 28.0 (82.4) | 31.6 (88.9) | 35.6 (96.1) | 38.6 (101.5) | 38.6 (101.5) | 42.7 (108.9) | 37.8 (100.0) | 34.8 (94.6) | 34.6 (94.3) | 26.6 (79.9) | 27.2 (81.0) | 42.7 (108.9) |
| Mean daily maximum °C (°F) | 14.5 (58.1) | 16.6 (61.9) | 21.1 (70.0) | 26.2 (79.2) | 30.5 (86.9) | 31.4 (88.5) | 27.2 (81.0) | 26.3 (79.3) | 26.3 (79.3) | 24.8 (76.6) | 20.7 (69.3) | 16.7 (62.1) | 23.5 (74.3) |
| Mean daily minimum °C (°F) | 5.9 (42.6) | 7.7 (45.9) | 11.8 (53.2) | 16.3 (61.3) | 20.1 (68.2) | 21.8 (71.2) | 20.7 (69.3) | 20.2 (68.4) | 18.7 (65.7) | 15.3 (59.5) | 10.7 (51.3) | 7.4 (45.3) | 14.7 (58.5) |
| Record low °C (°F) | −1.9 (28.6) | −1.6 (29.1) | 2.4 (36.3) | 7.3 (45.1) | 8.8 (47.8) | 12.8 (55.0) | 15.1 (59.2) | 14.1 (57.4) | 11.2 (52.2) | 8.0 (46.4) | 4.8 (40.6) | −1.0 (30.2) | −1.9 (28.6) |
| Average precipitation mm (inches) | 114.5 (4.51) | 100.7 (3.96) | 98.8 (3.89) | 48.6 (1.91) | 59.1 (2.33) | 202.7 (7.98) | 959.7 (37.78) | 909.2 (35.80) | 404.8 (15.94) | 66.3 (2.61) | 16.7 (0.66) | 54.0 (2.13) | 3,054.4 (120.25) |
| Average rainy days | 6.1 | 5.4 | 5.8 | 4.0 | 4.6 | 9.3 | 22.0 | 22.2 | 12.8 | 3.1 | 1.2 | 2.9 | 99.4 |
Source: India Meteorological Department (record high and low up to 2010)
