= Nurpur kingdom =

Nurpur kingdom from Himachal Pradesh

Coordinates: 32.3°N 75.9°E

Mau-Paithan-Nurpur kingdom
- 1064–1947
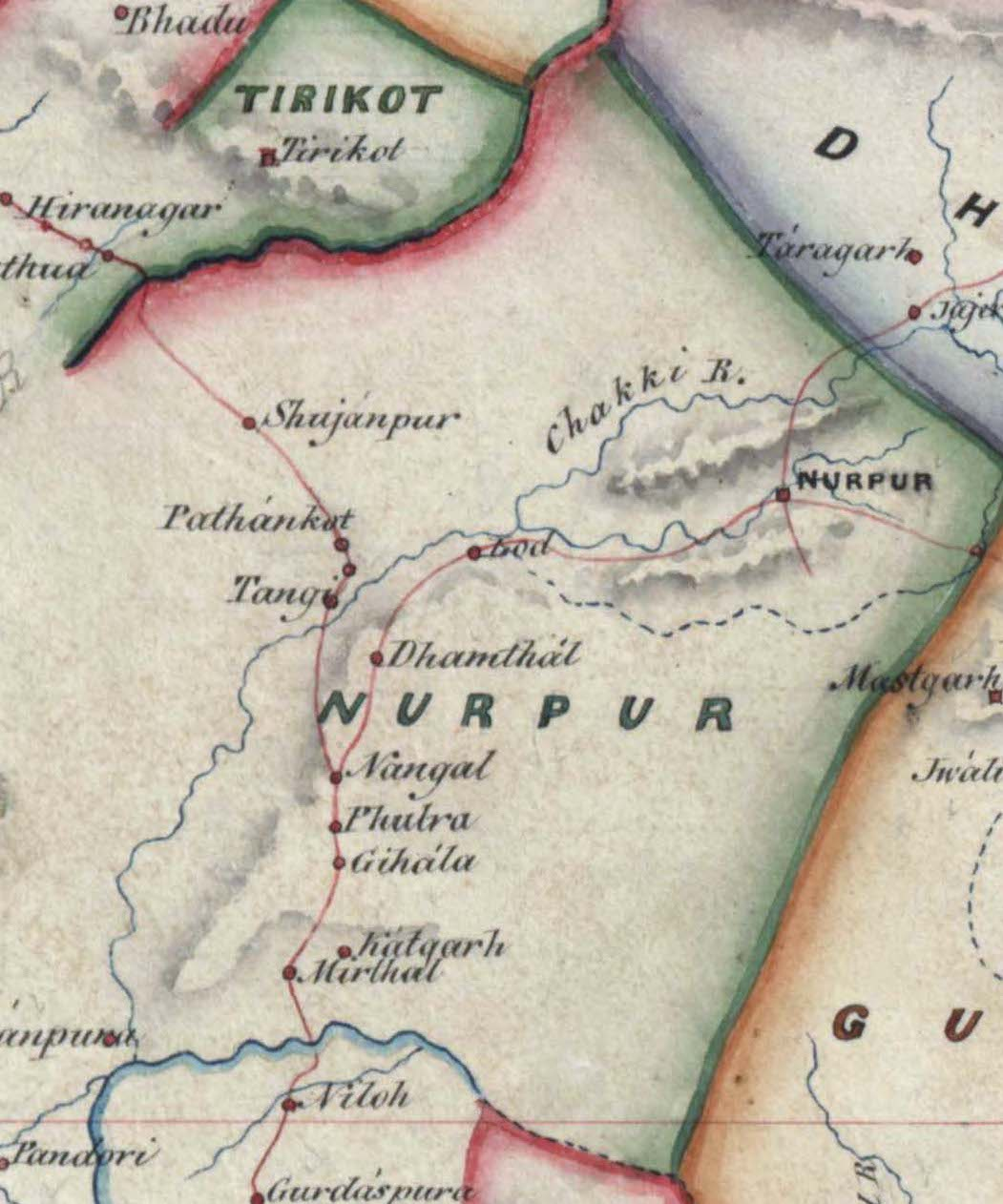
- Detail of the territory of Nurpur from a map of the various Hill States of the Punjab Hills region, copied in 1852. Parts of its borders has not been fully demarcated on the map.
- Capital: Pathankot (1064s–1580); Shahpurkandi (1650s–1781); Nurpur (1580s–1815)
- Common languages: Takri script Dogri; Kangri; Chambeali; Bhateali
- Religion: Hinduism
- Government: Hereditary monarchy
- Raja
  - 1064–1098: Raja Jhetpal (first)
  - 1898-1952: Raja Gagan Singh (last)
- History
  - Established: 1064
  - Disestablished: 1947

Area
  - Total: 180 km^{2} (69 sq mi)
Preceded by	Succeeded by
Ghaznavid Empire; Trigarta Kingdom	Sikh Empire

Nurpur kingdom in the Himalayan foothills of India was founded in 1064 A.D at north-eastern Bari Doab between the Ravi and the Beas rivers at the fusion of Kangra, Duggar, Majha, Dharab and Chamba areas which ended in 1815. The remnants of Nurpur kingdom exist as ruined forts, restored temples, water bodies, and canals in Nurpur tehsil, Fatehpur tehsil, Pathankot, Dhar Kalan tehsil, Jawali tehsil, Indora tehsil, Bhattiyat tehsil, and Sihunta tehsil.

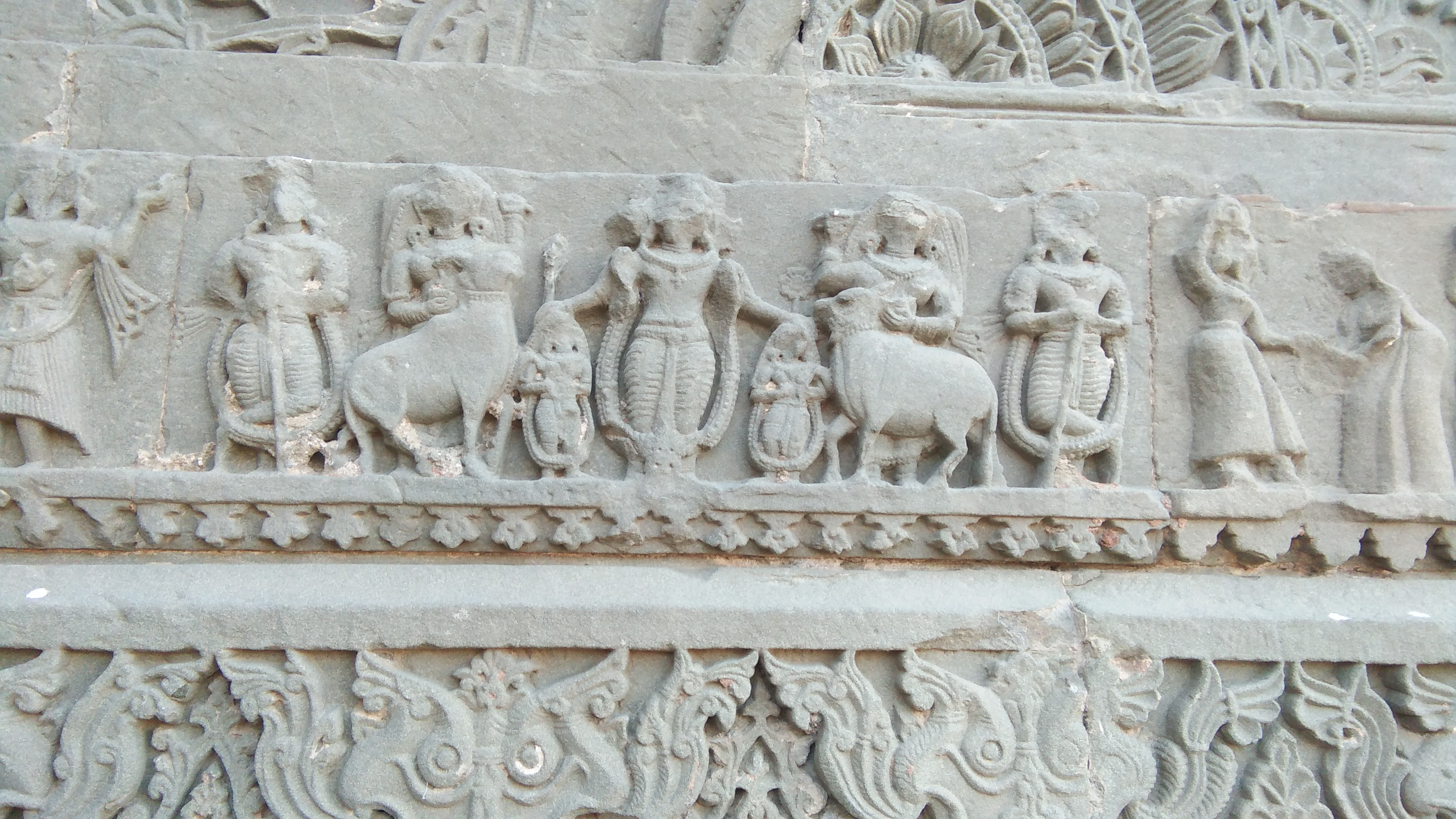
Relief work dedicated to Krishan Leela on foundation of ruined temple in Nurpur Fort

== History ==
The Nurpur kingdom, originally known as Dhameri (धमेरी/دھمیری/ਧਮੇਰੀ), was founded towards the middle of the 11th century by Tomaras of Delhi. Jhetpal the founder of Nurpur Kingdom in 1064 A.D was the younger brother of Anangpal II of Tomara dynasty from the family of King Arjuna of Mahabharata fame, 2250 years before him. King Vikramaditya who began the Vikrama Samvat era in 57 BCE after defeating the Shakas belonged to the same lineage. The principal era to which the luni-solar system is exclusively adapted is that of Vikramaditya, called Samvat. The prince for whom it was named was of the Tuár dynasty and is supposed to have reigned at Ujjain (Ujjáyini).

Tomar Raja Mahipal a k.a Kunwar Pāla (1021-1051) of Delhi in 1043 defeated Mahmud of Ghazni's grandson Mawdud of Ghazni and liberated the Nagarkot fort. Mahmud of Ghazni's fifth son Abd al-Rashid (1049-1052) appointed Hastagin Hajib as the governor of Punjab and recaptured liberated Nagarkot fort in 1052 after the death of Raja Mahipal. Late Raja Mahipal's brother Jhetpal Tomar led an expeditionary force to protect Trigarta king Jagdish Chand of Katoch dynasty and successfully recaptured the Kangra fort in 1060 AD. In retaliation, Ibrahim of Ghazna (1059-1099) sent his son, Mahmud, with an army of ghazis consisting of 40,000 cavalry to raid Doab of Punjab region, between 1063 and 1070. Due to these constant attacks Trigarta Kingdom shifted its capital from Doab Jalandhar to Kangra Fort in 1070 A.D. and to double secure Kangra Fort Jhetpal Tomar overpowered the garrison of Ghaznavid Kiladar Kuzbak Khan stationed at Paithan Fort, Pathankot which was the gateway to Kangra Valley between River Ravi and River Beas from the plains of Badi doab. Raja Jhetpal, after the death of Ibrahim of Ghazna in 1099 permanently stationed his garrison at Pathankot and the territorial surname Pathania became surname of clan.

Nurpur reached its peak between 1580 and 1613 during the reign of Raja Basu Dev who built an impressive fort that can still be seen today but his son Suraj Mal of Nurpur was driven away by Mughals in 1618.

In 1620 the change of name from Dhameri to Nurpur was done by Raja Jagat Singh to honour Mughal emperor and empress as 'Nur' was a common prefix to their names Nur-ud-din Muhammad Jahangir and Nur Jahan. Nurpur kingdom paid taxes after it came under Mughals. It rebelled when taxes were raised to 66% and the settlement took place after the War of Taragarh 1640–1642.

Till 1739 kingdom remained a feudatory state of Mughal Empire and became independent during Campaigns of Nader Shah. During Indian campaign of Ahmad Shah Durrani from (1747-1767) Raja Fateh Singh survived the invader but Raja Prithvi Singh (1770-1805) expelled Muslim branch of Pathania (1650-1781) based at Shahpurkandi Fort near Shahpurkandi dam project colony, they migrated to Pakistan in 1947. Also, Prithvi Singh forced his brother Inder Singh (Rey branch) whom he considered as claimant of Nurpur kingdom to take exile in 1779 at Mahal Moriyan Fort Kangra State (presently at Mehal Khas, Bhoranj, Hamirpur), they later migrated to Rey in 1823 after the death of Sansar Chand, Sikh Empire appointed Inder Singh's son Ishri Singh as courtier in the Lahore durbar and awarded Rey jagir. Ishri Singh was also brother-in-law of Dhian Singh, the longest reigning prime minister of Sikh Empire from 1818-1843.

Raja Bhir Singh had to face threats from all sides bordering Sikhs, Gorkhas, Katoch and British. Ultimately after just 10 years of his reign Ranjit Singh the final winner of the contest annexed Nurpur kingdom in 1815. Raja Bhir Singh retook the Nurpur in 1846 but died fighting at the gates of Nurpur Fort.

His struggle was continued by his son Raja Jaswant Singh Pathania and his uncle's son Ram Singh Pathania, who resorted to guerilla warfare but was captured by deceit from Lakhanpur, Jammu Fort by Jammu and Kashmir (princely state) which was under British control. The state was annexed by the British East India Company in 1849 and the last ruling monarch of Nurpur, was given Rs 5000/- financially compensated by the British for the loss of his state.

== See also ==
- Tomaras of Delhi
- Tomaras of Gwalior
- Tomaras of Beja
- Kangra painting
