= Siege of Kangra =

Sikh military operation in the Hills

- Part of Mughal-Sikh Wars
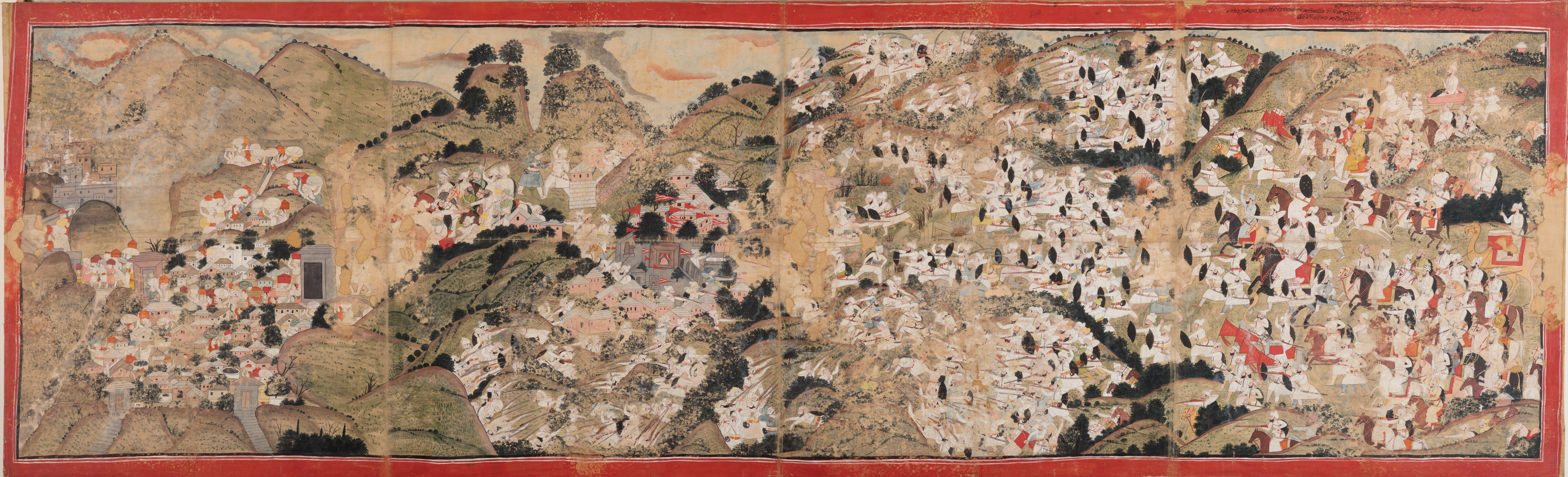
- Raja Sansar Chand attacking Kangra Fort, c. 1782
Date	1782–1783
Location	Kangra fort
Result	Kanhaiya victory
Territorial changes	Kanhaiya occupation of the Kangra fort; Gurbakhsh Singh establishes authority over the Kangra hills up to Palampur.; Jasrota, Basohli, and Jammu come under Kanhaiya supremacy

Belligerents
Katoch Rajputs; Kanhaiya Misl; Singh Krora Misl	Mughal Empire

Commanders and leaders
Sansar Chand; Gurbaksh Singh Kanhaiya; Baghel Singh	Nawab Saif Ali Khan; Jiwan Khan

The siege of Kangra began in 1782, when Raja Sansar Chand Katoch attempted to recover his ancestral seat the Kangra Fort from the Mughal governor, Saif Ali Khan. Jai Singh Kanhaiya, supported the former along with his Generals, Gurbaksh Singh Kanhaiya and Baghel Singh. On death of Saif Ali khan his son Jiwan Khan succeeded as commander. Gurbakhsh Singh was able to secure the fort for the Kanhaiya Misl through negotiation, thereby sidelining Sansar Chand and strengthening Sikh power in the Kangra hills.

== Background ==
The Afghan rule in the region between the Chenab and the Sutlej Rivers came to an end by 1769, paving the way for the establishment of Sikh political power in the plains of Punjab. Once they consolidated themselves in the plains, the Sikhs began to turn towards the adjoining hill areas. The relatively prosperous condition of the petty hill rajas attracted Sikh interest, as these rulers lacked the means to mount a significant resistance.

When the Hill rajas could no longer resist the Sikh onslaught, they sought refuge in surrender. Many more acknowledged the Sikh overlordship after Ghamand Chand, who was among the first to do so. In return for security from future invasions, these monarchs agreed to pay an annual tribute. Unless the hill rajas sought Sikh involvement to settle their internal conflicts, this system usually guaranteed that they would remain undisturbed. Jassa Singh Ramgarhia, a prominent Sikh commander who dominated the upper Bari and Jullundur Doabs next to the hill area, took control of the Kangra hills by 1770. By collecting an annual payment of two lakhs of rupees from the Kangra hill kingdoms, he established his suzerainty over them.

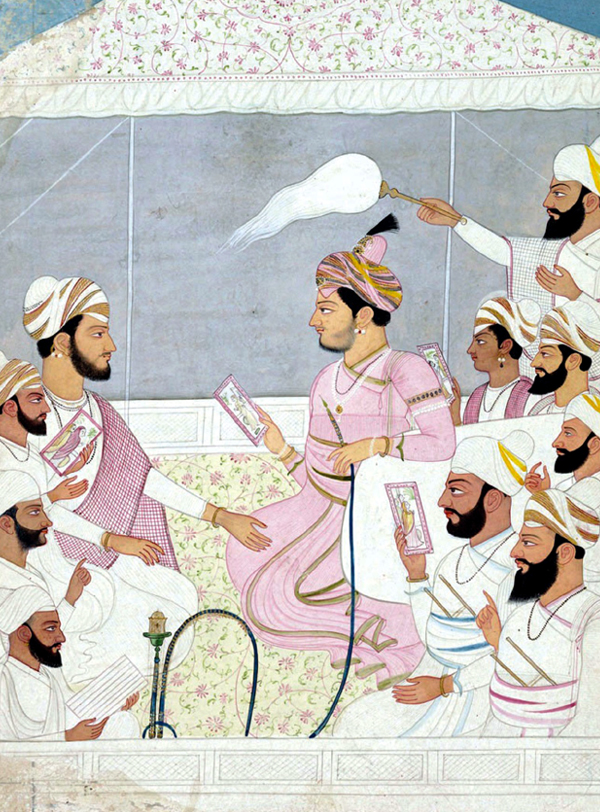
Sansar Chand of Kangra

However, Jassa Singh Ramgarhia's domination was brief. His opponent Jai Singh Kanhaiya defeated him in 1778 and went on to rule over the majority of the Kangra region. Sansar Chand rose to prominence in the area by 1776. Sansar Chand was an ambitious as ruler who aimed to retake Kangra's fort, which was his family's ancestral home and a historic stronghold.

On multiple occasions, Sansar Chand tried to take the Kangra fort, but Saif Ali Khan the Mughal faujdar of Kangra at that time frequently repulsed him. Sansar Chand was eager on accomplishing his goal and turned to Jai Singh Kanhaiya for help, promising to pay for the troops at a rate of Rs. 2,000 per day. After accepting the request, Jai Singh sent his son, Gurbakhsh Singh, and a large troop, which included Baghel Singh Karorasinghia. In 1782, the allied armies besieged the fort together.

== Siege ==
Saif Ali Khan was determined to defend the fort regardless of how severe the siege got. His health, however, declined, and he died in 1783. Following his death, plans were made to take his remains to be buried at the imambara outside the fort. At this time, Sansar Chand had secretly approached the Mughal gunners positioned inside the fort, offering them large sums of money in return for their assistance. But Gurbaksh Singh Kanhaiya secretly negotiated with Jiwan Khan, the new faujdar and son of the late Saif Ali Khan to surrender the fort for a bribe. Jiwan Khan made the decision to surrender the fort after seeing how fragile his position was.

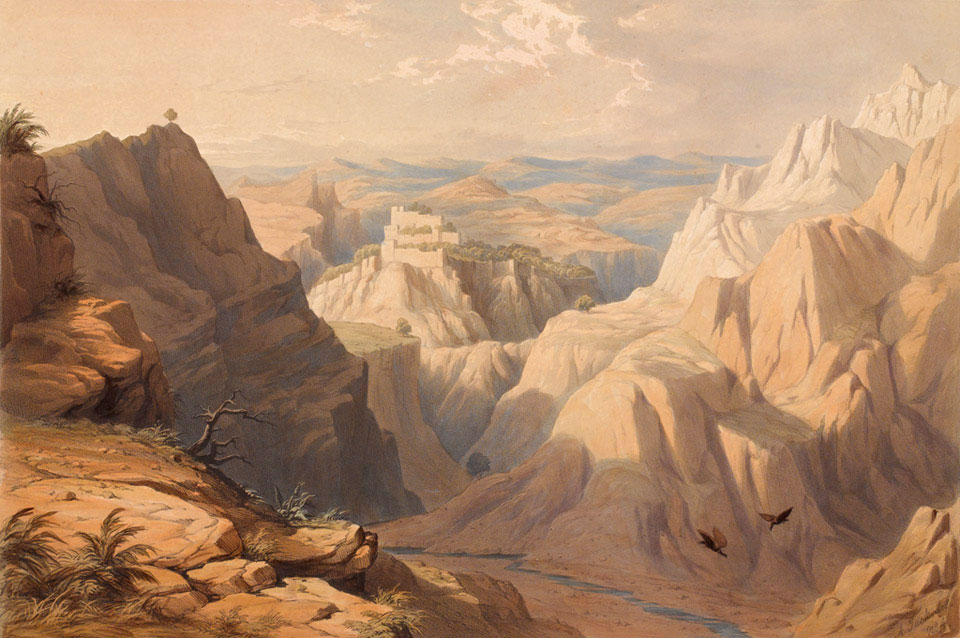
View of the mountains round Kot Kangra.

The gunners informed Sansar Chand's army to take advantage of the situation and attack the fort while the Nawab's men covertly transported Saif Ali Khan's body to the imambara. However, the Sikh army learned of this plot and were stationed close to the entrance to withstand any musket fire. The Sikhs moved quickly and were the first to enter the fort, with Jiwan Khan offering no opposition. As soon as possible, they locked the gates, barring Sansar Chand's army from entering, forcing Sansar Chand to retreat.

== Aftermath ==
After taking control of Kangra Fort, Jai Singh expanded his power in the Kangra area, gaining control over Jasrota, Basohli, and Jammu region. Among the Rajas and Thakurs of the surrounding states, he was the most important ruler due to his supremacy.

Jai Singh established his dominance over the surrounding regions by occupying Kangra Fort for over four years. But he had to give the fort to Sansar Chand in 1786 after the Battle of Achal. He gained plains lands that the Katoch chief had taken in exchange, establishing a strategic power shift in the area.
