= Nepal–Sikh war =

1809 conflict in South Asia

Nepal-Sikh war
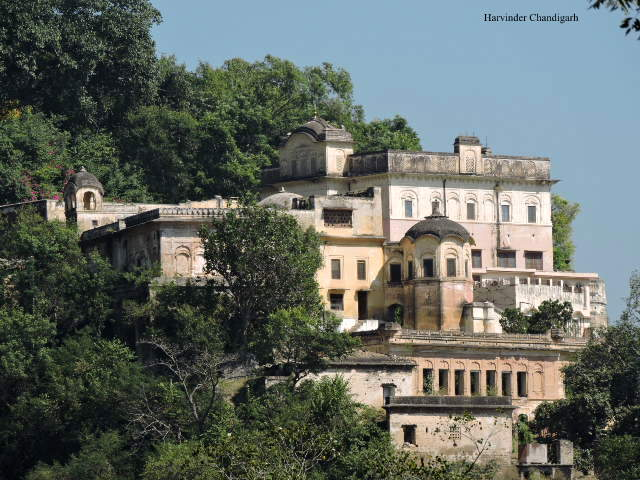
- Arki Fort in Himachal Pradesh, India
Date	March 1809 – August 1809
Location	Kangra Fort
Result	Sikh victory: Gurkhas retreat
Territorial changes	Kangra State annexed by the Sikh Empire

Belligerents
Sikh Empire; Kangra State; Bilaspur State; Supported by: Patiala State; Garhwal Kingdom	Kingdom of Nepal

Commanders and leaders
Ranjit Singh; Mokham Chand	Amar Singh Thapa

Strength
10,000	5,250

Casualties and losses
Unknown	Unknown

The Nepal–Sikh war was a small conflict in 1809 between the forces of the Kingdom of Nepal under Amar Singh Thapa and the Sikh Empire under Maharaja Ranjit Singh.

== Background ==
The confrontation between Nepal and the Sikhs had its genesis in the expansionist policy of the Nepalese mukhtiyar (head of government) Bhimsen Thapa. He endeavored to add Kumaon Kingdom, having been incorporated into Nepal in 1791, to its west as far as the river Sutlej. This expedition was entrusted to the Kaji Amar Singh Thapa, who was later reinforced by the Kaji Nain Singh Thapa. In 1807, Kangra Fort, on the west bank of the Sutlej, was put under siege. By early 1809, most of the land of Kangra jagir had been incorporated into Nepal, although the fort still held out. Raja Sansar Chand of Kangra took refuge among the Sikhs in the Punjab.

At first, the Sikh Maharaja Ranjit Singh was reluctant to assist the ruler of Kangra, but a Nepalese push towards the Kashmir Valley changed his mind. Kashmir was effectively an independent territory, riven by Afghan factions and coveted by both Sikhs and Gurkhas. The Sikh ruler dispatched a force which raised the siege of Kangra on 24 August 1809.

== War ==
The Maharaja recalled Diwan Mohkam Chand from the Kangra expedition in March 1809 and directed him to reach Phillaur. After the settlement of affairs with the British government, Maharaja Ranjit Singh again turned his attention towards Kangra. The Gurkha general Amar Singh Thapa had been at war for quite some time with Raja Sansar Chand in the Kangra valley and had besieged the fort of Kangra. Sansar Chand lost hope for life. Therefore, he sent his brother Fateh Singh to the Maharaja to seek help. The Maharaja demanded the possession of the fort of Kangra in return for help; to which Sansar Chand agreed. The Maharaja set-out with full preparations and reached Kangra accompanied his army by the end of May. All the feudal chiefs were present with their respective militias. The hill Chiefs who were well- acquainted with the routes of the hilly terrain were ordered to block all passages so as to stop all means of procurement of provisions and equipment for the Gorkha army.

Amar Singh Thapa sent a letter to Maharaja Ranjit Singh asking him to surrender and let them keep the fort from his forces and let the Gurkhas capture Kashmir. Ranjit Singh did not accept. The next morning supply routes of the Gurkha army had been closed by the Sikhs. They waited for ammunition and food of the Gurkhas to run out and after a few weeks the Gurkhas started eating their horses and camels, diseases like Cholera started rising and many died due to lack of medical supplies.

The Gurkhas in their mad frenzies of their 'last fight' before death madly ran into the muzzles of the Sikh forces, unplanned. After a month of starvation and bad conditions the Gurkhas made a charge onto the Ganesh Valley, Sikhs conquered the Kangra Fort and fired their superior artillery onto the Gurkhas. Their bow and arrows could not match to the Sikh cannons, after the gunpowder had finished 1,000 Sikh cavalrymen attacked the Gurkhas killing almost all of them.The remaining forces of Nain Singh Thapa arrived at Guler Fort. The violence ended after some time.

The Maharaja finding an opportune time to drive them out of Guler launched an attack and occupied their positions about a mile (1.06 km.) in front of the fort. A pitched battle ensued. The Gurkhas fought dauntlessly but they had to make a tactical retreat. Thereafter, they gave a pitched battle near the Sutlej where many Gurkhas died in the river, or drowned while holding off the attackers.

== Aftermath ==
Both sides suffered heavy losses. Kingdom of Nepal had to pause their westward expansion. Sutlej river became the border between Nepal and Sikh. Gurkhas had to withdraw from territories west of river Sutlej. Kingdom of Kangada was liberated. Sansar Chand had to ceded Kangra Fort to the Sikhs.
