= Jodhbir Chand =

Raja of Nadaun (1823 - 1873)

- Raja

Raja of Nadaun
- Predecessor: Position established
- Successor: Amar Chand
- Born: c. 1815
- Died: c. 1873
- Dynasty: Katoch
- Father: Sansar Chand
- Mother: Gulab Dassi

Sir Jodhbir Chand KCSI (1815 – 1873) was the Raja of Nadaun from 1823 until his death in 1873.

== Early life and background ==
He was born in 1815 to Sansar Chand and a concubine of his by the name of Gulab Dassi. He was a member of the Katoch dynasty. His ancestors had ruled the Kangra for centuries. He gave two of his sisters, Mehtab and Raj, in marriage to Ranjit Singh, the Maharaja of the Sikh Empire.

== Reign ==
Ranjit Singh conferred on him the title of Raja and a jagir of Nadaun that yielded an annual revenue of Rs. 100,000 in 1823. He initially acquired great influence at Lahore, being a personal favourite of Ranjit Singh. However, over the years, their friendship lessened. He was gradually stripped of the jagir lands until his income dropped to just Rs. 30,000. From 9 March 1846 onward—when Kangra was ceded to the East India Company by his brother-in-law, Ranjit Singh—he pledged loyalty to the Company. During the Katoch insurrection in Kangra (1848–49), he sided with the British. As a reward, the British confirmed his jagir upon the annexation of Kangra. During the Indian Rebellion of 1857, he once again supported them and sent his second son to fight on their side. His son was awarded the Order of Merit for his services.

== Death ==
He died in 1873 and was succeeded by Amar Chand as the Raja of Nadaun. Upon his death, the then Lieutenant Governor of Punjab, Robert Henry Davies, paid tribute to him in the following words:

... whose upright and honourable character had secured the respect and esteem of all , while he had discharged the duties of his position to the entire satisfaction of Government.

— Robert Henry Davies

== Honours ==
In 1868, he was made a Knight Commander of the Order of the Star of India and was granted a salute of seven guns.
