= Rajanaka Bhumi Chand =

Founder of the Trigarta Dynasty

Ranjanka (Great King) Bhumi Chand was the founder of the Trigarta Dynasty in Satyuga. He was the first great king of the Chandravanshi group (sub-group Katoch) of Kshatriyas Rajputs . He is mentioned in the Puran, the holy book of Hindus, as Brahmand Puran. According to this holy book, with the blessing of Goddess Parvati, he was born in the month of April or May, the date on which 'Chetermas ki Asthami' falls.

The Goddess Parvati created him to fight the Rakshasa (devils), which he did. The Goddess Parvati gave him the territory of Trigarta, the territory around the three rivers of Satluj, Beas, and Ravi. Rajanaka Bhumi Chand founded the Jwalaji Temple in Himachal Pradesh.

The Katoch clan was one of the 14 ruling clans of the Himachal Pradesh and Jammu regions in the medieval era. The Katoch dynasty was reputed to have ruled the town of Kangra and its vicinity since time immemorial. Katochs suffixed 'Chandra' to their names until the rise of the Sikh dynasty in Punjab after which some clan members started suffixing 'Singh' also. Until the reforms of the 1930s, the Katoch women were only married westward, generally to the Pathania and Jamwal/ Jamuwal men.

The branches of the Trigarta Raje Dynasty are:

- Katoch clan. Off shot of Trigart Raje Dynasty. First Came on the picture in Dwaper Yug
- Jaswal clan (Katoch) Started in Kalyug
- Guleria clan (Katoch) Started in Kaliyug
- Sibaia clan (Katoch) Started in Kaliyug
- Dadwal clan (Katoch) Started in Kaliyug
- Chib clan ( Katoch) Started in Kaliyug
