= Nadaun, Himachal Pradesh =

Nadaun नादौन
- Town
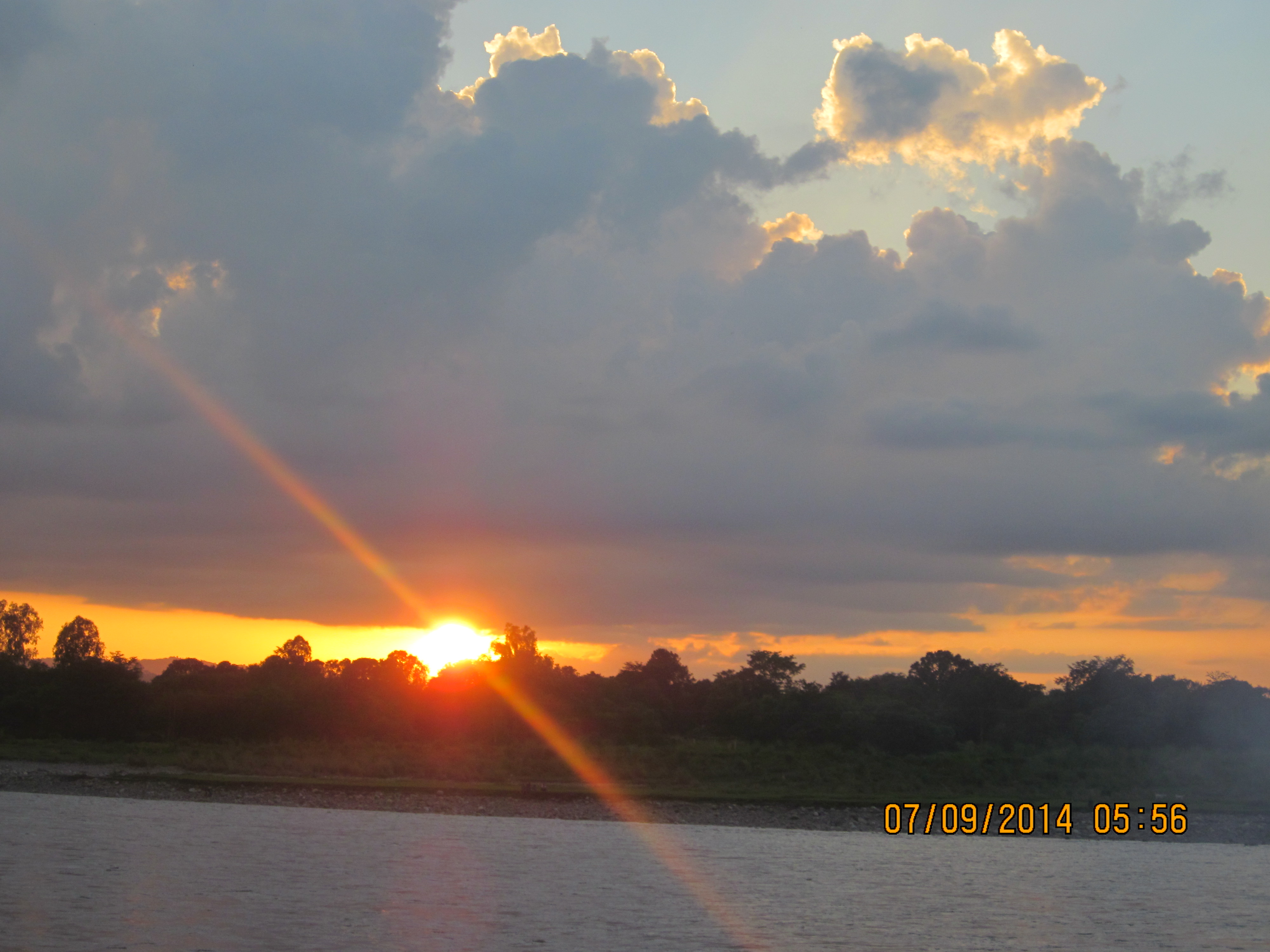
- View of sunset as Beas River flowing through Nadaun

- Location in Himachal Pradesh, India Nadaun (India)
- Coordinates: 31.78°N 76.35°E
- Country: India
- State: Himachal Pradesh
- District: Hamirpur
- Founded by: Raja Sansar Chand

Government
  - Type: Municipal Council
  - Body: Municipal Council Nadaun
  - Member Of Legislative Assembly (MLA): Sukhvinder Singh Sukhu, INC
  - Member of Parliament (MP): Anurag Thakur, BJP
  - Rank: 33
- Elevation: 508 m (1,667 ft)

Population (Approx by 2024)
  - Total: 7,700

Languages
  - Official: Hindi
  - Native: Kangri
- Time zone: UTC+5:30 (IST)
- PIN: 177033
- Vehicle registration: HP-55

Nadaun is a historical town and a Nagar Parishad in the Hamirpur district of Himachal Pradesh, India. Previously a part of the princely state of Kangra, it was granted as a jagir to Jodhbir Chand by Ranjit Singh. Nadaun is presently an independent small town located on NH 3 and NH 303 in the Sivalik range foothills. It is situated on the banks of the Beas.

Nadaun has boundaries with districts Kangra and Una.

Bulleh Shah mentions Nadaun as the City of Innocent. He is said to have written the famous saying, "Aaye Nadaun, Jaaye Kaun" (meaning "who comes to Nadaun would never want to go back"). In his famous poem Bulla Ki Janna Mein Kaun, he mentions Nadaun as "Na mein rehnda vich Nadaun".

== Geography ==
Nadaun is located at 31.78°N 76.35°E. It has an average elevation of 508 metres (1,666 feet). Beas flows through this small town. Nadaun lies midway between Jwalamukhi (12 km) and Hamirpur (28 km).

=== Climate ===
The climate of Nadaun is sub-tropical with monsoons in the months of July–August. The summers are between mid-May to mid-July. The temperature in summers rarely exceeds 40 degrees Celsius due to its proximity with the Himalayas and Beas river. The winters are cold but sub-zero temperatures are rare.

== Demographics ==
As of 2001 census, Nadaun had a population of 4405. Males constitute 51% of the population and females 49%. Nadaun has an average literacy rate of 89%, higher than the national average of 59.5%: male literacy is 83%, and female literacy is 78%. In Nadaun, 11% of the population is under 6 years of age.

== Area profile ==
As of 2011 India census,

- Number of Households - 990
- Average Household Size (per Household) - 5.0
- Population-Total - 4,440
- Population-Urban - 4,440
- Proportion of Urban Population (%) - 100
- Population-Rural - ××
- Sex Ratio - 959
- Population (0-6 Years) - 849
- Sex Ratio(0-6 Years) - 8.61%
- SC Population - 526
- Sex Ratio (SC) - 1008
- Proportion of SC (%) - 12.0
- ST Population - 0
- Sex Ratio (ST) - 0
- Proportion of ST (%) - 0
- Literates - 3,473
- Illiterates - 932
- Literacy Rate (%) - 89.0
- Literacy Rate (M):- 95.67%
- Literacy Rate (F)- 88.72%

=== Battle of Nadaun ===
Aurangzeb's expeditions in Deccan in the 1690s had put considerable strain on the Mughal exchequer. As a result, Aurangzeb issued orders to recover annual tributes from the rulers of Shivalik hills, who had been defaulting on the payment. Alif Khan was given the responsibility of recovering dues from Kangra and adjoining principalities.

The king of Kangra and a chieftain called Raja Dayal yielded to the demands of Alif Khan. However, king Bhim Chand of Kahlur (Bilaspur) refused to oblige and formed an alliance with other chieftains opposed to the Mughals. The 10th sikh guru Guru Gobind Singh decided to support Bhim Chand.

Alif Khan's army and his aides were defeated at a battle in Nadaun. The date of the battle is given variously by different authors, as 1687, 1689, 1690, 20 March 1691, and 4 April 1691.

After the battle ended, Guru Gobind Singh stayed in Nadaun for eight days, before returning to Anandpur. Later, Maharaja Ranjit Singh built a gurdwara on the spot where the Guru had pitched his tent. The Gurdwara was affiliated with Shiromani Gurdwara Prabandhak Committee in 1935.

== Economy ==
Nadaun is a wholesale market hub. The economy is based on agriculture, business, and government employment. The villages in Nadaun sub-division depend primarily on agriculture for their income such as dairy products and agricultural produce. In addition, there is a silk farm in Nadaun. Some people earn their livelihood by fishing from the Beas river.

Nadaun's business community is involved in small- to medium-sized businesses. These businesses take care of the day-to-day needs of not only Nadaun but also of nearby villages like Bela, Bharoli, Bharmoti, Chaukathi, Jalari, Bhumpal, Bhatta, Gagaal, and Sera. The main businesses in Nadaun are grocery stores (both retail and wholesale), furniture, goldsmiths, clothing, and construction materials. Some small-scale industries exist in Nadaun which produce the finished products in some of these areas.

== Transportation ==
There is no railway or airport connecting Nadaun to the rest of the country. The nearest railway station is Amb Andaura around 38 km (24 miles) from Nadaun. However, Nadaun is well connected by the road network, with a central position in terms of road connectivity. Two main roads diverge from Nadaun: one in the direction of the state capital Shimla via the National Highway NH88 and the other in the direction of the major nearby cities of Chandigarh and Hoshiarpur via National Highway 70.

Transportation within Nadaun and surrounding areas happens with the help of privately and government operated buses. Nadaun has a large bus station. Adjacent to it is a taxi stand where one can rent a taxi for short or long distances. For transportation of goods within the Nadaun town, one can take help from a coolie. Occasionally, people use boats to cross Beas River.

== Tourism ==
Nadaun is a popular destination among tourists.

Shri Gurudwara Sahib, Amtar-Nadaun Fort, Bil-kaleshwar Temple, and Peer-Sahib Grave are popular tourist attractions. Shri Gurudwara Sahib is located on the banks of Beas river; it is located where Guru Gobind Singh visited after the battle of Nadaun and is a major site for Sikh pilgrimage. The Amtar-Nadaun Fort served as the summer court of Maharaja Sansar Chand of Kangra. The Peer-Sahib Grave is located in Bharmoti village.

Winter and Summer are favourable times to visit Nadaun. Kangra-Gaggal airport is the nearest airport and the Jwalamukhi Road Railway Station is the nearest railhead.

== Education ==
Nadaun has been a center of education in Hamirpur district. Until the late 1980s, it was the only place in surrounding areas where one could receive high school education. GSSS Nadaun (Boys), Lala Lajpat Rai Samark, established in 1863, is the oldest educational institute. There is a Kendriya Vidyalaya primarily meant for employees of the central government of India and other government and private educational institutions. Nadaun, like many other parts of the country, has seen a progressive shift to English as a medium of education in most of the privately owned schools.

== Sports ==
Atal Bihari Vajpayee Stadium is the main cricket venue in the city which has played host to many matches for Himachal Pradesh cricket team.
