= Chabutra Khas =

Chabutra Chabutra
- Village
- Chabutra Khas
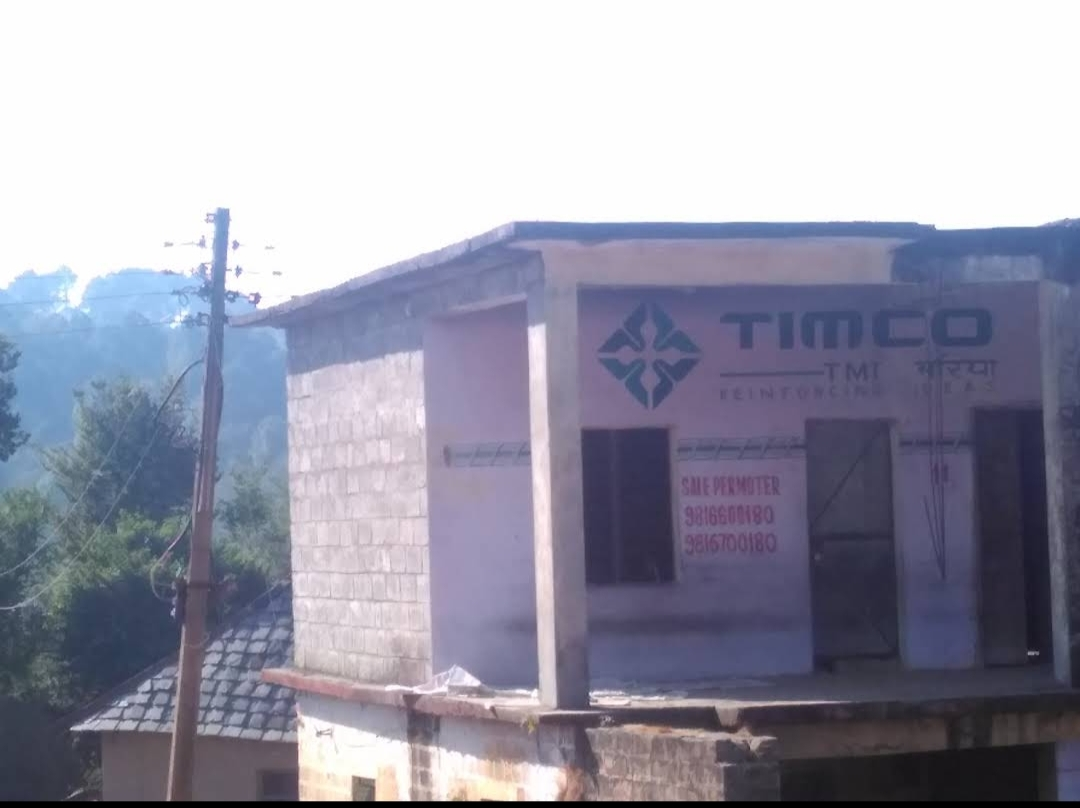

- Location in Himachal Pradesh Chabutra (Himachal Pradesh)
- Coordinates: 31°45′58″N 76°30′42″E
- Country: India
- State: Himachal Pradesh
- District: Hamirpur
- Founder: Sansar Chand

Government

Population (2011)
  - Total: 1,152

Languages
  - Official: Hindi
- Time zone: UTC+5:30 (IST)
- Postal code: 177007
- Vehicle registration: HP 67, HP 22, HP 84

Chabutra Khas better known as Chabutra is a village located in Tira Sujanpur tehsil of Hamirpur district, Himachal Pradesh, India. It is situated 12.4 km away from district headquarter and 11.6 km away from Tira Sujanpur In this Village there is a Electricity Department Sub division and Water Supply Department Sub Division. The village is located overlooking Beas River flowing below in the valley. The Postal Index Number of the village is 177007. Chabutra Khas population in 2011 is between 1,051 and 1,201 and total households residing are 237. The village has Secondary School called now called PM Shri Government Senior Secondary School, which was founded in 1943. and there has temple near which make the border between Tira Sujanpur and Hamirpur, Himachal Pradesh its name is "CHATURBHUJ TEMPLE " made by Sansar Chand king of kangra and also Tira Sujanpur and Raja Hamir Chand king of Hamirpur .
