= Suraj Mal of Nurpur =

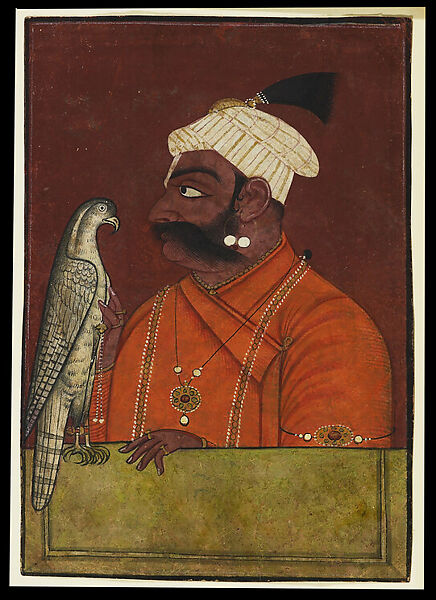
Raja Suraj Mal of Nurpur State holding a hawk, ca.1730–40

Suraj Mal (r. 1613–1618) was a Rajput ruler of Nurpur, Himachal Pradesh in India. During a campaign to Kangra Fort, he rebelled against the Mughals, then he went into exile and died at Chamba. His brother, Raja Jagat Singh, succeeded him as ruler of Nurpur.
