= Baba Baroh =

Coordinates: 31.997567°N 76.314179°E

Baba Baroh is a tehsil in Kangra district, India known for a temple dedicated to Radha Krishna and the Goddess Durga. This temple is famous for the huge amount of white marble used in its construction which is more than any temple in Himachal Pradesh. Baba Baroh is located 23 km from Kangra and 52 km away from Dharamshala. In this temple there is an idol of Goddess Durga which is made of metal. The main idols, Krishna and Radha are made of white marble. It was built by Mr.Bali Ram Sharma who was a devotee of lord Shiva. The temple also has a Sai Baba idol in the surrounding temple.
