= Raja Jagat Singh =

17th-century Indian monarch

- Portrait by Bichitr c.1619

King of Nurpur kingdom
- Reign: 1618 — January 1646
- Predecessor: Suraj Mal of Nurpur (1613-1618)
- Successor: Rajrup Singh Nurpur kingdom(1646-1700)
- Born: 1 January 1575; Nurpur, Nurpur kingdom, Mughal India (present-day Himachal Pradesh, India)
- Died: 1 January 1646 (aged 71); Chitral, Pakistan
- Issue: Rajrup Singh, Bhau Singh, Guleri Rani
- Father: Raja Vasudev
- Religion: Hinduism

Raja Jagat Singh, also known as Jagat Singh Pathania, was the Raja of Nurpur from 1618 to 1646. He also served in the Mughal Central Asia campaign. He is the first known Pahari ruler whose portrait exists.

== Folklore ==
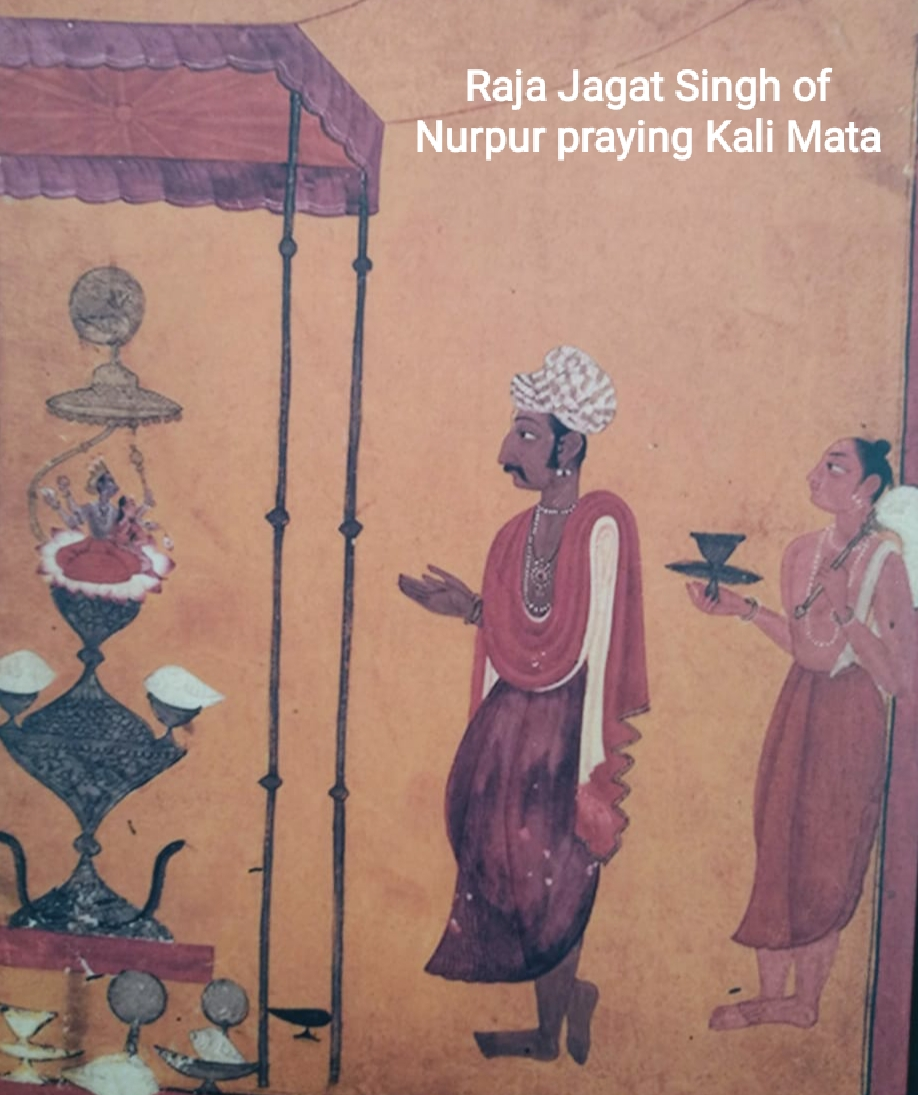
Raja Jagat Singh of Nurpur praying to Kali

A lack of rain for three years caused the Deccan famine of 1630–32. It affected the Gujarat, Malwa, and Deccan regions while the Mughals carried out a war campaign. While the entire province lay dead, Shah Jahan's war camp was “fair and spacious, plentifully stored with all provisions, being supplied with all things from all parts, far and near”. While people in the entire province were dying due to famine caused by his own army, Shah Jahan was collecting money to build the Taj Mahal, the construction of which began on 1632. Taxes in the Mughal Empire were among the highest in the world; according to the estimates of J.N.U scholar Shireen Moosvi, Mughals took 56.7% of total produce from peasants. Where the state's revenue needed to be used to quell the famine, Shah Jahan used it to build the Taj Mahal. According to contemporary sources like the letter written by a Dutch East India Company lawyer, the famine led to 7.4 million deaths.
