= Nurpur, Himachal Pradesh =

Nurpur
- Town
- Location in Kangra District, Himachal Pradesh, India Nurpur (India)
- Coordinates: 32.3°N 75.9°E
- Country: India
- State: Himachal Pradesh
- District: Kangra
- Elevation: 643 m (2,110 ft)

Population (2011)
  - Total: 9,807(17th)

Languages
  - Official: Hindi
  - Native: Kangri
- Time zone: UTC+5:30 (IST)
- Vehicle registration: HP-

Nurpur is a town and a municipal council in Kangra district in the Indian state of Himachal Pradesh. It was formerly part of the Nurpur State since the 11th century AD. It got its name from Nur Jahan, the wife of Mughal emperor Jahangir, when they visited Kangra (Nagarkot) after Jahangir's successful conquest of the Kangra Fort.

== Geography ==
Nurpur is located at 32.3°N 75.9°E. It has an average elevation of 643 metres (2109 feet).

== Demographics ==
As of 2001, according to the India census, Nurpur had a population of 9,045. Men constitute 52% of the population and women 48%. Nurpur has an average literacy rate of 78%, higher than the national average of 59.5%: male literacy is 81%, and female literacy is 75%. In Nurpur, 11% of the population is under 6 years of age. Majority of population is Hindu and Kangri language is spoken in Nurpur.

== Climate ==
Nurpur has a pleasant climate. The summer season is slightly higher than Himachal Pradesh's seasonal average, but the morning and evening daily weather is relatively cooler, thanks to a sustained, chilled breeze descending from the nearby snow-clad Dhauladhar mountains. During the monsoon season, there is a considerable amount of rainfall because Dharamsala, which receives second highest rainfall in India, is nearby. The winter season is very cold because of windchill from the aforementioned Dhauladhar. The temperature during the summertime rises up to 40 °C, but only for a few days at a time. Monsoons arrive by the end of June and remains until September. The presence of tourists peaks between October and November, largely because of the ideal weather.

== Access ==
Air: Nearest Airport is at Pathankot (Punjab) - 27 km away. Gaggal Airport, Dharamshala (DHM) (in Kangra, Himachal Pradesh) - 45 km away. Jammu (J&K) Airport- 129 km away; and Amritsar Airport (Punjab) -134 km away.

Rail: Nearest Railway Station (Narrow gauge - Kangra Valley Railway) is Nurpur-Road (Jassur, Himachal Pradesh) just 5 km away. Nearest Railhead is at [Pathankot and Pathankot Cantt.]- 24 km away, which is connected by train from all the major cities, going to Jammu/Katra.

Road: Nurpur is connected by road network from all sides and Pathankot/Kullu Manali highway passes through Nurpur. It is just 30 km from Pathankot, 88 km from Palampur and 61 km from Dharamsala
