= Guleria =

Rajput clan from North India

Guleria is a Rajput clan from Himachal Pradesh. The clan traces its history to early 15th century, when the Guler kingdom separated from the Kangra Kingdom.

== Etymology ==
The name Guleria is derived from Guler a historical town located in the Kangra region. The word Guleria literally means ' rajputs of guler and the rajputs belonging to Guler dynasty use surname as Guleria.

== History ==
The Guler clan came into existence in 1405 CE, when Raja Hari Chand of Kangra Kingdom was out on a hunt and fell into a well after separating from his hunting party. After a fruitless search and presuming the King was dead, the queens performed sati and Karam Chand, Raja's younger brother ascended the throne. Unbeknowest to them, Raja Hari Chand was still alive, and survived in the well for 22 days, before being rescued by a passing merchant. Upon hearing what had transpired at Kangra, and having already lost his family, Hari Chand decided not to attempt recovery of his kingdom. He then proceeded to select a spot where he built the town of Guler as the seat of his new kingdom..There was a King Raja Jaswant Singh Guleria of this Clan who was known for his bravery. He killed many Britishers during 1857 revolt. He was martyred with the bullet of police near Guler Railway station

== Offshoots ==
The Sibaia/Sephiya Clan Rajputs are off-shot of Guleria Clan Rajputs and they too have their own independent Siba State. Although Sibaias/Sephiya clan spread all over the world now yet its true that mostly they settled in and around Siba, Dada-Siba, Kangra and Hoshiarpur.

== Notable people ==
- Randeep Guleria, surgeon, Padma Shri awardee, Director AIIMS
- Jagdev Singh Guleria, former Dean of AIIMS, New Delhi, Padma Shri awardee
- Dolly Guleria, singer
- Arpit Guleria, cricketer, Himachal Pradesh, Services, Lucknow Super Giants
