= Sansar Chand =

Ruler of Kangra state (c. 1765 – 1824)

- Maharaja of Kangra
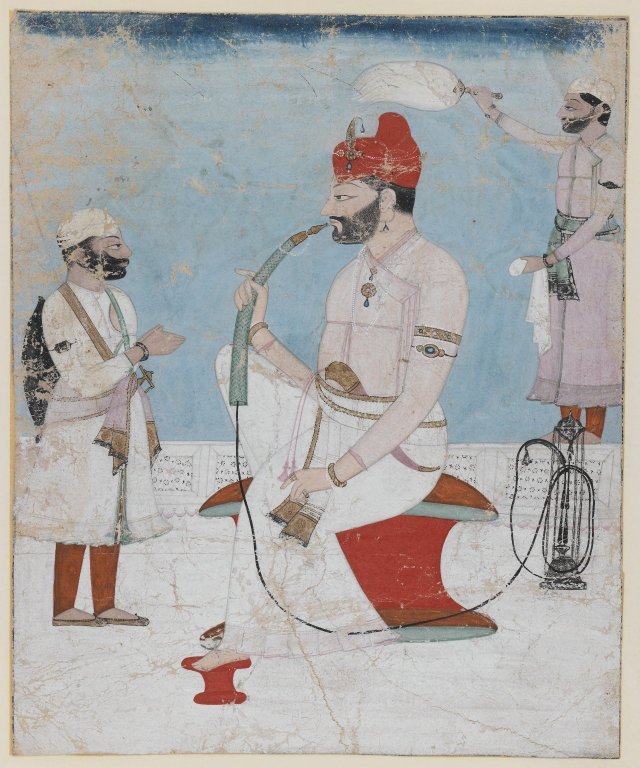

Maharaja of Kangra State
- Reign: 1758–1824
- Predecessor: Ghamand Chand
- Successor: Anirudh Chand
- Died: 1824; Nadaun, Himachal Pradesh
- Wife: Prasanna Devi
- Issue: Anirudh Chand; Jodhbir Chand; Rani Katochan; Raj Banso
- Dynasty: Katoch dynasty

Sansar Chand (c. 1765 – 1824) was a Rajput ruler of the Katoch dynasty of the erstwhile Kangra State in what is now the Indian state of Himachal Pradesh.

== Early life ==
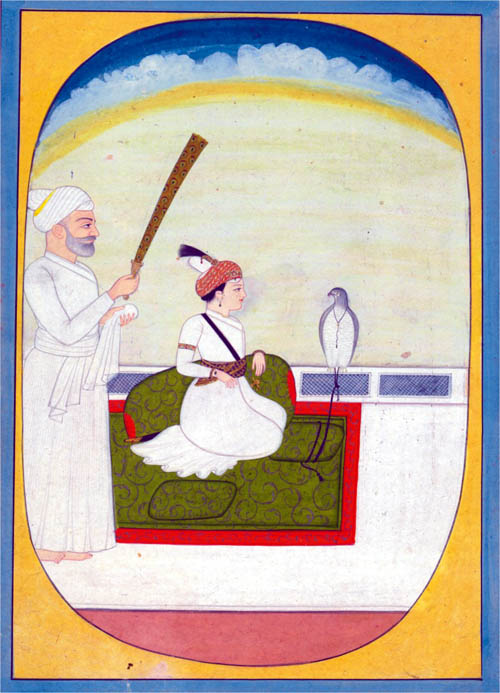
Miniature painting of Raja Sansar Chand of Kangra State as a young boy during his childhood

Sansar Chand was a scion of the Katoch dynasty, which ruled Kangra for centuries until they were ousted by the Mughals in the early 17th century. In 1758, Sansar Chand's grandfather, Ghamand Chand, was appointed governor of Jalandhar by Ahmed Shah Abdali. Sansar Chand rallied an army, ousted the Mughal governor of Kangra, Saifu Ali Khan Kaymkhani, and regained possession of his patrimony. Sansar Chand did a lot of work for the welfare of people mainly residing in nearby places apart from Kangra like Palampur, Hamirpur. He built many water distributaries. The water was used for farming and livestock.

== Military career ==
=== Conflict with other Hill States ===
In the historic Battle of Rehlu (1794), the Chamba chief, in collaboration with the Raja of Nurpur, confronted the formidable forces of Sansar Chand, supported by the chief of Guler. This pivotal clash unfolded in the Rehlu region, near present-day Rait village. There, Sansar Chand orchestrated a surprise attack that proved to be decisive. The intensity of the battle was palpable, and amidst the chaos, Raja Raj Singh of Chamba met his demise on the battlefield, at Nerti. His death dealt a severe blow to the Chamba-Nurpur alliance, ultimately leading to the rout of their combined forces. As a consequence of the Battle of Rehlu, the territory of Rohlu passed into the hands of the Katoch chief. This contributed to the expansion of Sansar Chand's influence in the region. Despite the victory, the Rehlu fort remained under the control of Chamba.

=== Conflict with Sikhs and Gurkhas ===
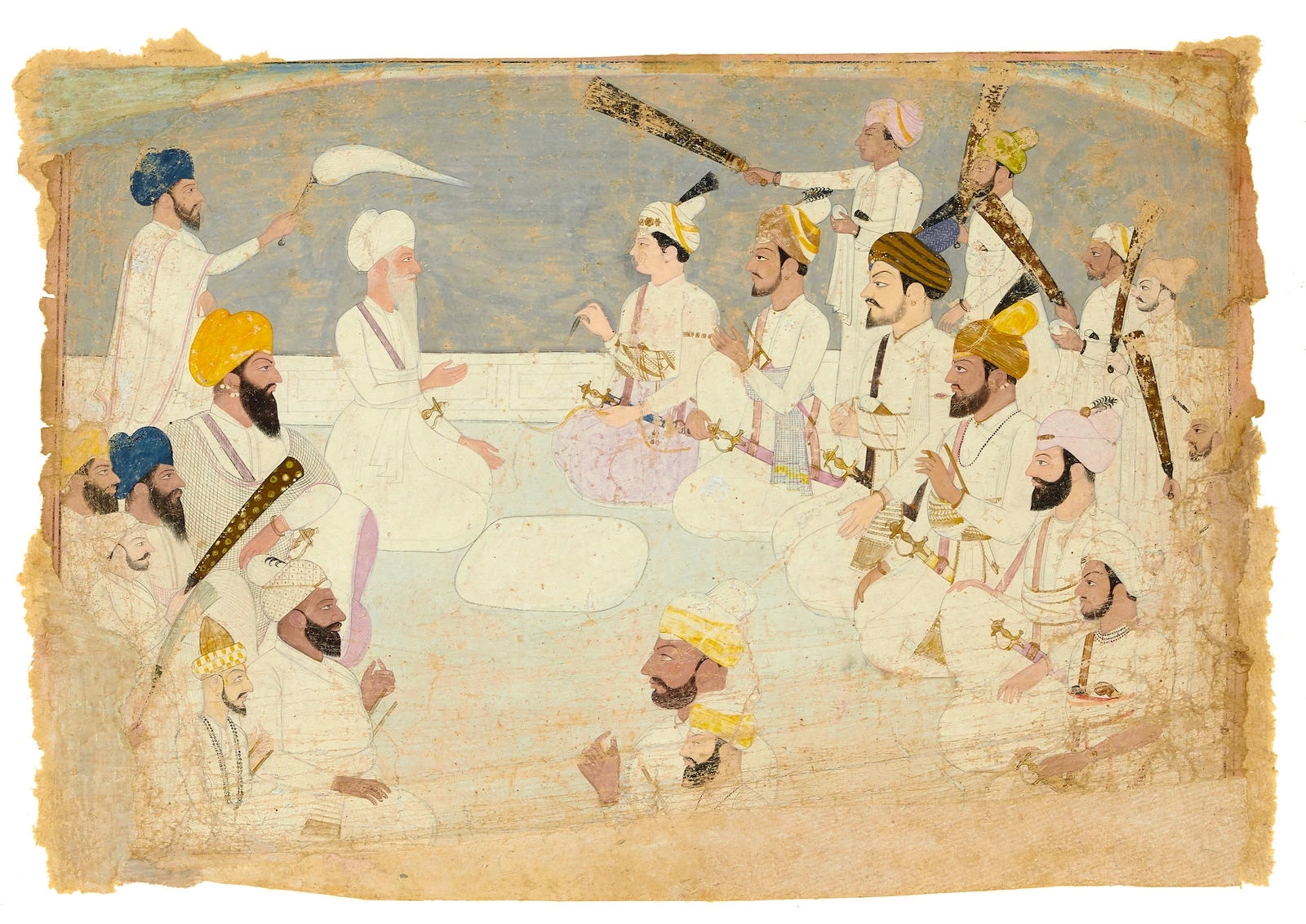
Kangra painting of a darbar (court) scene with Sansar Chand of Kangra and Jai Singh Kanhaiya, circa 18th or 19th century

During the campaign, Sansar Chand and his mercenary force overran other nearby principalities and compelled the submission of their rulers. He reigned over a relatively large part of present-day Himachal Pradesh for some two decades, but his ambitions brought him into conflict with the Gurkhas ruling the then-nascent state of Nepal. The Gorkhas and the recently humbled hill-states allied to invade Kangra in 1806. Sansar Chand was defeated and left with no territory beyond the immediate vicinity of the fortress of Kangra. They managed to defeat Sansar Chand Katoch, the ruler of Kangra, in 1806 with the help of many provincial chiefs. However, the Gorkhas could not capture Kangra Fort which came under Maharaja Ranjit Singh in 1809. One of his forts is situated in the city of Nadaun.

== Later years ==
Sansar Chand retired to the estates thus conferred upon him by Ranjit Singh and devoted his remaining years to cultural pursuits. He died in 1824, and was succeeded in his estates and titles by his son Anirudh Chand. The estate, which came under British suzerainty in 1846, was held by the progeny of Anirudh Chand until 1947, when it acceded unto the Dominion of India.

== Personal life ==
Apart from his son Anirudh Chand, Sansar Chand had two daughters by his wife, Prasanna Devi. Both of them were wed to the Raja Sudarshan Shah of Tehri Garhwal. Sansar Chand also had issue by his second wife, a commoner Rajput lady Gulab Dasi;also a son Raja Jodhbir Chand who established princely state of Nadaun. This is where Maharaja Sansar Chand spent his last days. Two of his daughters were married to Ranjit Singh.

== Legacy ==
He is remembered as a patron of the arts, and the Kangra paintings.

A museum to honour Maharaja Sansar Chand has been set up by the members of the Katoch Dynasty. The museum is located near the Kangra Fort and houses the private collection of the Royal Family of Kangra.

== See also ==
- Kangra district
- History of Himachal Pradesh
