= Kangra Fort =

Fort in Himachal Padesh, India

Coordinates: 32°05′17.1″N 76°15′28″E

- Part of Himachal Pradesh
- Kangra, Himachal Pradesh, India
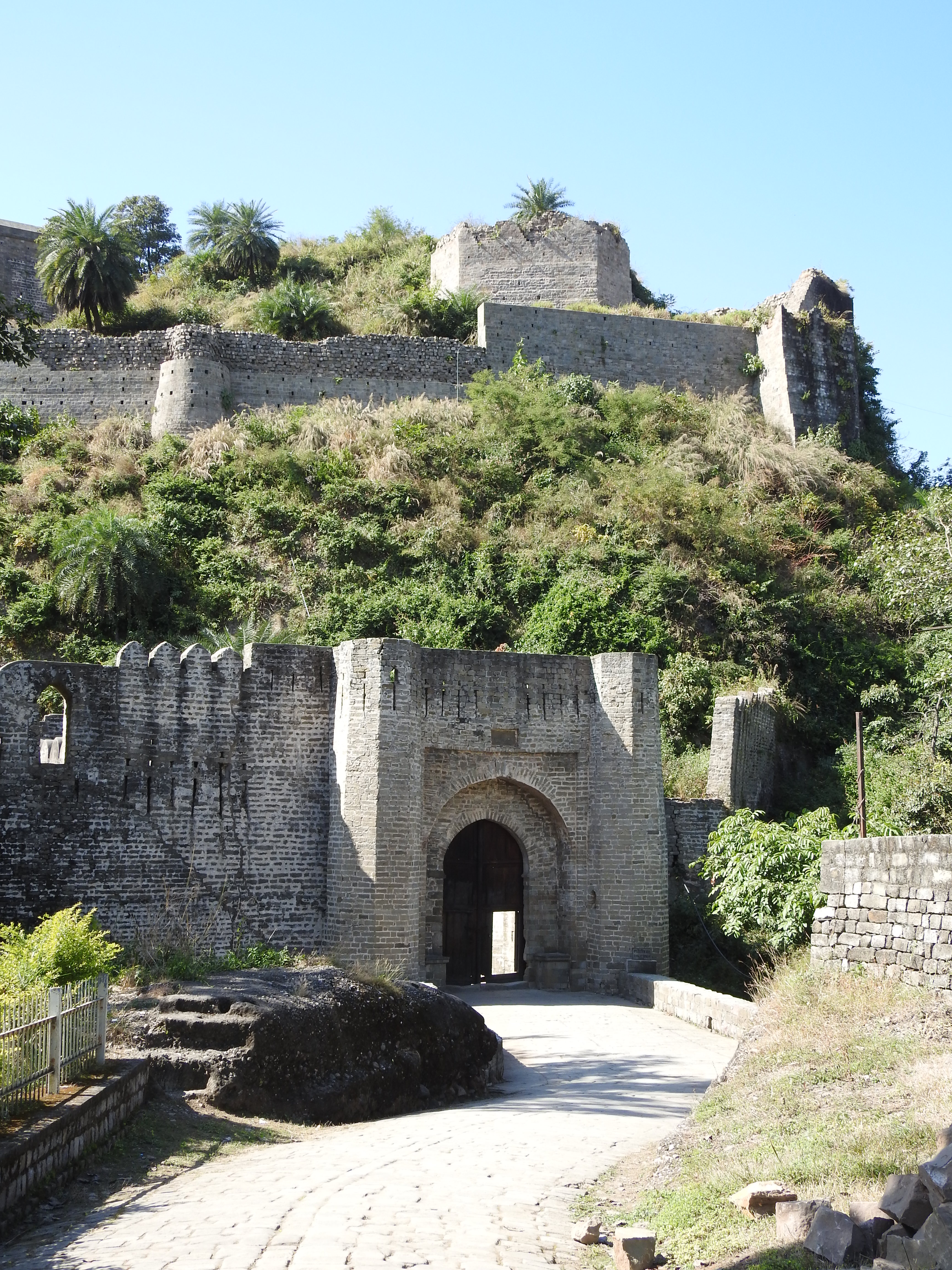
- Kangra Fort

Site information
- Type: Fort
- Controlled by: Kangra State
- Condition: Ruins

Location
- Height: 700 meters

Site history
- Built by: Katoch Dynasty

The Kangra Fort is a historic fort located in the Kangra district of Himachal Pradesh, India. The fort is also known as 'Nagarkot' and 'Kot Kangra'. This fort stands on a hillock between two rivers (Manjhi and Banganga), among the foothills of the Dhauladhar range. The fort is the largest in the Indian Himalayas, and is under the protection of the Archaeological Survey of India. The Kangra Fort is also the oldest fort in the Himalayas, and also found mentions in Indian mythology, along with historical mentions spanning approximately 4,000 years.

== Location ==
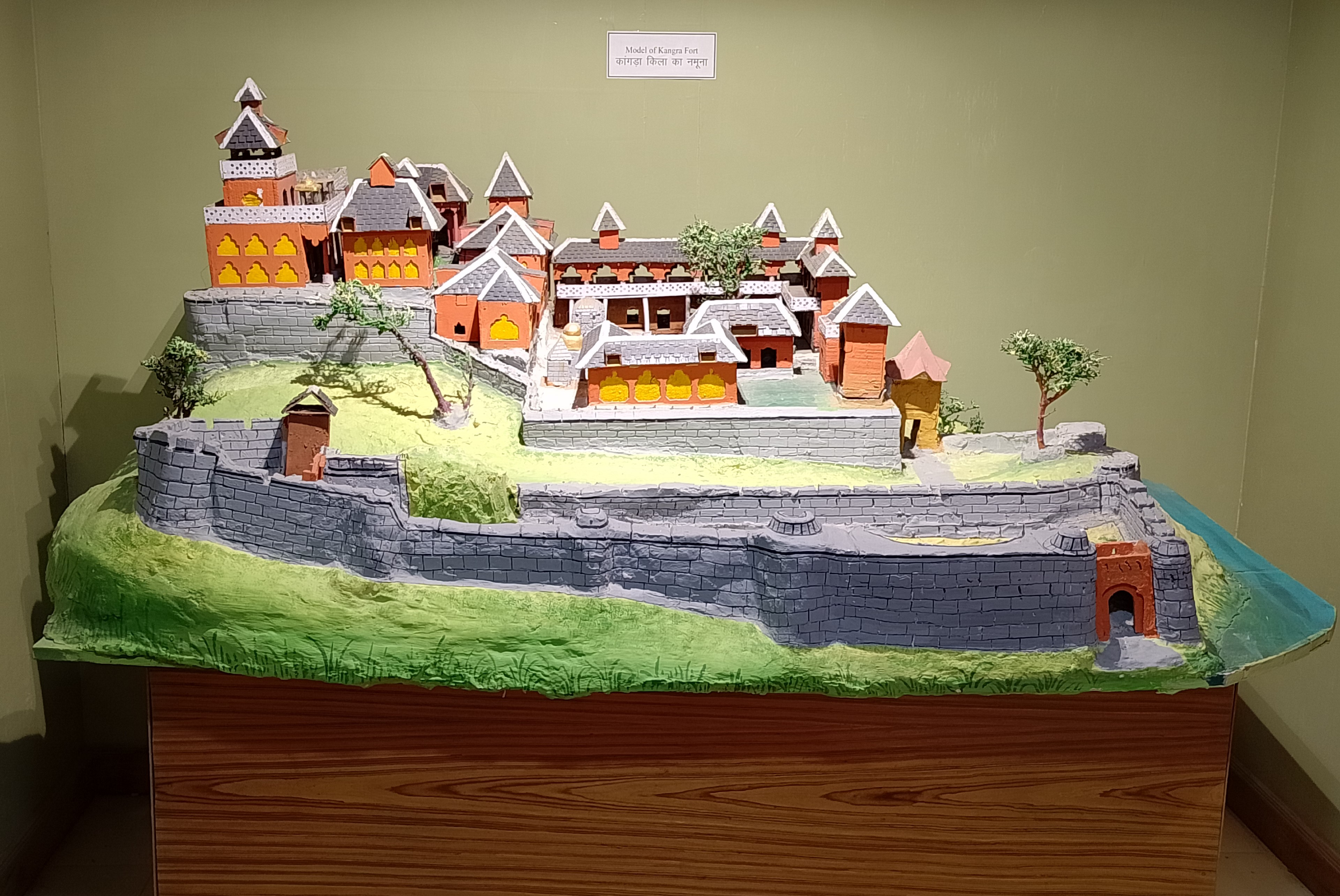
Kangra Fort miniature at Museum of Kangra Art Dharamshala

The Kangra Fort is located 20 kilometers (12 mi) from the town of Dharamsala on the outskirts of the town of Kangra, in Kangra district.

== History ==
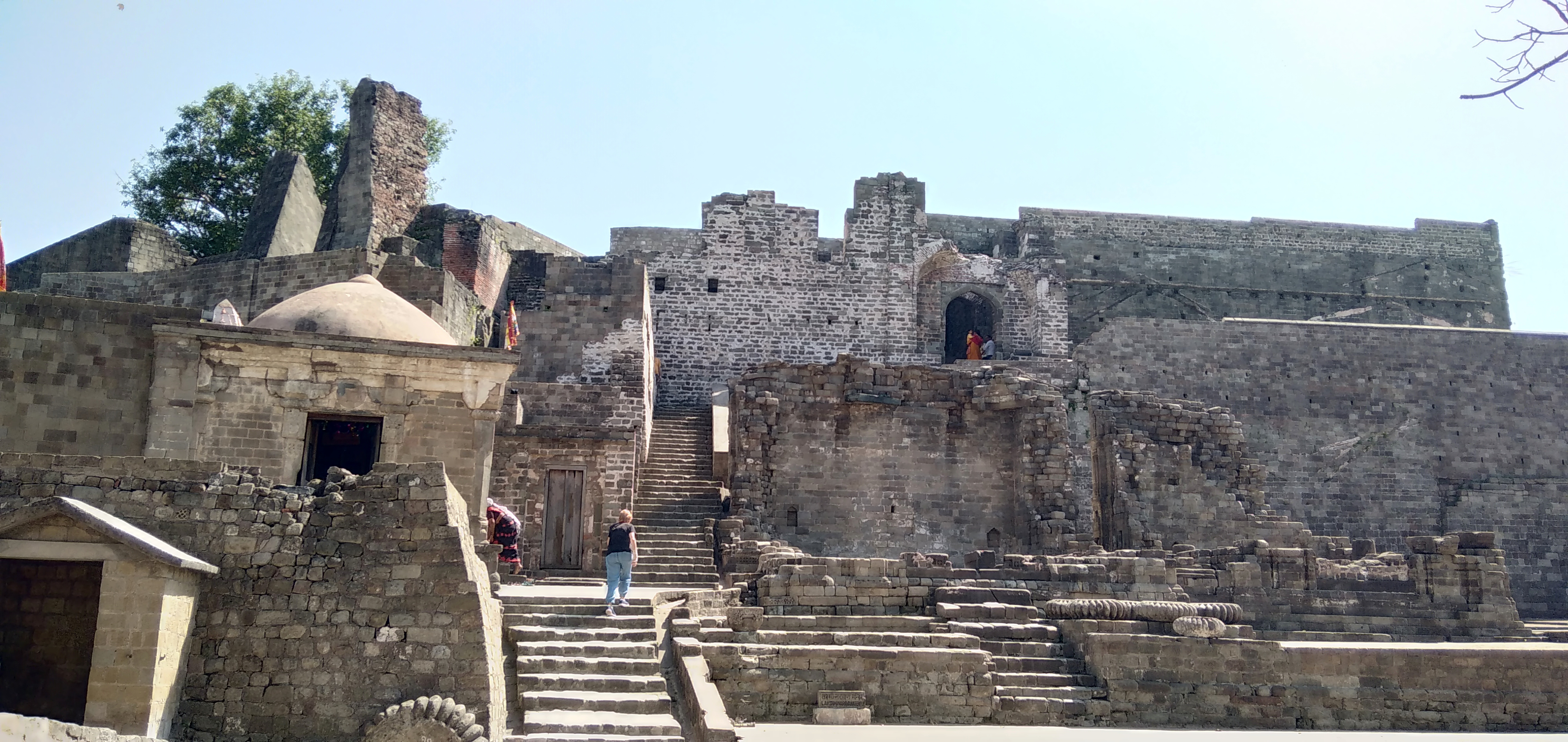
Kangra Fort

Kangra Fort was built by the Katoch Dynasty of Rajputs.

The earliest still existing remains inside the fort are Jain and Hindu temples dated to c. 9th–10th century AD The earliest recorded reference to the Kangra fort dates from the time of this fort's invasion by Mahmud Ghazni in 1009 A.D. The fort was captured by Muhammad bin Tughluq in 1337 A.D., and by his successor Firuz Shah Tughluq in 1351 A.D. respectively.

Khawas Khan Marwat, a superior general of Sher Shah Suri, managed to capture the fort in 1540 AD.

Raja Dharam Chand submitted to the Mughal Ruler Akbar in 1556 and agreed to pay tribute, including, renouncing claims to the fort. But in 1620, Emperor Jahangir killed the Katoch king, Raja Hari Chand and annexed the Kangra kingdom into the Mughal Empire. Under the leadership of Nawab Ali Khan and aided by Raja Jagat Singh, the fort was captured in 1620 and remained under Mughal rule until 1783. In 1621, Jahangir visited it and ordered the slaughter of a bullock there. A mosque was also built within the fort of Kangra.

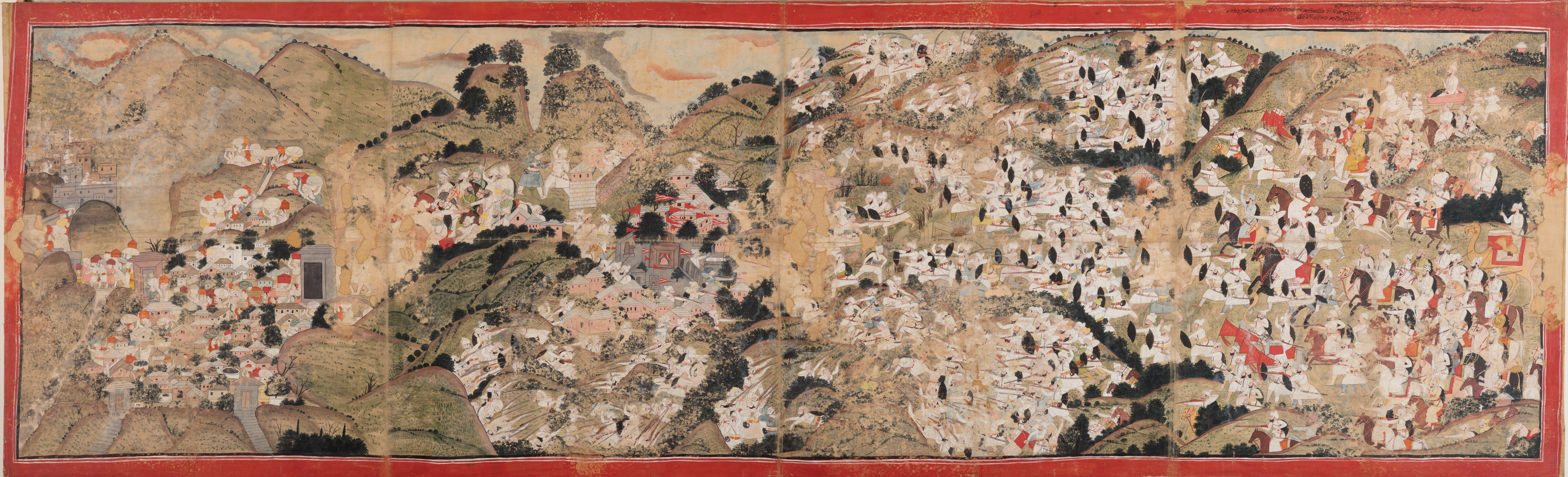
Raja Sansar Chand attacking Kangra Fort, ca.1782

As the Mughal empire began to crumble, a descendant of Raja Dharam Chand, Raja Sansar Chand II began a series of conquests of Kangra with the support of Sikh leader, Jai Singh Kanhaiya of the Kanhaiya misl. However, after the death of Mughal governor Saif Ali Khan, the fort was surrendered in 1783 by his son to the Sikh leader, Jai Singh Kanhaiya of the Kanhaiya Misl in return for safe passage. This betrayal by Jai Singh Kanhaiya led to Raja Sansar Chand soliciting the services of Sikh misaldars Maha Singh of the Sukerchakia Misl (father of Maharaja Ranjit Singh) and Jassa Singh Ramgarhia and besieged the fort. In 1786, Raja Sansar Chand gained Kangra fort by peaceful treaty with Jai Singh Kanhaiya in return for territorial concessions in the Punjab.

Sansar Chand quickly focused on expanding his kingdom and conquered the nearby kingdoms of Chamba, Mandi, Suket and Nahan. In 1805 he turned his attention to Bilaspur and the erstwhile Raja of Bilaspur called on the aid of the powerful Gurkha kingdom, who had already acquired Garhwal, Sirmour and other small hill states of Shimla. An army of 40,000 Gurkhas leading by the Kaji Amar Singh Thapa, who was later reinforced by the Kaji Nain Singh Thapa. In 1807, Kangra Fort, on the west bank of the Sutlej, was put under siege. By early 1809, most of the land of Kangra jagir had been incorporated into Nepal, although the fort still held out. Raja Sansar Chand of Kangra then turned towards Maharaja Ranjit Singh of Lahore for aid, leading to the Nepal-Sikh war of 1809 in which the Gurkhas were defeated and forced back to the satluj River. In return for his help, Maharaja Ranjit Singh took possession of the ancient fort alongside 66 villages (the fort's ancient Jagir) on Aug 24, 1809 while leaving the rest of Kangra to Sansar Chand.During Sikh Empire Period Maharaja Ranjit Singh built an Entrance Gate to The Kangra Fort which is First Gate on Entry to the Fort and the Last Gate build or added in the Structure of Fort, This Gate is commonly referred as Ranjit Singh Gate or Sometimes as Ranjit Singh Dwaar/Darwaza.

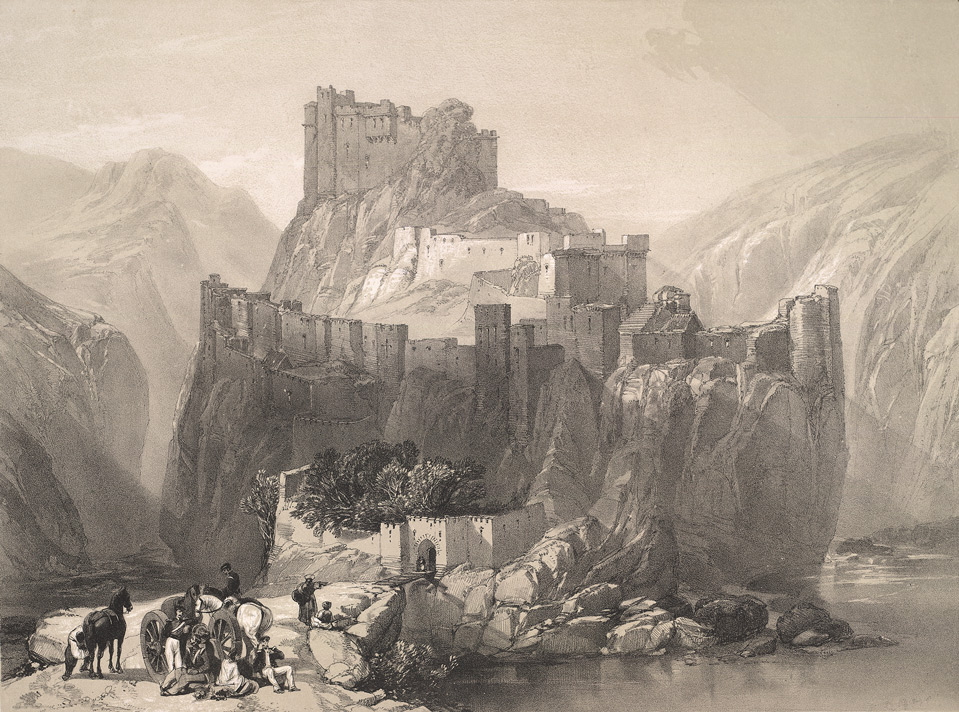
Kangra fort in 1847, by Charles Hardinge

The fort was finally taken by the British during the First Anglo-Sikh war after a six-week long siege. This siege was fought from mid-April to 28 May 1846. Sir Henry Lawrence reached the fort on 3 May 1846. This was the only battle fought between the Sikh forces of Kangra and the British. The British controlled the valley after defeating them and the fort.

A British garrison occupied the fort until it was heavily damaged in an earthquake on 4 April 1905.

== Layout ==
The entrance to the fort is through a small courtyard enclosed between two gates which were built during the Sikh period, as appears from an inscription over the entrance. From here a long and narrow passage leads up to the top of the fort, through the Ahani and Amiri Darwaza (gate), both attributed to Nawab Saif Ali Khan, the first Mughal Governor of Kangra. About 500 feet from the outer gate the passage turns round at a very sharp angle and passes through the Jehangiri Darwaza. The area Kangra Fort is spread across 463 acres.

The Darsani Darwaza, which is now flanked by defaced statues of River Goddesses Ganga and Yamuna gave access to a courtyard, along the south side of which stood the stone shrines of Lakshmi-Narayana and Ambika Devi and a Svetambara Jain temple with large idol of Rishabhanatha.

== In Jainism ==
Kangra was once an important center of Jainism. According to a local legend, King Suśarmācandra, after hearing the importance of Mount Shatrunjaya, took a vow to not eat or drink anything until he pays homage to Rishabhanatha at Palitana temples. Pleased by his devotion and to save him from starvation, demigoddess Ambika created a temple of Rishabhanatha at the king's fort. After paying homage to the idol, the king broke his fast.

Within the premises of Kangra Fort lies an idol of Rishabhanatha. The inscription on the pedestal of the idol is in Śāradā script. It mentions that the idol was consecrated by Śvetāmbara monk Amalacandra, a disciple of Ācārya Abhaycandra of the Rājakula Gachha in 854 CE. The granite idol of Rishabhanatha is seated in Padmāsana posture. An icon of bull carved on its pedestal indicates that the idol is of Rishabhanatha. However, another important trait of this idol is that it does not feature a waistband and a waistcloth, as most commonly found in Śvetāmbara icons of Tirthankaras after Bappabhattisuri's era. Locks of hair carved on both sides of the head of the idol as well as an inscription from 854 CE, however, make it clear that the idol and the temple is of the Śvetāmbara sect of Jainism as noted by archaeologist Sir John Marshall. Once a thriving Jaina center, it soon went unnoticed after migration of Jainas out of the town. The idol of Rishabhanatha was found in the Indreśvara Temple. Later on, efforts to reinstall the idol were made by Śvetāmbara Jaina nun Mrugavati, a disciple of Ācārya Vijayavallabhsuri. In 1978, the idol was installed in an independent shrine within Kangra Fort. Currently, the idol is under the care of the Archeological Survey of India, but Jainas are given the right to worship the idol.

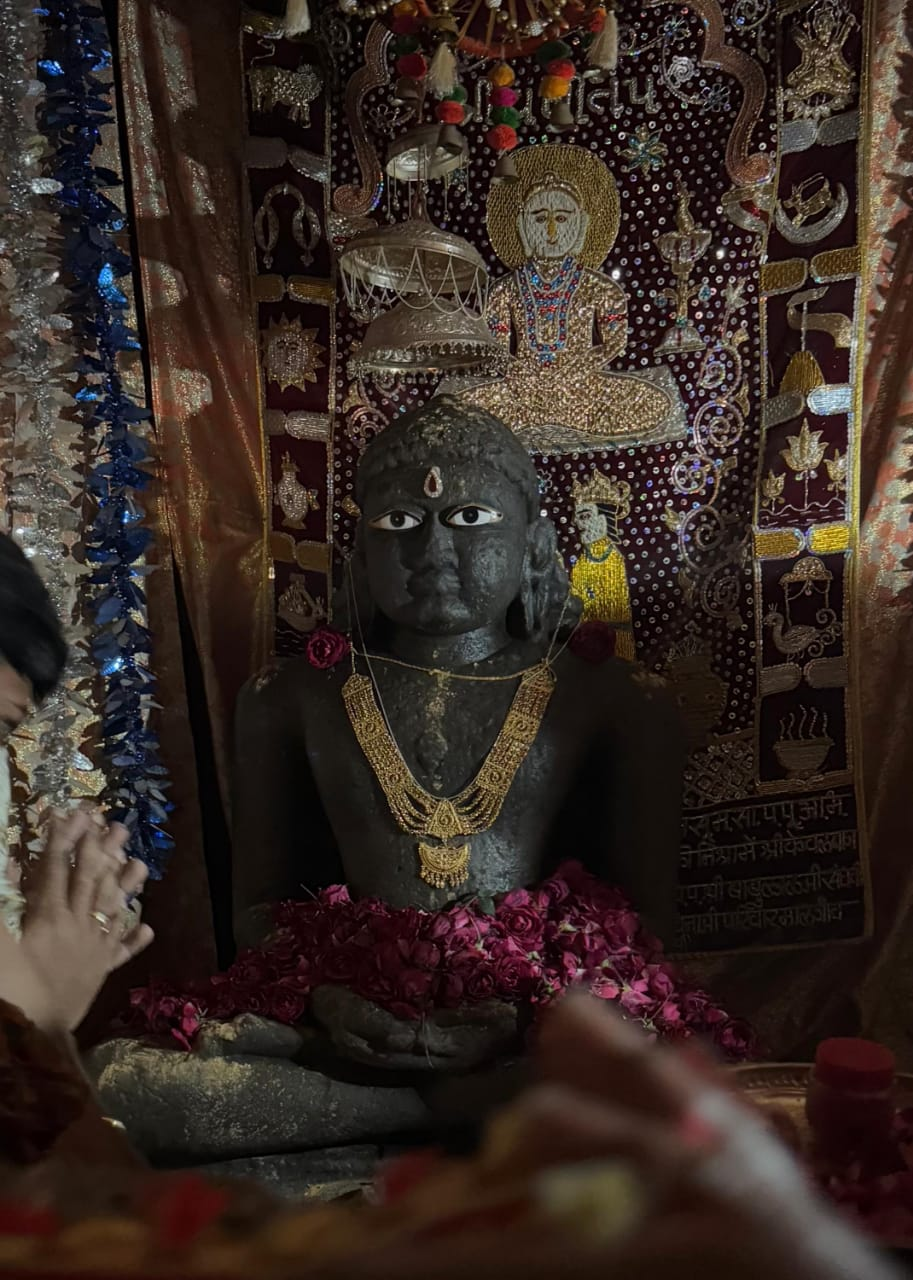
Idol of Rishabhanatha decorated with flowers and ornaments as per Śvetāmbara rituals

Dr. K. N. Sitaram, on his tour to Kangra Valley in 1930, discovered numerous remains of Jaina idols and temples. He also noted that several Jaina idols and temples were appropriated by Hindus under different names of Hindu deities.

In 1916, Muni Jinavijaya published Vijnaptitriveni, which is a detailed report about the author's pilgrimage to Nagarkot and Kangra. It explains the journey of pilgrims from Faridpur to Nagarkot. It also highlights that the pilgrims return from Nagarkot to Faridpur through another route. It also describes a war between Yasoratha, a Khokhar chief and Sikandara, a Muslim ruler.
