= Kangra, Himachal Pradesh =

City in Himachal Pradesh, India

Kangra Nagarkot
- City
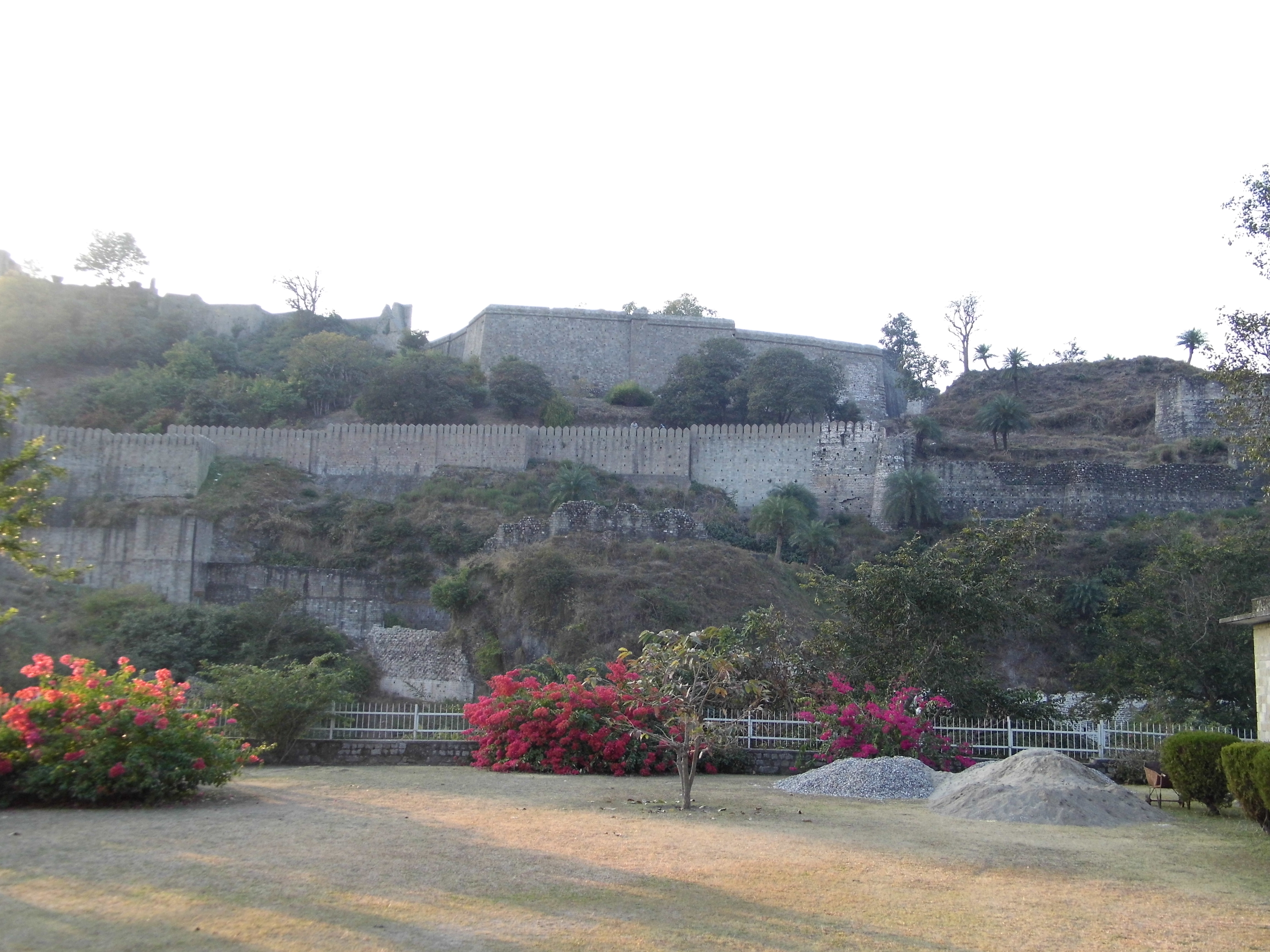

- Location in Himachal Pradesh, India Kangra (India)
- Coordinates: 32°06′11″N 76°16′24″E
- Country: India
- State: Himachal Pradesh
- District: Kangra
- Established: 1500 B.C
- Founder: Susharma Chand (234th ruler) in 1500 BC

Government
  - Type: Municipality

Area
  - Total: 15 km^{2} (5.8 sq mi)
- Elevation: 733 m (2,405 ft)

Population (2011)
  - Total: 9,528 Urban
  - Rank: 17 in HP
  - Density: 640/km^{2} (1,600/sq mi)

Languages
  - Official: Hindi
  - Additional official: Sanskrit
  - Regional: Kangri
- Time zone: UTC+5:30 (IST)
- Postal code: 176001
- Vehicle registration: HP-36, HP-37, HP-38, HP-39, HP-40, HP-53, HP-54, HP-56, HP-68, HP-83, HP-88, HP-90, HP-94, HP-96, HP-97

Kangra, historically known as Nagarkot, is a city and a municipal council in the Kangra Valley, within the Kangra district of the Indian state of Himachal Pradesh.

== Etymology ==
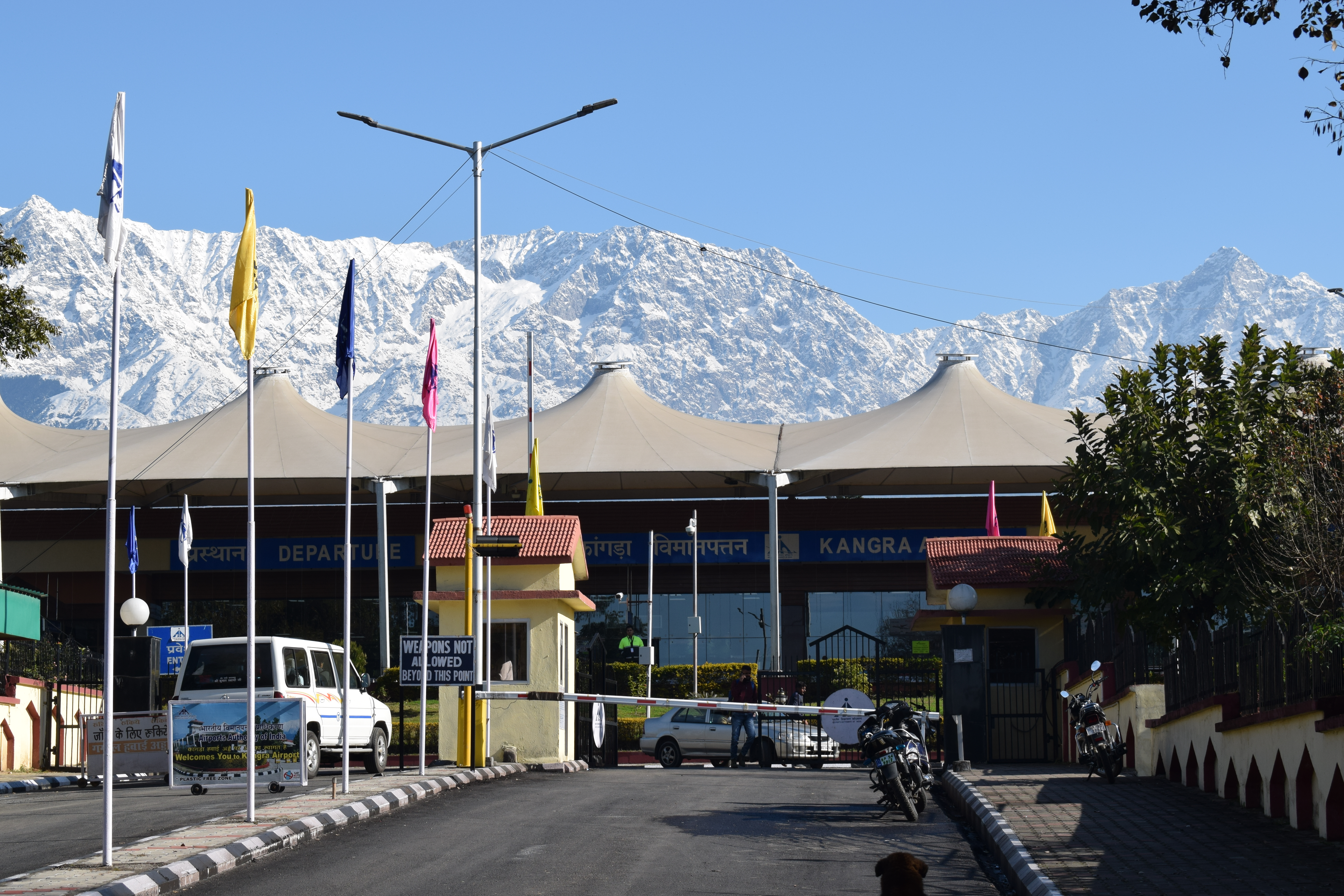
Kangra

The word Kangri in Ladakhi–Lahauli means snow on top of mountain. Since snow capped mountains are visible from the city of Kangra, therefore it is named Kangra (town of snow laden peaks).

== History ==
Historically known as Kiraj and Trigarta, the town of Kangra was historically ruled by Katoch Rajputs. The Katoch rulers had a stronghold here, with a fort and lavish temples. Another ancient name of the city is Bhimanagar, supposedly after Bhimadeva, the Shahi ruler of Gandhara.

The temple of Devi Vajreshwari was one of the oldest and wealthiest in northern India. It was destroyed, together with the fort and the town, by the 1905 Kangra earthquake on 4 April 1905, in which 1339 people died in Kangra alone, along with about 20,000 elsewhere. In 1855, the headquarters of the district were removed to the cantonment of Dharmsala, which was established in 1849.

=== Early invasions ===
It is said that Mahmud of Ghazni looted the Shri Bajreshwari Mata Mandir. He also looted a fort in the region in 1009, but whether the fort of Kangra was taken or not is not yet historically verified. There were hundreds of well-defended forts that lay between Ghazni and Nagarkot fort, and so it highly unlikely that his looting expedition ever reached Kangra. Also, this claim is negated by historians who have cited various sources to say that the fort was impregnable and remained unconquered until the conquest by Mughal emperor Jahangir in 1622.

=== The 19th-century battles ===
The fort was recaptured by the Katoch kings after Jahangir's death. Multiple battles ensued between the Sikh emperor Ranjit Singh and the Katoch king Sansar Chand. But, while the war between the Sikhs and Katochs was taking place, the gates of Kangra Fort were left open. The Gurkha army entered the opened gates of Nagarkot fort in 1806. This forced an alliance between the battling Sikhs and Katochs, and both the armies re-captured the fort after a battle in 1809. Kangra stayed with the Katoch kings until 1810 when maharaja Ranjit Singh annexed it after Sansar Chand's death. Later the Nepalese Gorkha captured Kangra until the British conquered it. The historical Nepal extended from Tista River upto Kangra in the west. After the Sugauli Treaty around 1816, British seized westernmost parts of Nepal, which include present-day Uttarakhand. These territories were merged into British India. The fort and city were then captured by the British in 1846 and remained occupied until India's independence.

=== In British India ===
The princely state of Kangra was merged in India in 1948 by the then titled raja of Kangra-Lambagraon namely raja Druv Dev Chand Katoch.

== Geography ==
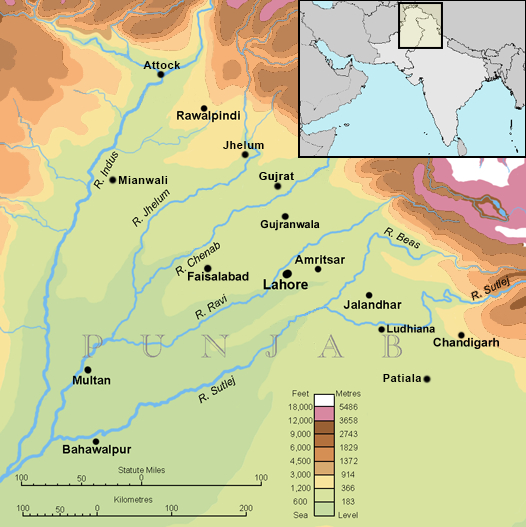
A map of the Punjab region.

Kangra has an average elevation of 733 metres (2404 ft). The district of Kangra extends from the Jalandhar Doab far into the southern ranges of the Himalaya. It is a town at the confluence of the Baner River and Majhi River, and Beas is an important river here.

== Climate ==
Climate data for Kangra Airport (1991–2020)
Month	Jan	Feb	Mar	Apr	May	Jun	Jul	Aug	Sep	Oct	Nov	Dec	Year
Record high °C (°F)	24.5 (76.1)	28.1 (82.6)	33.7 (92.7)	38.2 (100.8)	42.3 (108.1)	42.0 (107.6)	40.5 (104.9)	35.0 (95.0)	34.4 (93.9)	33.1 (91.6)	28.7 (83.7)	26.4 (79.5)	42.3 (108.1)
Mean daily maximum °C (°F)	18.5 (65.3)	21.8 (71.2)	25.1 (77.2)	30.9 (87.6)	34.3 (93.7)	34.7 (94.5)	31.1 (88.0)	30.3 (86.5)	30.8 (87.4)	29.6 (85.3)	24.6 (76.3)	20.7 (69.3)	27.5 (81.5)
Mean daily minimum °C (°F)	5.2 (41.4)	7.8 (46.0)	10.4 (50.7)	15.4 (59.7)	18.3 (64.9)	21.1 (70.0)	21.9 (71.4)	21.8 (71.2)	19.6 (67.3)	14.0 (57.2)	9.4 (48.9)	5.4 (41.7)	14.0 (57.2)
Record low °C (°F)	−2.0 (28.4)	1.1 (34.0)	2.8 (37.0)	8.0 (46.4)	12.5 (54.5)	13.6 (56.5)	18.4 (65.1)	17.2 (63.0)	14.0 (57.2)	9.2 (48.6)	4.2 (39.6)	−0.6 (30.9)	−2.0 (28.4)
Average rainfall mm (inches)	72.0 (2.83)	77.9 (3.07)	85.6 (3.37)	57.4 (2.26)	75.7 (2.98)	202.1 (7.96)	611.5 (24.07)	817.5 (32.19)	205.4 (8.09)	11.4 (0.45)	11.3 (0.44)	39.7 (1.56)	2,267.4 (89.27)
Average rainy days	4.5	5.0	6.2	4.0	5.2	7.6	19.0	20.3	8.5	0.8	1.3	1.7	84.1
Average relative humidity (%) (at 17:30 IST)	63	56	51	40	34	46	76	82	74	59	63	66	59
Source: India Meteorological Department

== Economy ==
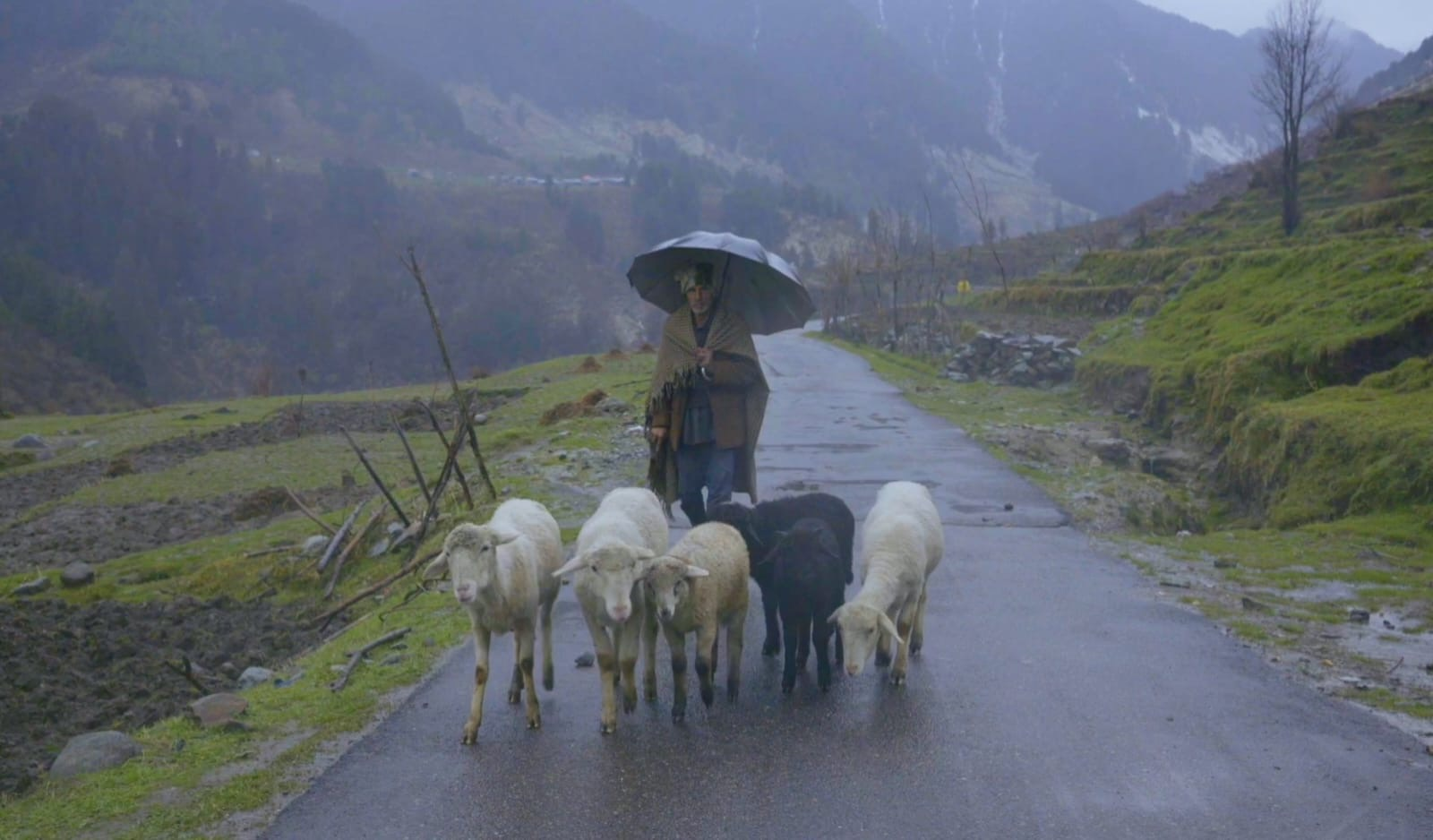
A Gaddi Shepherd with sheep in Chotta Bhanghal, Kangra

Tea cultivation was introduced into Kangra valley about 1850. The Palampur fair, established by the government with a view to fostering commerce with Central Asia, attracts a small concourse of Yarkandi merchants. The Lahulis carry on an enterprising trade with Ladakh and countries beyond the frontier, by means of the pack sheep and goats. Rice, tea, potatoes, spices, wool and honey are the chief exports.

== Visitor attractions ==
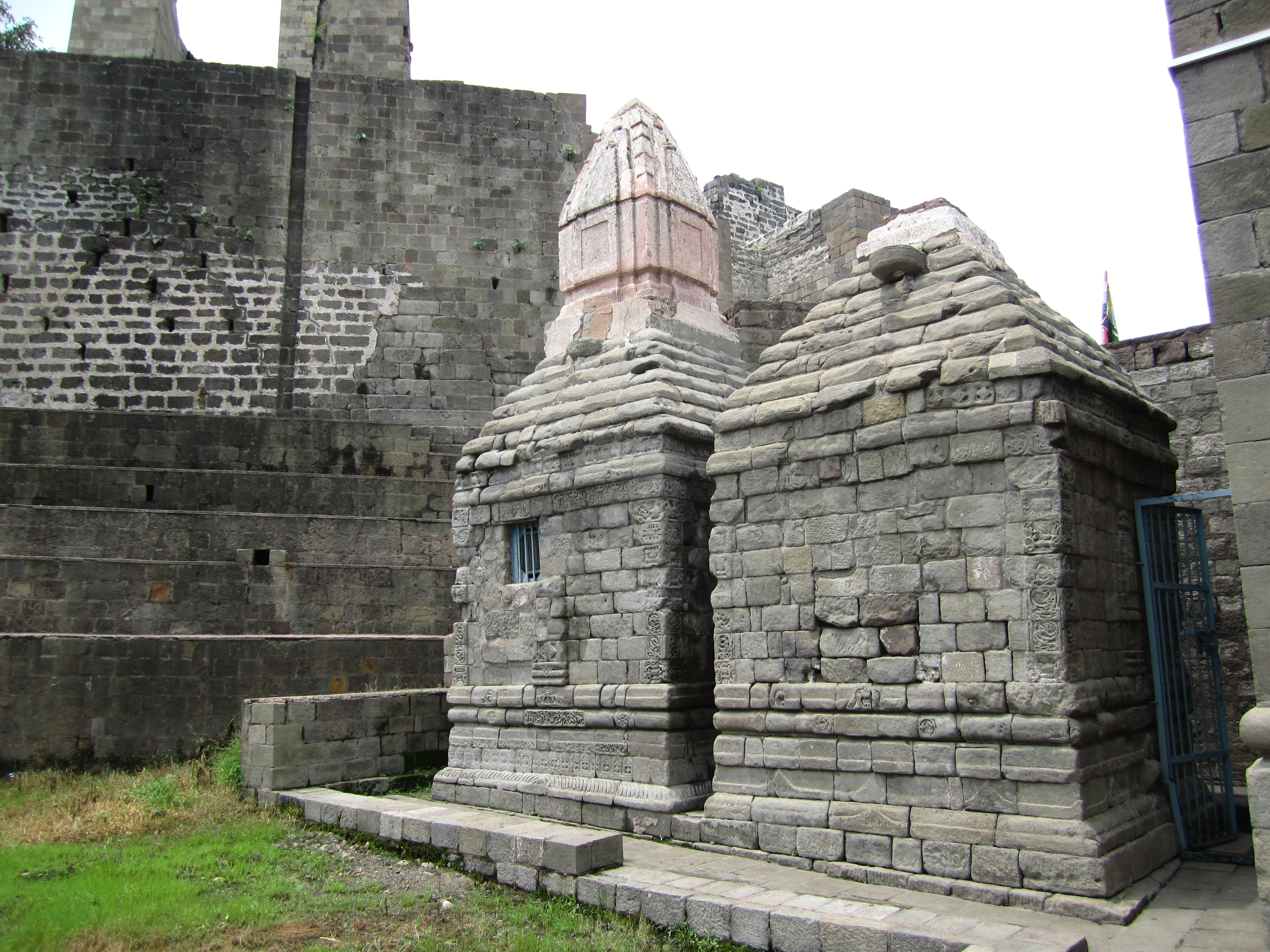
Ambika Mata temple, Kangra Fort

The Kangra Fort is also a popular tourist attraction. It is one of the oldest forts in India as well as the oldest in Himachal Pradesh.

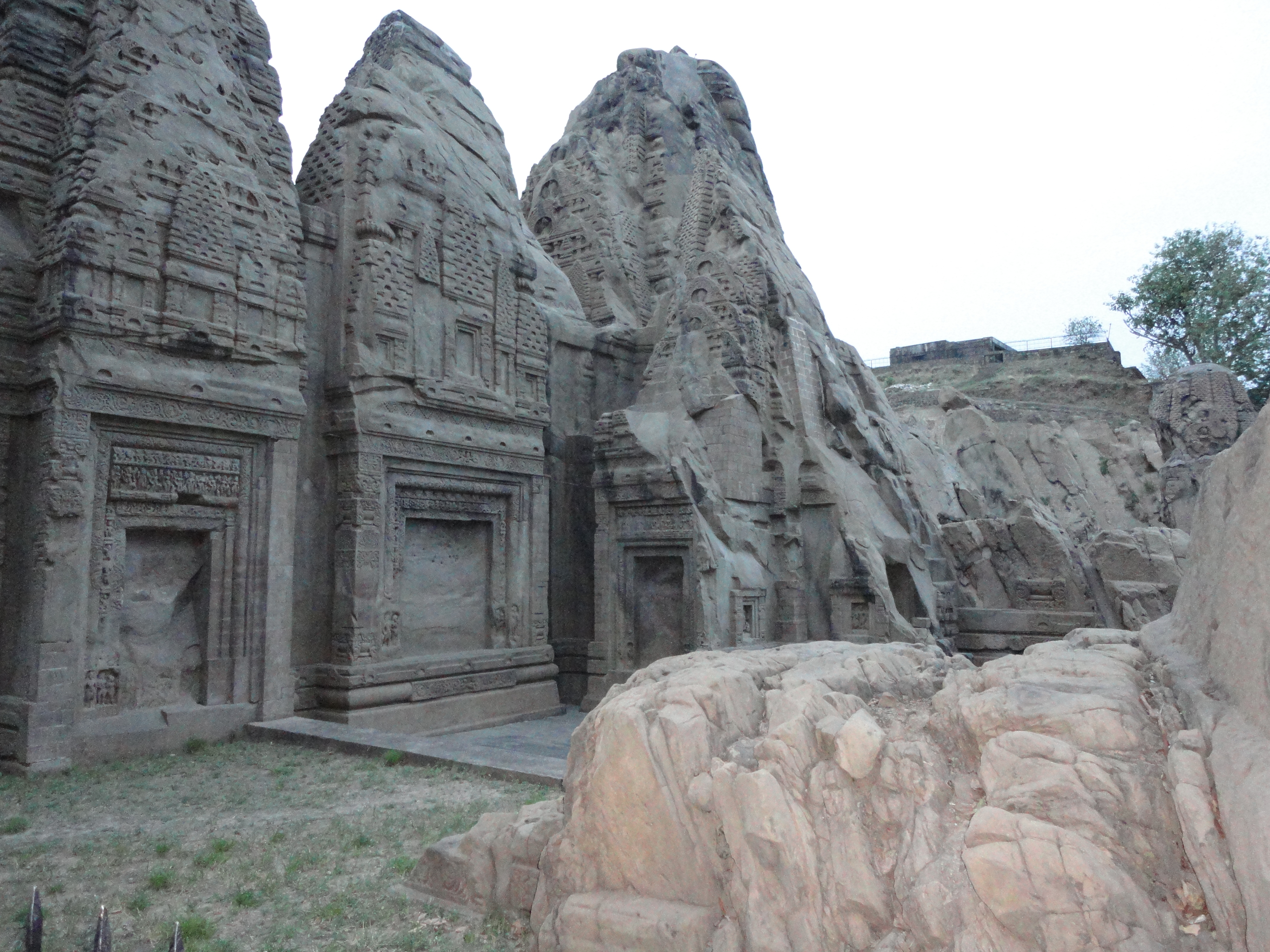
Rock Cut Temple, Masroor

It is the home of Masroor Rock Cut Temple built by the Pandavas, also known as Himalayan Pyramids.

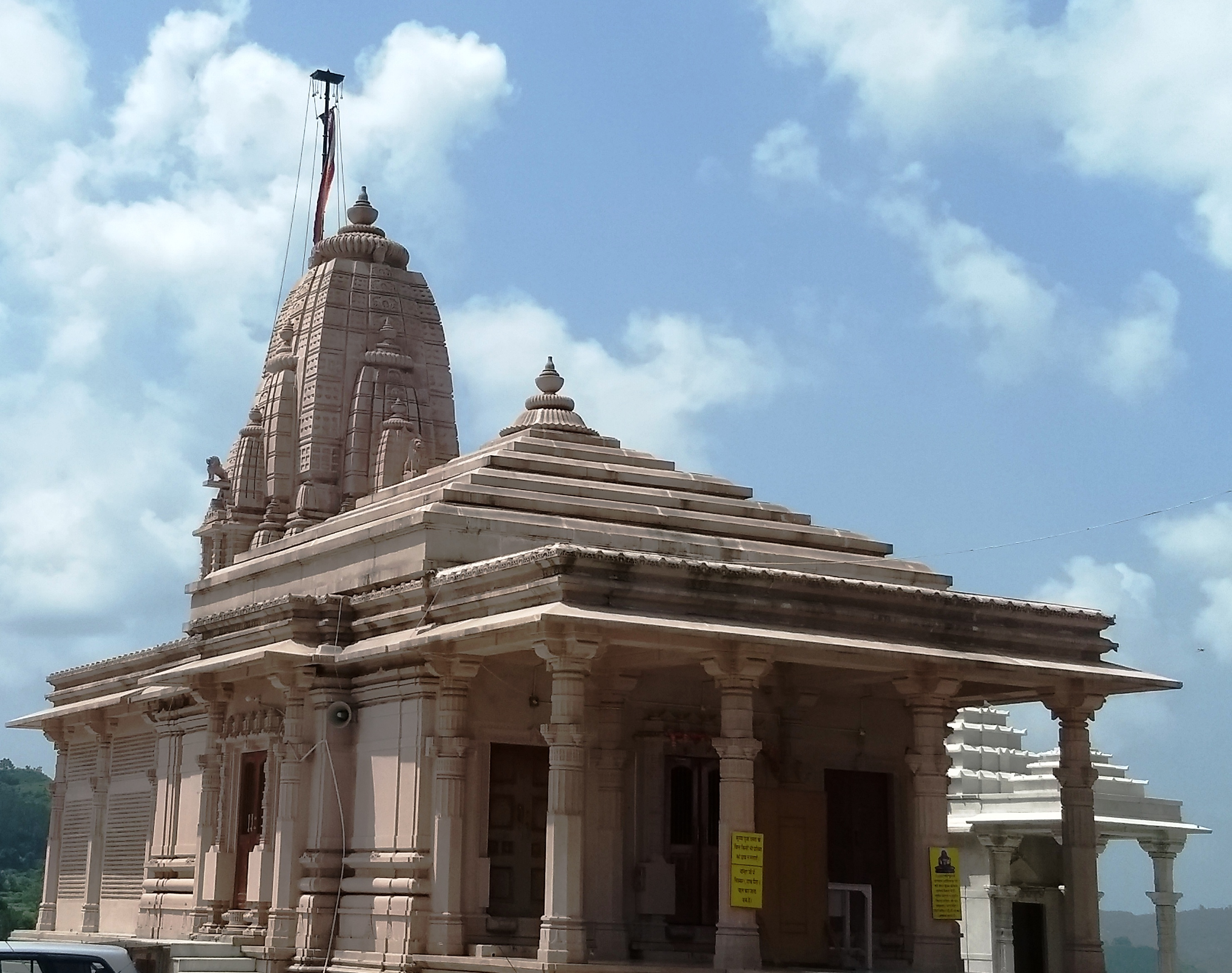
Kangra Śvetāmbara Jain Temple

Many ancient temples such as the Kangra Śvetāmbara Jain Temple, Jawalaji, Chamunda Devi temple, Chintapurni temple, Baba Baroh and Baijnath temple are located here.

Gopalpur Nature Park in Gopalpur village has tea gardens.

Mcleodganj near Dharamshala is the home-in-exile to the Dalai Lama. The Bhagsunag Temple is located there. The Himachal Pradesh Cricket Association Stadium in Dharamshala is also an attraction because of its location in front of the snow-capped mountains

== Demographics ==
The 2001 India census states that Kangra had a population of 9,154. Males constitute 50% of the population and females 50%. Kangra has an average literacy rate of 83%, higher than the national average of 59.5%: male literacy is 85%, and female literacy is 81%. In Kangra, 10% of the population is under 6 years of age.

=== Demographics ===
As of 2001 India census,

- Number of Households - 1,924
- Average Household Size(per Household) - 5.0
- Population-Total - 10,185
- Population-Urban - 10,185
- Proportion of Urban Population (%) - 100
- Population-Rural - 0
- Sex Ratio - 997
- Population (0-6 Years) - 902
- Sex Ratio (0-6 Years) - 797
- SC Population - 660
- Sex Ratio (SC) - 1050
- Proportion of SC (%) - 7.0
- ST Population - 10
- Sex Ratio (ST) -150 0
- Proportion of ST (%) - 0
- Literates - 7,567
- Illiterates - 1,589
- Literacy Rate (%) - 92.0

== Economy ==
Historically driven by tea production, Kangra has diversified into tourism, agriculture, and professional services.

== Transport ==
Kangra Airport (IATA airport code DHM) is 10 km to the city's north. It is served by Kangra Valley Railway line from Pathankot 94 km away. It is connected by road with other cities in Himachal Pradesh and India. It is 450 km from Delhi, 36 km from Palampur and 15 km from Dharamshala, 220 km from Chandigarh.

== See also ==
- Kangra painting
