= Katoch =

Clan of Rajputs in India

Katoch is a Rajput clan of India. Their areas of residence are mainly in the Indian states of Himachal Pradesh, Punjab, and Uttarakhand, and the Union territory of Jammu and Kashmir.

Katoch Rajput sub-clans include Jaswal, Siba (Sipaiah), Guleria and Dadwal.

== Etymology ==
There are two possible origins for the word Katoch. Members of the clan say it comes from the words Kat (army) and uch (upper class) but other sources say that it comes from kot (fort). The Kangra fort was known as Nagarkot or Kot Kangra, and since the administrators/rulers resided within that particular kot they were vernacularly called "Kot'ch" or कोटच, which means those within the fort. This over time became Katoch.

== History ==
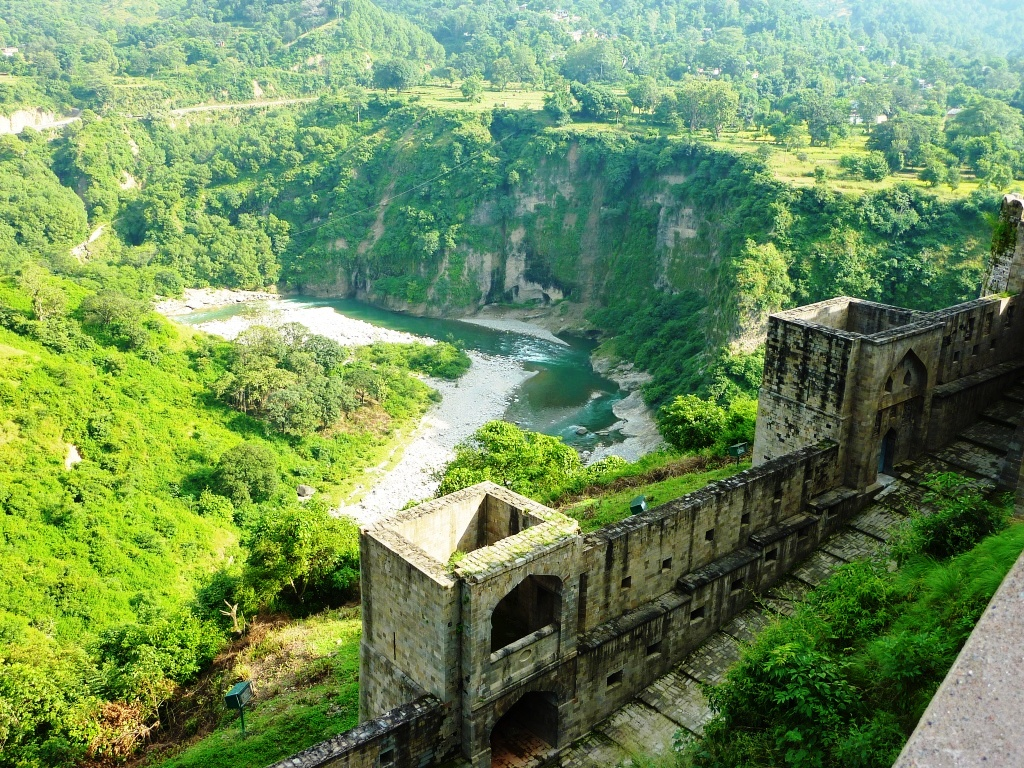
The strategic Kangra Fort commanded the respect of the region.

The main branch of the Katoch clan were the rulers of the Kangra State, which was, by some accounts, the most prominent kingdom between the Ravi and Sutlej in the pre-modern period. The Kangra State was also known as Trigadh, a name derived from the ancient Trigarta Kingdom mentioned in the Mahabharata. The tradition holds that the Katoch were the rulers of Kangra from the times of Mahabharata till the pre-independence era.

In the pre-modern period, the hill states of the modern Himachal Pradesh are said to have constantly warred with each other, despite relations of kinship and intermarriage. In 1333, under the reign of Raja Prithvi Chand, Mohammad Bin Tughlaq attacked Kangra with 100,000 men. Only 10 of them returned to Delhi and were executed by the emperor. Emperor Akbar had failed to conquer them despite a siege of 10 years. Then they were brought under the Mughal suzerainty by the emperor Jehangir. Emperor Jahangir captured the Kangra fort in 1610, annexing the surrounding area. The Mughal control was limited, however. The rulers of the states retained a fair degree of independence.

Multiple attacks by Katochs, Sikhs, and Marathas, led to the decline of the Mughal power. This led Raja Ghamand Chand (r. 1751–1774) to recover the fort and he also recovered most of the territory earlier ceded to the Mughals. His grandson, Maharaja Sansar Chand (r. 1775–1823) established the supremacy of Kangra over all the surrounding hill states and captured lands till Lahore(later lost to Sikh Maharaja Ranjit Singh). During his reign, Kangra became a major centre for the arts and several palaces were built.

In the year 1805, the neighbouring hill states rebelled, with the aid of the Gurkha army. Raja Sansar Chand was forced to seek the help of Maharaja Ranjit Singh of Lahore. By the treaty that followed, The Gurkha army was expelled by Maharajas Sansar Chand and Ranjit Singh. As part of the treaty, Kangra fort was gifted to Maharaja Ranjit Singh, and also annexed the most fertile part of the Kangra valley, reducing the Katochs of Kangra to control all of Kangra except villages surrounding the fort.

After the First Anglo-Sikh War of 1846, the whole area was ceded to the British East India Company, eventually integrated into the Punjab province. The Katochs and the surrounding hill rajas were assigned small jagirs over which they had the rights of revenue and magisterial authority. Eventually, the title of Maharaja was restored to the Katoch clan in 1870 and the Kangra fort was returned to the clan in 1905.

== Clans and surnames ==
The Katoch clan one of the 14 ruling clans of the Himachal Pradesh and Jammu region in the medieval times.

Katochs suffixed 'Chandra' (claiming descent from the mythical Chandravansha or Lunar dynasty mentioned in ancient Indian texts) to their names until the rise of the Sikh dynasty in Punjab, after which some clan members started suffixing 'Singh' also. However, most clan members today, including in the sub-clans, suffix Chand.

Until the reforms of the 1930s, the Katoch women were only married westward, generally to the Pathania and Jamwal/Jamuwal men and vice versa. The higher the sub-clan rated its own status, the farther away towards the west they tended to marry.

== Regions ruled by the clan ==
In past centuries, the clan and its branches ruled several princely states in the region of Trigarta. Trigarta refers to the land between three rivers, namely, Beas, Sutlej, and Ravi. However, the clan lost lands and by the 17th century had been reduced to a small hill state. The originator of the clan was Rajanaka Bhumi Chand. Their rulers include Sansar Chand II and Rajanaka Bhumi Chand, the latter being the founder of the Jwalamukhi temple in Himachal Pradesh.

== See also ==
- History of Himachal Pradesh
- Kangra, Himachal Pradesh
- Kangra district
