= Kangra State =

Historical princely state in India

Coordinates: 32°06′N 76°16′E

- Princely state until 1810; Estate of Lambagraon 1810–1947
- 11th century–1810
- Flag

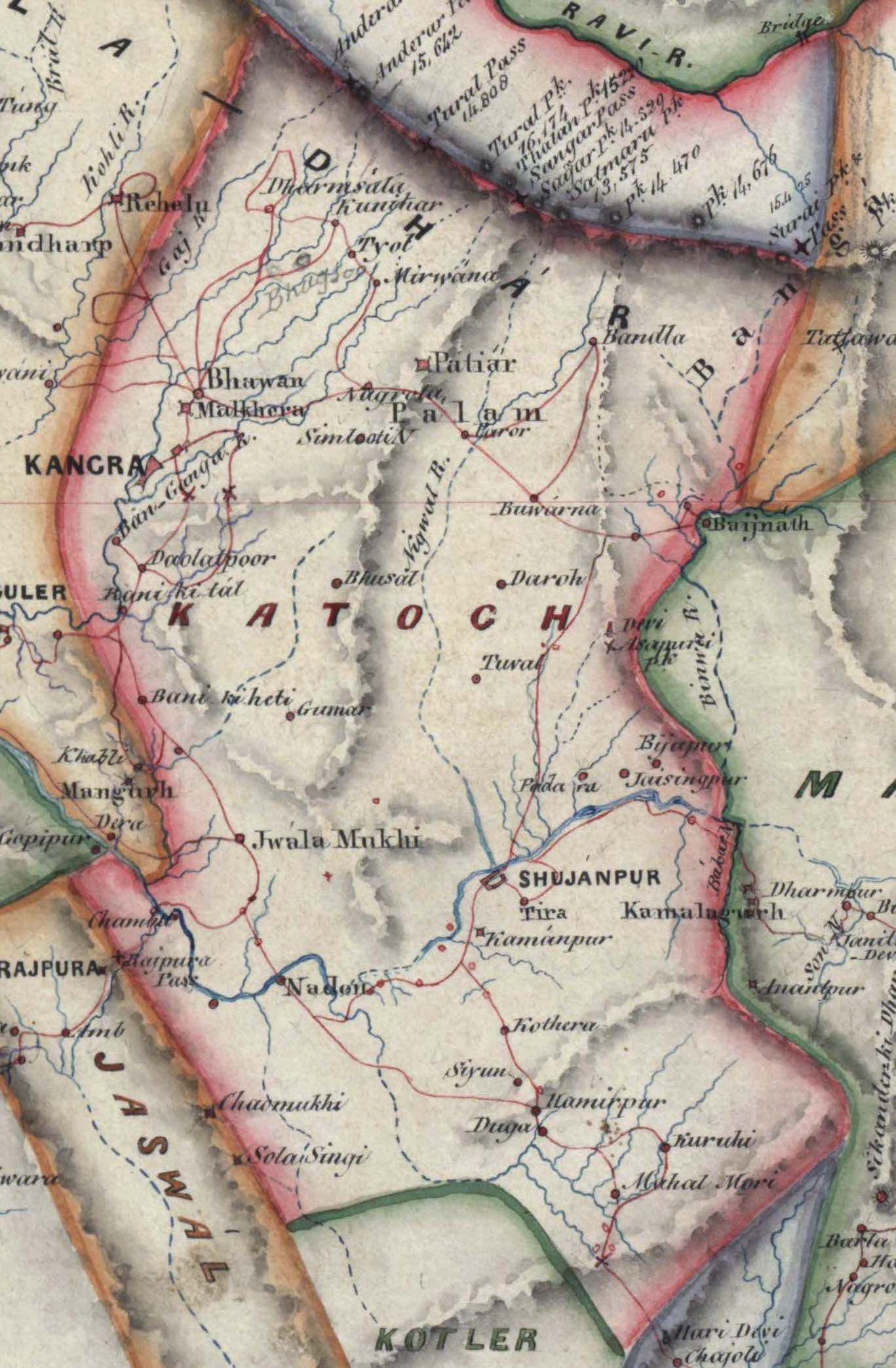
- Detail of the territory of Katoch (Kangra) from a map of the various Hill States of the Punjab Hills region, copied in 1852
- History
  - Established: 11th century
  - Annexation by the Sikh Empire: 1810
Succeeded by
Sikh Empire
- Today part of: Himachal Pradesh, India

Kangra-Lambagraon was a historical state and later princely estate (jagir) of British India located in the present-day state of Himachal Pradesh.

The rulers of the estate belonged to the ancient Katoch dynasty which had ruled the former Kangra State. Kangra is credited with being the oldest and largest state in the Punjab Hills.

In 1846 Kangra was annexed to British India as part of the Treaty of Lahore.

== History ==
=== Medieval invasions ===
At least three rulers sought to conquer the Kangra fort and plundered the treasures of its temples: Mahmud Ghazni in 1009, Firuz Shah Tughluq in 1360 and Sher Shah in 1540. Prithvi Chand II in 1333 defeated the army of Muhammad bin Tughluq which was not able to fight in the hills. In 1428, it was site of a fierce battle between Raja Jasrat, who had conquered most of Punjab from Delhi Sultans, and Delhi general Sikander Tohfa. Jasrat was defeated and forced to retreat.

=== Conflicts with the Mughals ===
The fort of Kangra resisted Mughal Emperor Akbar's siege. Akbar's son Jahangir successfully subdued the fort in 1620 annexing the surrounding area and reducing the Katoch rajas to the status of vassals. Kangra was at the time ruled by Raja Hari Chand Katoch of Kangra (also known as Raja Hari Chand II).

Jahangir with the help of Suraj Mal of Nurpur , the Maharaja of neighbouring Nurpur kingdom, garrisoned with his troops. Under Jahangir, Murtaza Khan the governor of Punjab was directed to conquer Kangra, but he failed on account of the jealousy and opposition of the Rajput chiefs who were associated with him. Then Prince Khurram was put in charge of the command. The siege of Kangra was pushed on for weeks. Supplies were cut off and the garrison had to live on boiled dry grass. It was faced with death and starvation. After a siege of 14 months, the fort surrendered in November, 1620. In 1621, Jahangir visited it and ordered the slaughter of a bullock there. A mosque was also built within the fort of Kangra.

The Katoch Kings repeatedly looted Mughal controlled regions, weakening the Mughal control, aiding in the decline of Mughal power, Raja Sansar Chand II succeeded in recovering the ancient fort of his ancestors, in 1789.

=== State extinguished and annexed by Sikh Empire ===
As the Mughal power waned, many former officers of the Mughal Empire took autonomous charge of the areas under their power and this situation affected Kangra. Meanwhile, (in 1758), Ghamand Chand, a supposed scion of the dispossessed family, attained a position of power in the Punjab plains, being appointed governor of Jalandhar by Ahmed Shah Abdali.

Building upon this ascendency, Ghamand Chand's grandson Sansar Chand rallied an army, ousted the then ruler of Kangra, Saif Ali Khan, and gained possession of his patrimony. This happened in 1783, and Sansar Chand was aided by the Kanhaiya misl, one of several Sikh principalities that ruled the Punjab region in that era. During the campaign, Raja Sansar Chand and his mercenary force overran other nearby principalities and compelled the submission of their rulers. He reigned over a relatively large part of present-day Himachal Pradesh for perhaps two decades, but his ambitions brought him into conflict with the Gorkha dynasty ruling the then nascent state of Nepal.

The Gorkhas and the recently humbled hill-states allied to invade Kangra in 1806. The Raja was defeated and left with no territory beyond the immediate vicinity of the fortress of Kangra, which he managed to retain with the help of a small force sent from the Sikh Empire by Maharaja Ranjit Singh. In this despair, the Sansar Chand treated with Ranjit Singh at Jawalamukhi in 1809. By that treaty, Raja Sansar Chand surrendered his (now largely notional) state to Maharaja Ranjit Singh, in return for a substantial fief to be held under the suzerainty of the latter. This estate consisted, in 1947, of 20 villages yielding a revenue of Rs. 40,000/- and encompassing an area of 324 km^{2}. Maharaja Ranjit Singh duly established his rule over the land; Raja Sansar Chand received in addition the estate of Lambagraon.

=== British era ===
As a result of the First Anglo-Sikh War (1846), the area between the Sutlej and Ravi rivers, including the hill states, were ceded by the Sikhs to the British East India Company. Thus, Lambagraon estate was annexed by the British and was one of the feudatory estates placed under the Simla Hill States' Superintendency. In deference with the ruling dynasty's association with Kangra town (and given the fact that the estate fell within Kangra district) the estate was referred to as "Kangra-Lambagraon".

The princely estate of Kangra-Lambagraon acceded unto the Dominion of India in 1947; the following year, it was merged with its sister states of the erstwhile Simla superintendency to create a province named Himachal Pradesh, administered by a Chief Commissioner.

== See also ==
- History of Himachal Pradesh
- Kangra district
- Kangra painting
- Trigarta
