= Guler =

Guler may refer to:

- Guler State, a former princely state in India
  - Guler paintings
- Haripur Guler, a town in India, former capital of Guler State
- Guler, a former parliamentary constituency in Himachal Pradesh, now Jawali, Himachal Pradesh
- Guler von Wyneck family, a noble family from Davos, Switzerland
- Güler (disambiguation), a Turkish name
