= Seu (artist) =

Pahari artist (c. 1680–1740)

Pandit Seu
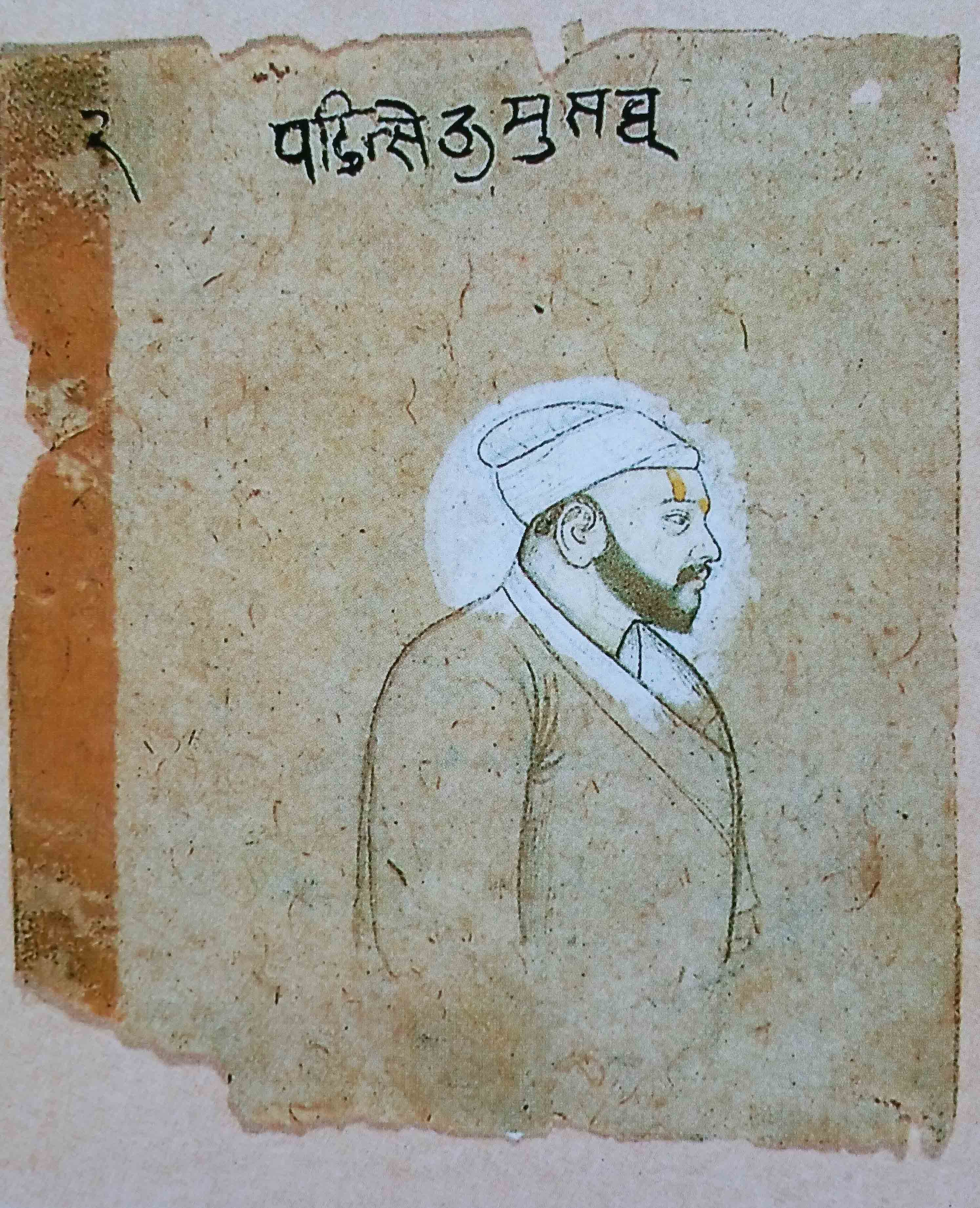
- Portrait of Seu, by his son Nainsukh, c. 1735–40.
- Style: Pahari (specifically Guler)
- Patron: Raja Dalip Singh of Guler State

Signature
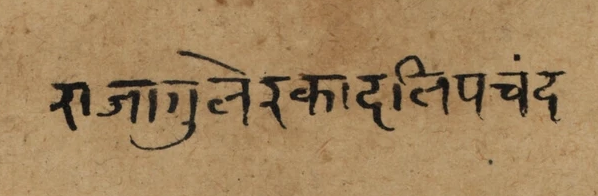

Seu (c. 1680–1740), also known as Pandit Seu, was a Pahari artist who specialized in musawir. He was attached to the court of Raja Dilip Singh of Guler State (reigned ca.1695–1741). He was a member of the Seu-Manaku-Nainsukh family.

== Biography ==
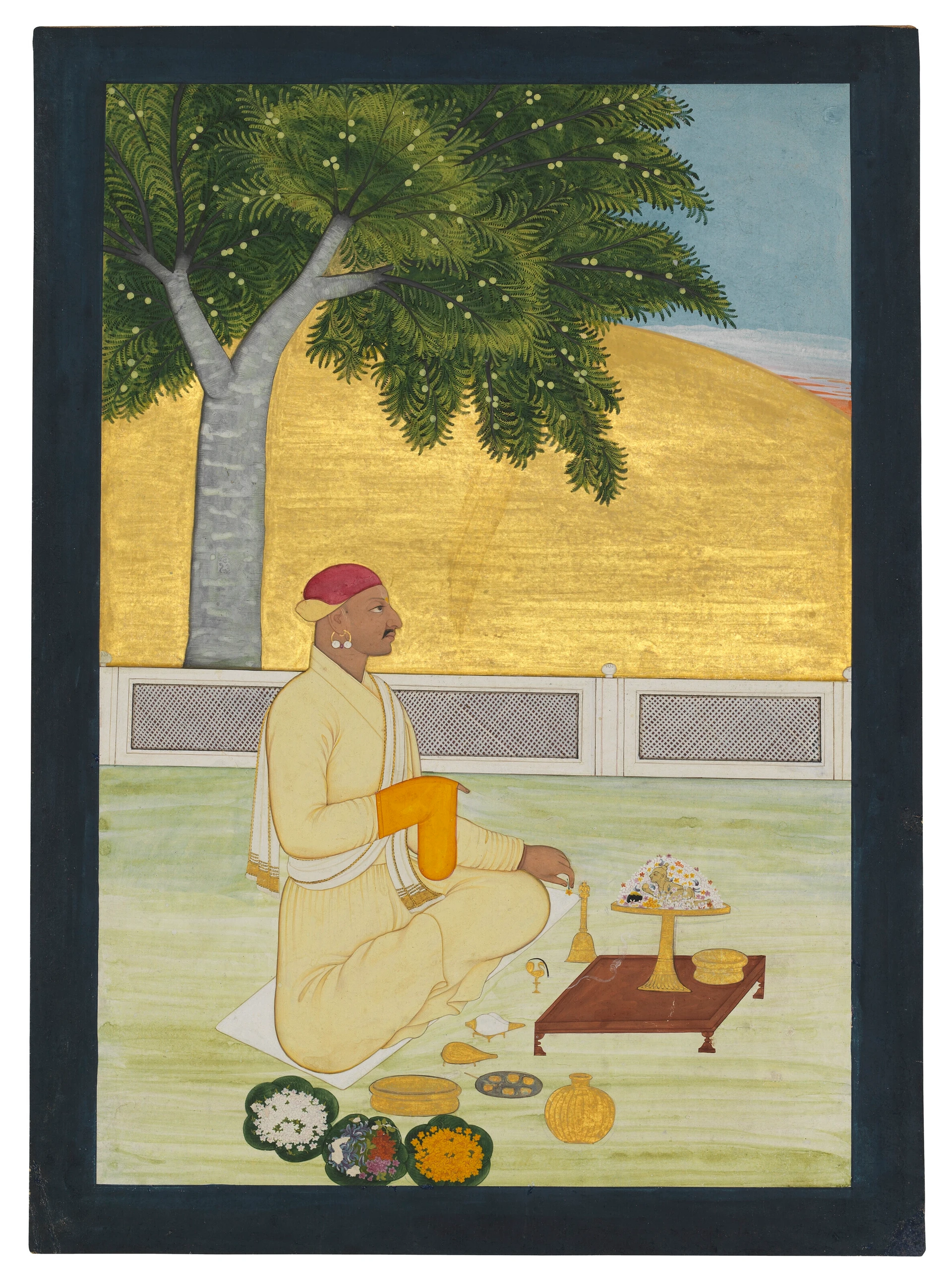
Painting of Raja Dalip Singh of Guler State performing puja, attributed to Seu, ca.1740. Seu was patronized by Raja Dalip Singh of Guler.

Seu was the son of Hasnu, grandson of Bharathu, and great-grandson of Data. Seu was a native of Guler. Seu must have left the hills and travelled to the plains, where he came into contact with Mughal artists of the late-Mughal style. Seu was alive when Aurangzeb was disassembling the Mughal ateliers, which led to these artists to leave Delhi for other states, such as Guler. Seu would establish an atelier (workshop) in Guler, which for 150 years produced talented artists.

=== Familial atelier ===
He was the patriarch of the Seu-Manaku-Nainsukh family, which would produced famous artists such as Manaku, Nainsukh, Fattu, Khushala, Kama, Ranjha, Gursahai, Sukhdayal, Deviditta, Gaudhu, Nikka, Saudagar, Attra, and Ramdayal. His two sons, Manaku and Nainsukh, became successful artists in their own right. Seu served as the mentor to his elder son, Manaku, with both his sons being educated at his workshop. His son, Manaku, would later finish a Ramayana series that Seu had left unfinished.

== Style ==
Seu belonged to the phase of Pahari painting that began in 1730 onwards that was characterized by a move toward a naturalistic style and innovations, perhaps due to Mughal influence. This Mughal influence may be attributed to the weakening of Mughal state power in the early 18th century, which led the artists previously working under the Mughals to seek patronage elsewhere, such as in the Hill States. When compared to the works of his son Nainsukh, Seu more hesitantly incorporated elements from the late-Mughal-style. Seu's work is characterized by distinct outlines and an affinity for strong background colors, which is characteristic of earlier styles.

== Gallery ==
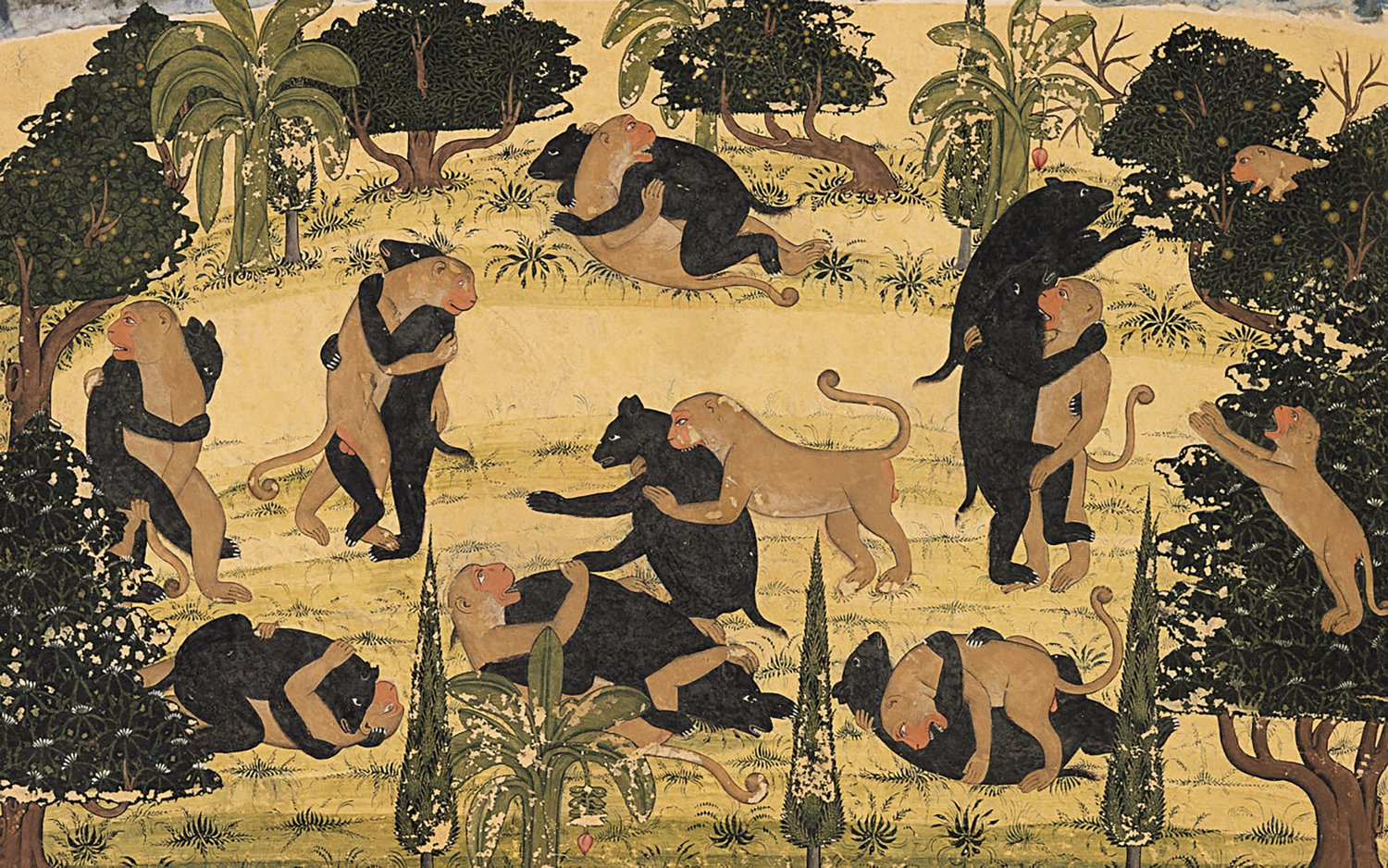
'Fight of Drunken Monkeys and Bears', by Seu, ca.1720

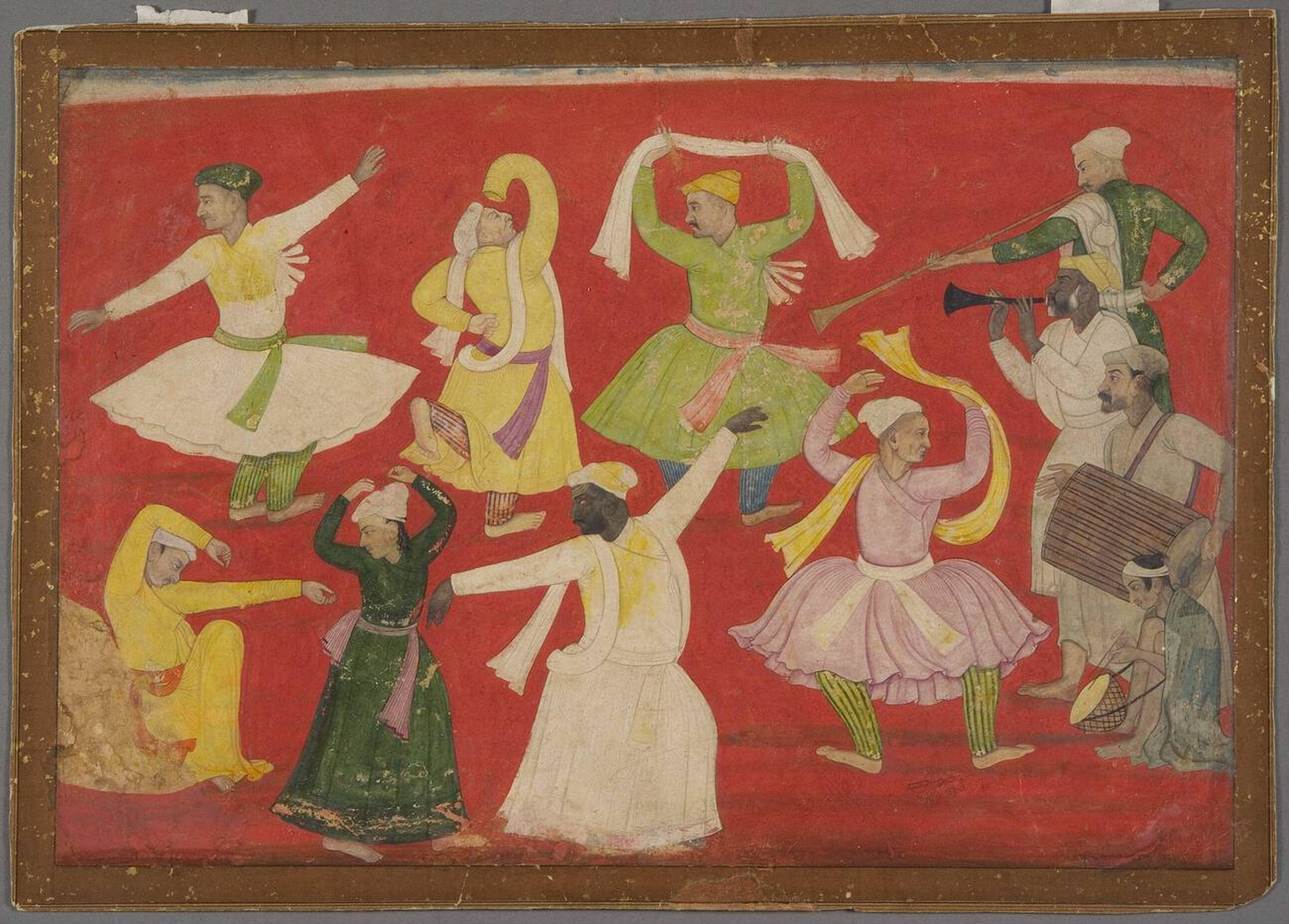
'Dancing Villagers', attributed to Seu of Guler, ca.1730

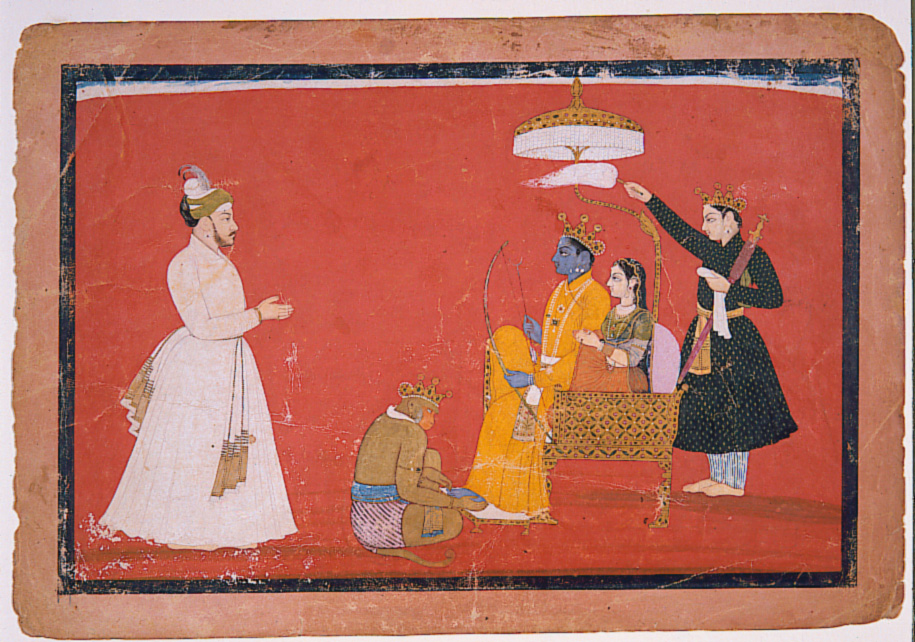
Rama and Sita Enthroned, ca.1730

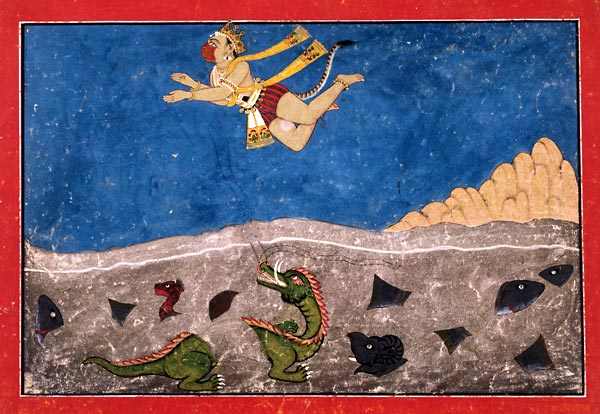
Hanuman crosses the ocean and kills Sursa, ca.1720

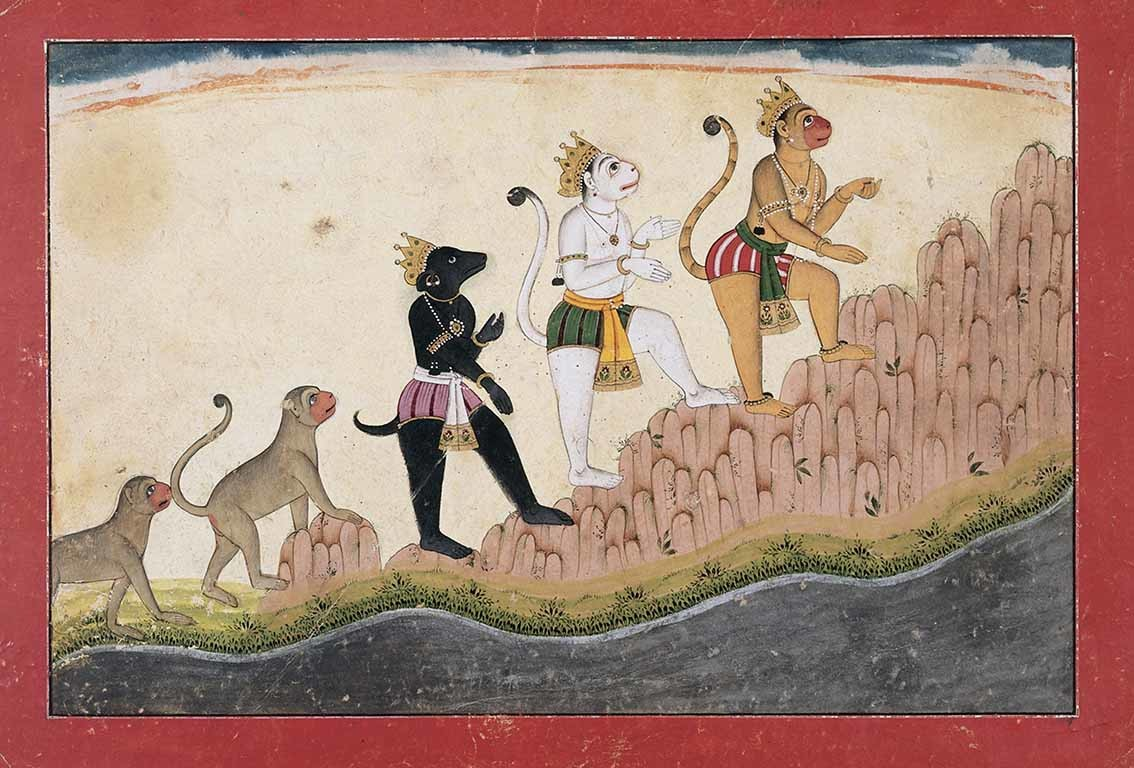
Hanuman, Angada, and Jambavan climb Mount Mahendra, ca.1720

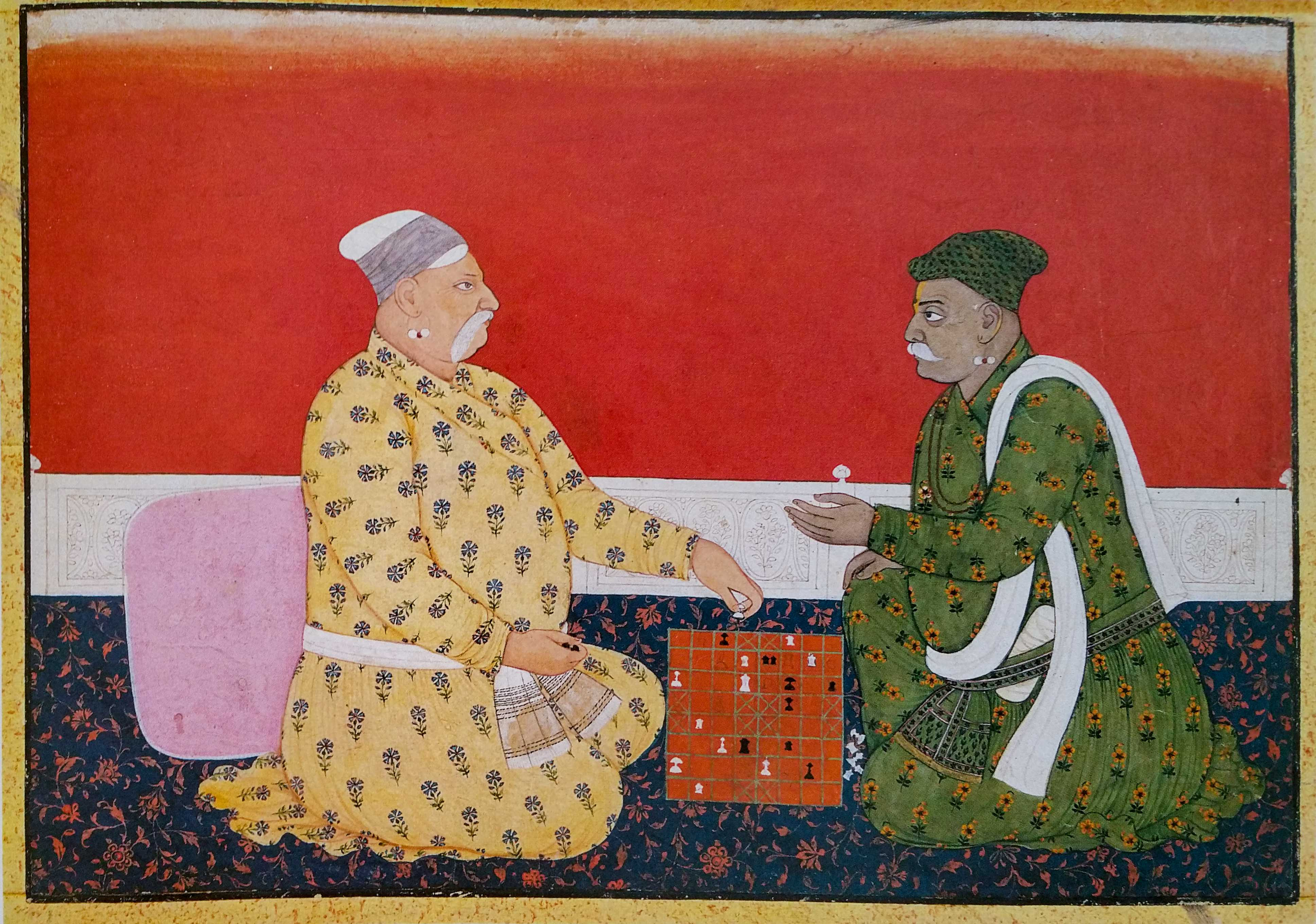
Painting of Mian Gopal Singh playing chess with Pandit Dinamani Raina. Ascribed to Pandit Seu of Guler. Dated ca.1720–1725
