= Battle of Guler (1696) =

Battle fought between Sikh Guru Gobind Singh and Mughal Forces

- Part of Mughal-Sikh Wars
Date	20 February 1696
Location	Guler
Result	Sikh victory

Belligerents
Akal Sena (Sikhs)	Mughal Empire Hill States

Commanders and leaders
Guru Gobind Rai; Bhai Himmat Rai; Bhai Alam Chand; Sahibzada Ajit Singh; Bhai Daya Ram Sobhi	Hussain Khan †; Rajas of the Sivalik Hills

Strength
Unknown	2,000

Casualties and losses
Unknown	Almost all

The Battle of Guler was fought between Mughal forces led by Hussain Khan, and the Raja of Guler, aided by the Akal Sena.

== Background ==
In an expedition against Guru Gobind Singh, Rustom Khan failed, and he returned humiliated. Therefore, General Hussain Khan marched to besiege Anandpur, and on his way, Mudhkar Shah (ruler of Dadwal), along with his sons, were defeated by Khan. Moreover, others like Kripal Chand Katoch of Kangra and Bhim Chand of Bilaspur State submitted before the Mughal Army without a fight. Hussain Khan demanded certain tribute from the rajas, but the Raja of Guler State, Raja Gopal, brought less money than demanded by Khan. In anger, Raja Gopal's fort was besieged.

== Battle ==
Guru Gobind Singh sent his men to help the raja of Guler. A fierce battle was fought between Sikhs and Hussain's army southeast of Pathankot at Guler, in which Hussain Khan and his coalition rajas, Kirpal Chand Katoch and Himmat Singh, were killed by Guru's forces. Guru Gobind Singh describes the battle in detail in the Bachittar Natak.
