= Krishna and Radha in a Pavilion =

Anonymous Indian 18th-century painting

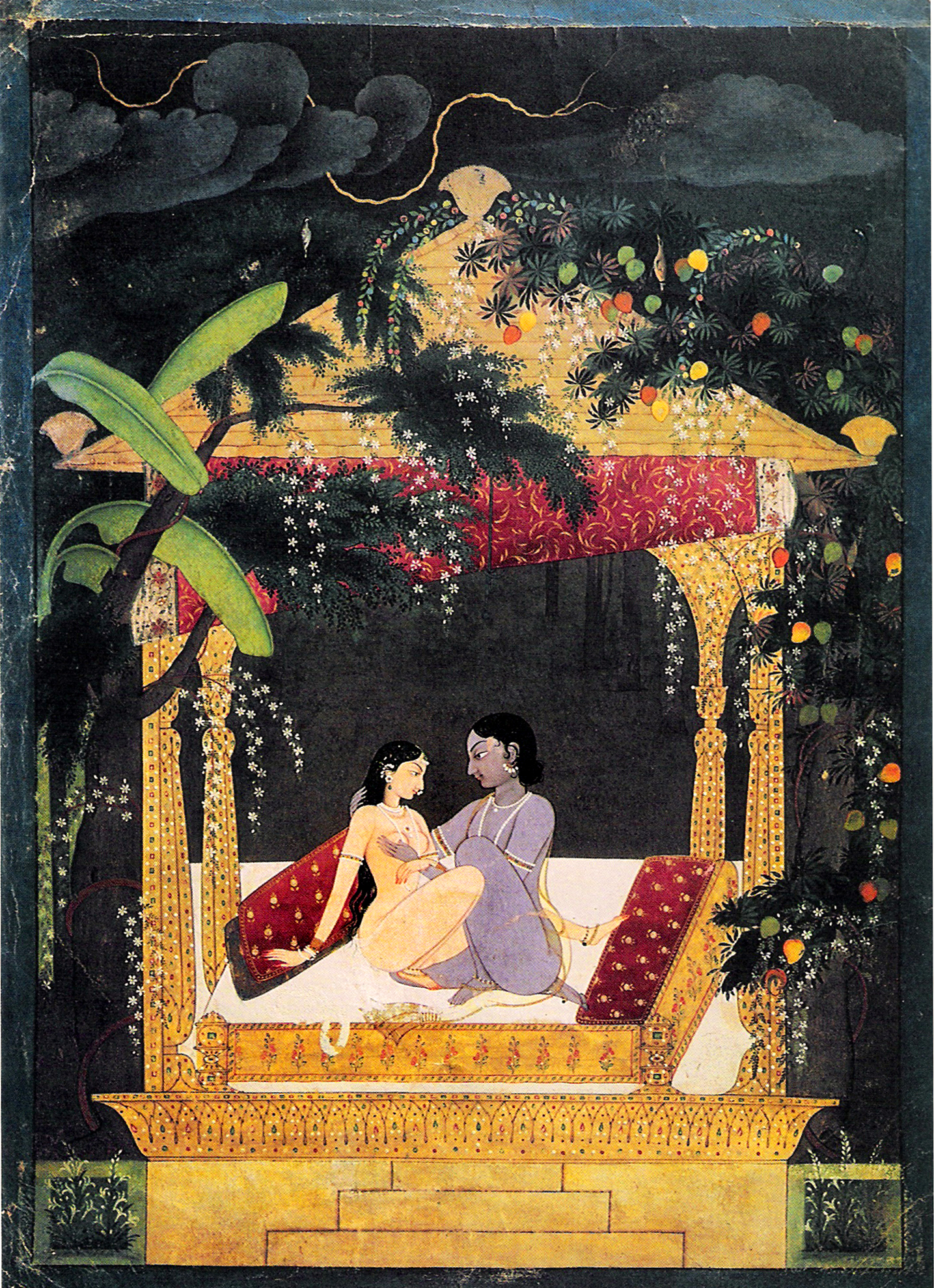
- Artist: Unknown artist
- Year: circa 1760
- Type: Opaque watercolor on paper
- Dimensions: 28 cm × 20 cm (11 in × 7.9 in)
- Location: National Museum, New Delhi

Krishna and Radha in a Pavilion, alternatively titled The Pavilion of Love, is an 18th-century miniature painting of the Pahari school. It depicts the two Hindu deities Krishna and Radha engaged in sexual intimacy. It is located in the National Museum of India.

== Background ==
The Hindu god Krishna is worshipped as a human avatar of Vishnu. Radha, his chief consort, is worshipped as the goddess of love. The 12th-century poem Gita Govinda, that describes the relationship of this couple, served as the inspiration for several paintings depicting Krishna and Radha, including this one. The painting is dated to the last quarter of the 18th century. It was likely painted in the court of Raja Govardhan Chand (r. 1741-1773) of the Guler chieftaincy.

== Description ==
Upon a bed, Krishna and Radha are seated together, in a light embrace. They are completely in the nude, except for their jewelry, which consists of gold wristlets, pearl necklaces, and earrings composed of gold and pearls. They raise their knees, which prevents the viewer from seeing any more of their nakedness. A veil clings to Krishna's back, which was perhaps taken off from Radha's body. Krishna looks at Radha, while she averts her gaze. His right hand caresses her hair, while his left hand touches her breast. Radha extends her right hand to the pillow behind her, as if steadying herself.

The sides of the golden bed are adorned with floral designs. It is within a golden pavilion, the pillars of which are studded with jewels. The pavilion, open on all sides, has a small flight of steps leading up to it. The sloping roof of the pavilion is covered by the branches and foliage of surrounding trees. These include a mango tree on the right, laden with mangoes of various colors, and a plantain tree on the left. Above the pavilion is a Jacobin cuckoo, associated with the monsoon season in Indian poetry, as well as a peacock. Both birds raise their necks upwards, towards the dark sky, which forms the background. A bolt of lightning lights up this dark sky. This, again, is indicative of the monsoon season. Lightning is also used in Rajput and Pahari paintings to represent sexual excitement.

== Reception ==
The painting is the example of Pahari painting used in Gardner's Art Through the Ages. Art scholar Stuart Cary Welch calls it a prime example of "Mughal naturalism combined with the tender lyricism of local traditions and Vaishnavite poetry".
