= Raja Gopal (Guler) =

Raja of Guler from 1675 to 1695

Raj Singh
- Raja
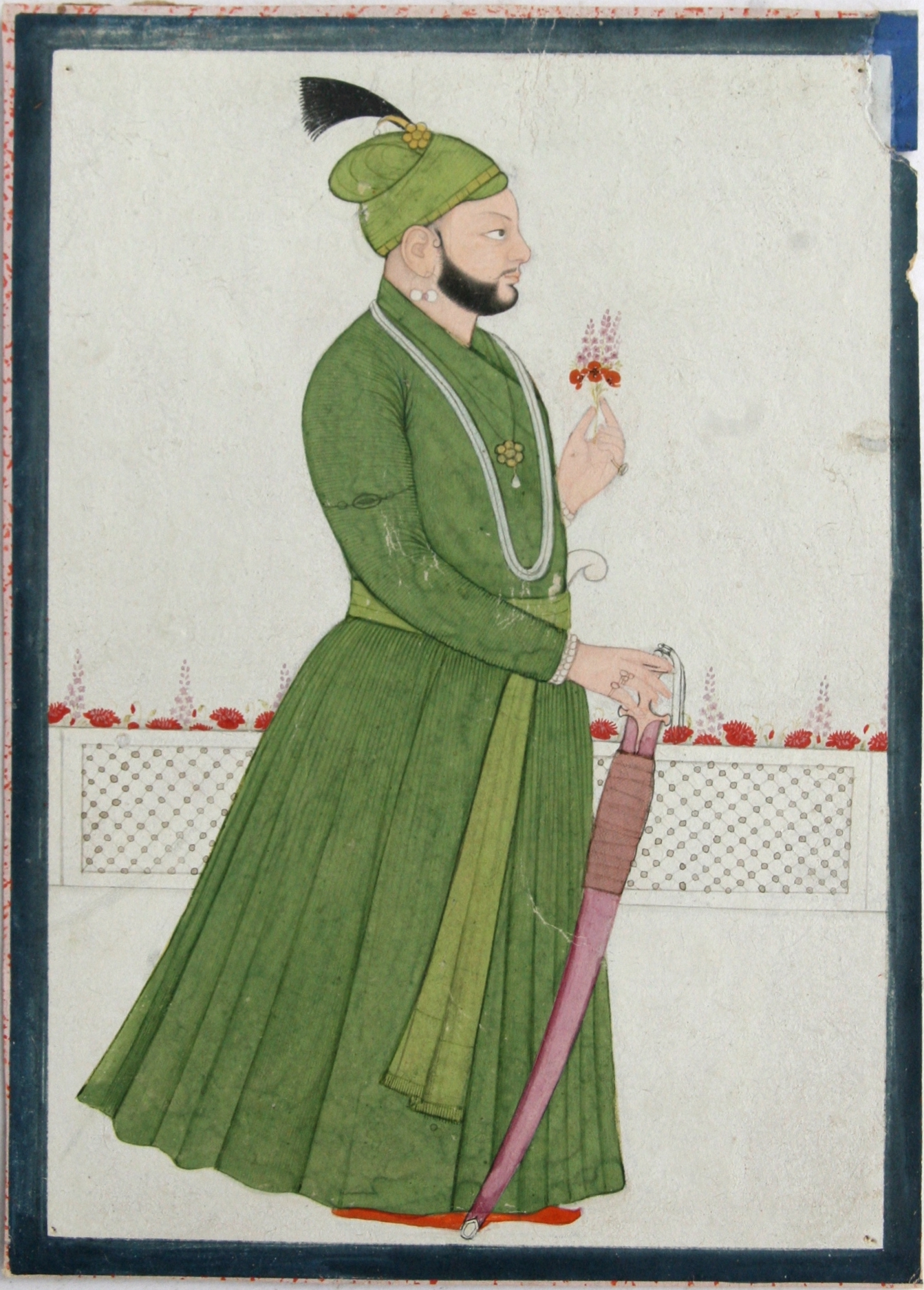
- Miniature painting of Raj Singh of Guler, also known as Raja Gopal, standing on a terrace whilst holding a flower

Raja of Guler
- Reign: ca.1685 – ca.1695
Names
- Gaj Singh Gopal
- Religion: Hinduism

Raja Gopal or Raj Singh (fl. late 17th century) was the king of Guler and was one of the hill chieftains who fought against Guru Gobind Singh in Battle of Bhangani in 1688. He has also been mentioned in Bachittar Natak by Guru Gobind Singh.

== Biography ==
In 1688, a coalition of Hill Rajas, including Raja Gopal, against the Sikhs was defeated in-battle at Bhangani by Guru Gobind Singh.

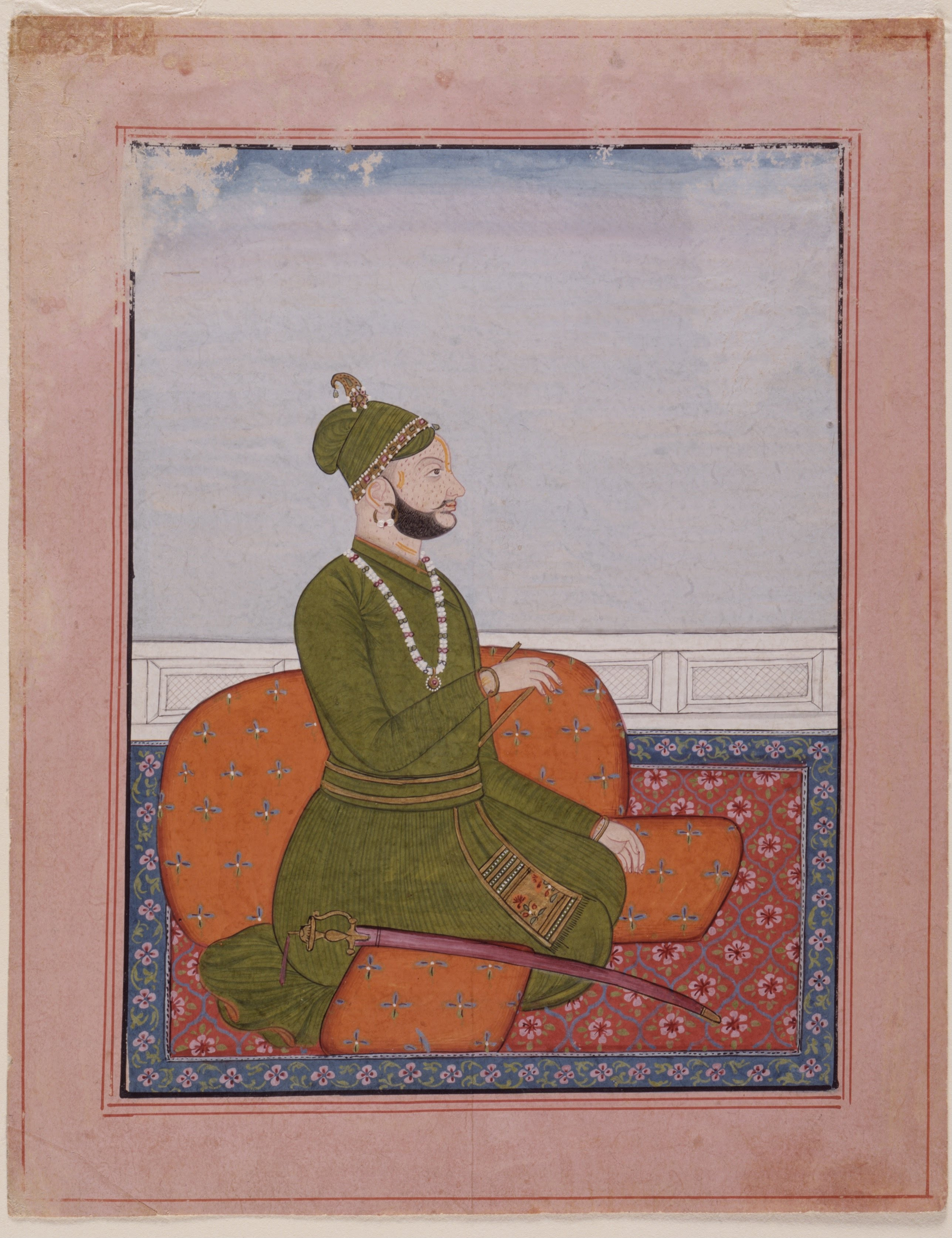
Miniature painting of Raj Singh of Guler, also known as Raja Gopal, seated on a terrace whilst leaning against a bolster, ca.1690–1710

After the defeat of the hill chieftains in Bhangani, Raja Gopal wanted to sought peace and friendship from Guru Gobind Singh. Husain Khan, was dispatched by Dilawar Khan, a Mughal chief, to collect tribute from Raja Gopal. Raja Gopal could not pay the heavy tribute which was levied upon him. This resulted in a fight. Raja Gopal was assisted by Raja Ram Singh of Jasvan and Sangat Rai with seven Sikhs who had come to the embassy for peace. In the Battle of Guler which ensued on 20 February 1696, Husain Khan was slain and Raja Gopal and his allies won a decisive victory. Later, Raja Gopal showed his gratitude to Guru Gobind Singh by making offerings to him.
