= Manaku of Guler =

Indian painter (c. 1700–1760)

Manaku
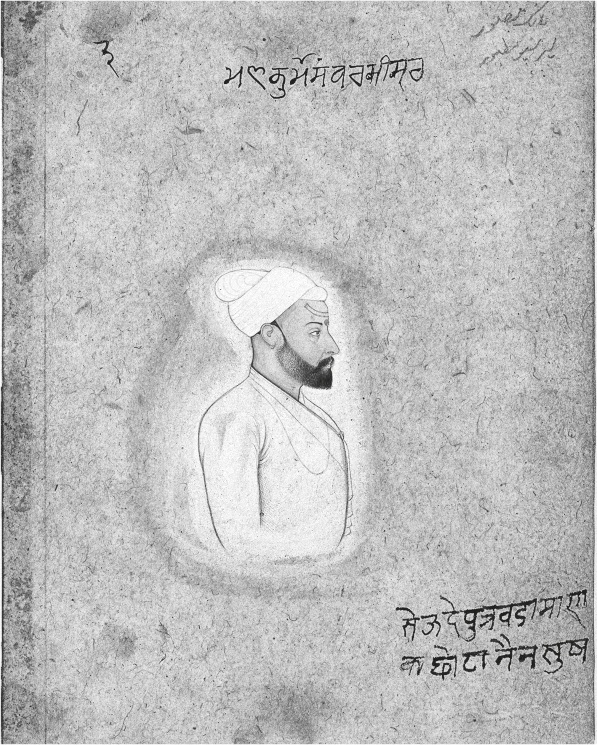
- Portrait of Manaku by his brother Nainsukh
- Born: Manaku; 1700; Guler
- Died: 1760 (aged 59–60)
- Known for: Painting
- Movement: Pahari painting
- Family: Nainsukh (brother)

Manaku of Guler or Manaku (c. 1700–1760) was an Indian painter from the Guler State, in modern-day Himachal Pradesh. After his death he was mostly forgotten and overshadowed by his much-celebrated younger brother Nainsukh. But today he is recognised as an exponent of Pahari style of painting, much like his brother. The rediscovery of Manaku has been a result of research efforts by art historians like B. N. Goswamy. Like Nainsukh, Manaku almost never signed his works, and only four extant works carry his signature. He was a member of the Seu-Manaku-Nainsukh family.

== Gallery ==
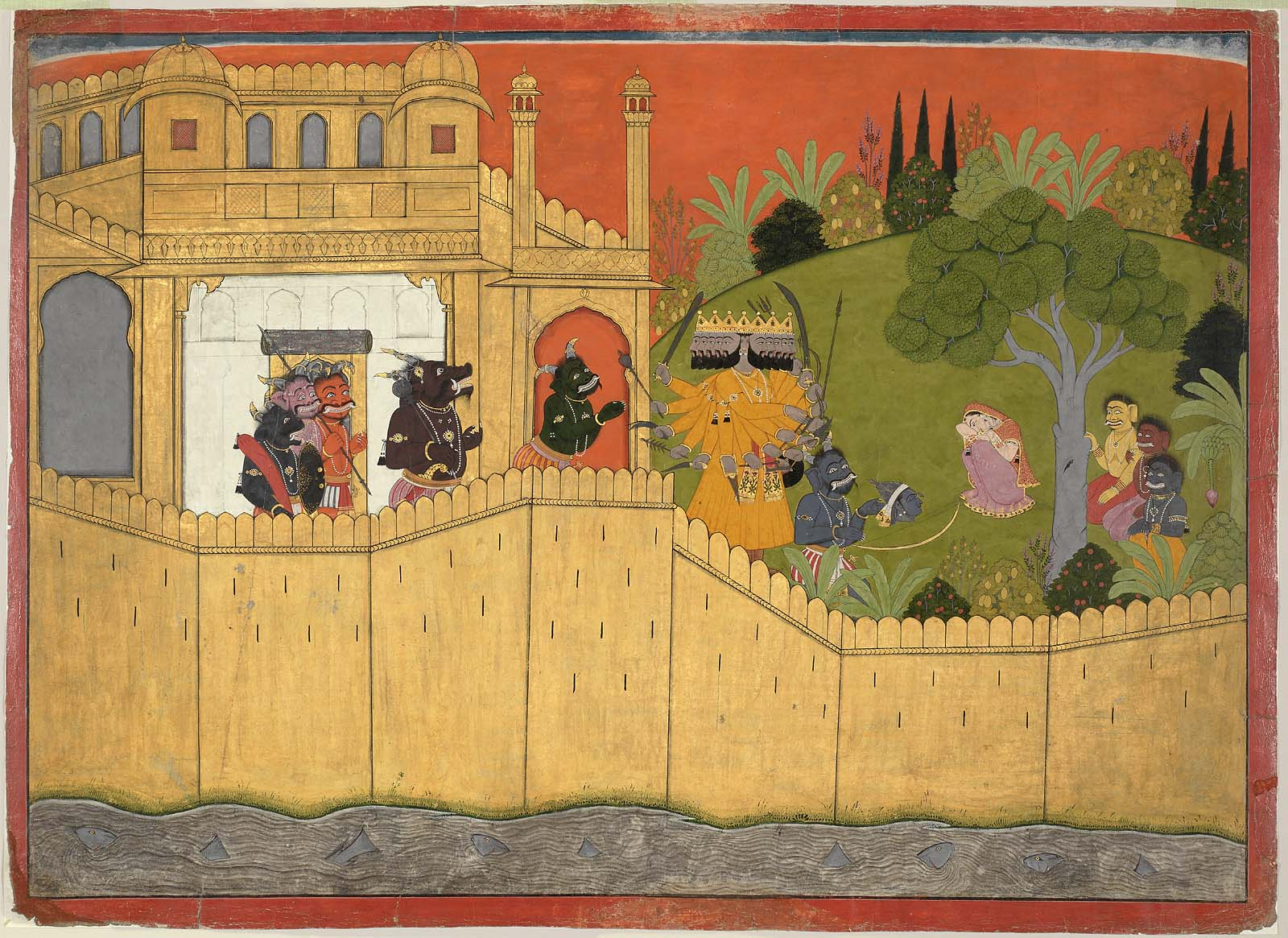
Ravana shows Sita the counterfeit head of Rama, c. 1725, Opaque watercolor and gold on paper, Museum of Fine Arts, Boston

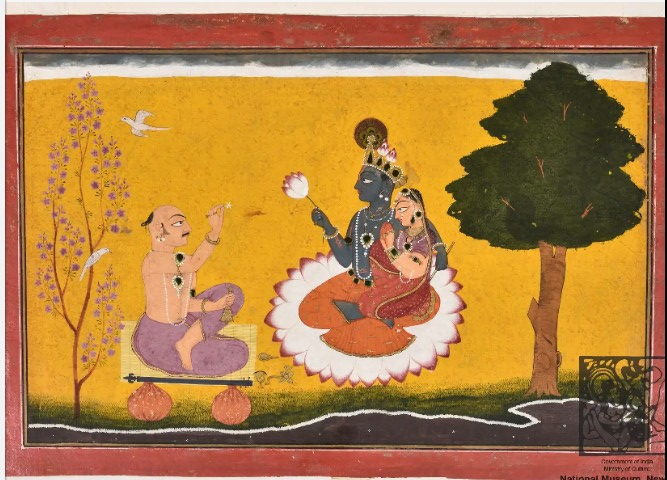
Poet Jayadeva worshipping Radha and Krishna based on Jayadeva's Gita Govinda, c. 1730, Watercolour on paper, National Museum, New Delhi

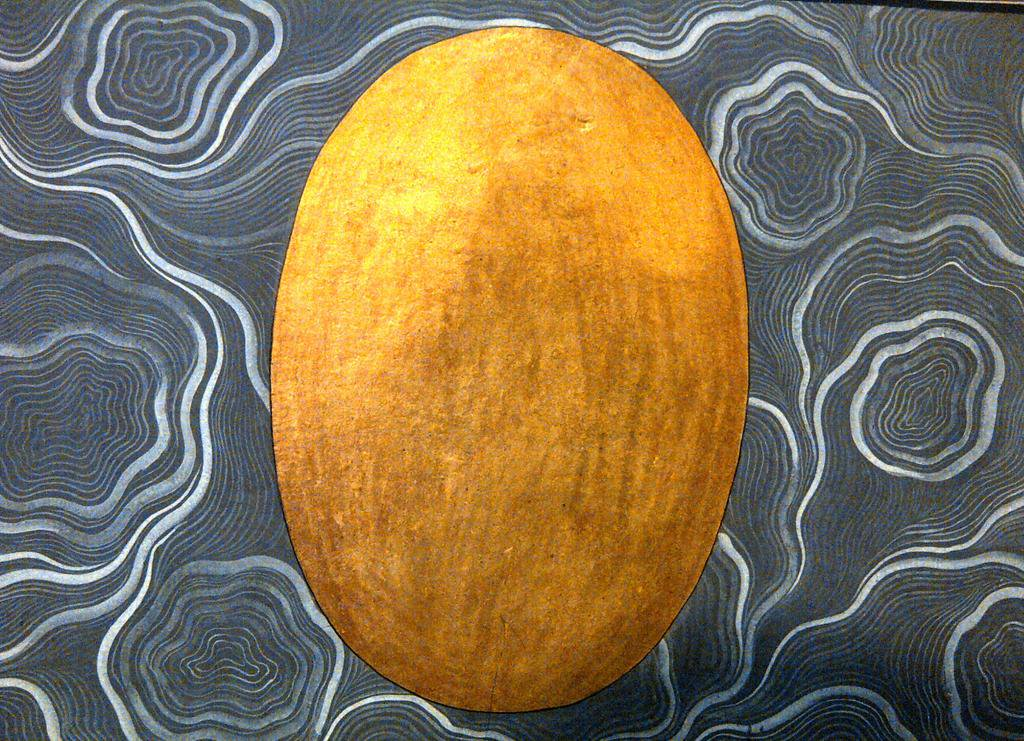
Hiranyagarbha (Golden Cosmic Egg), c. 1740, Opaque watercolour and gold on paper, Bharat Kala Bhavan, Varanasi

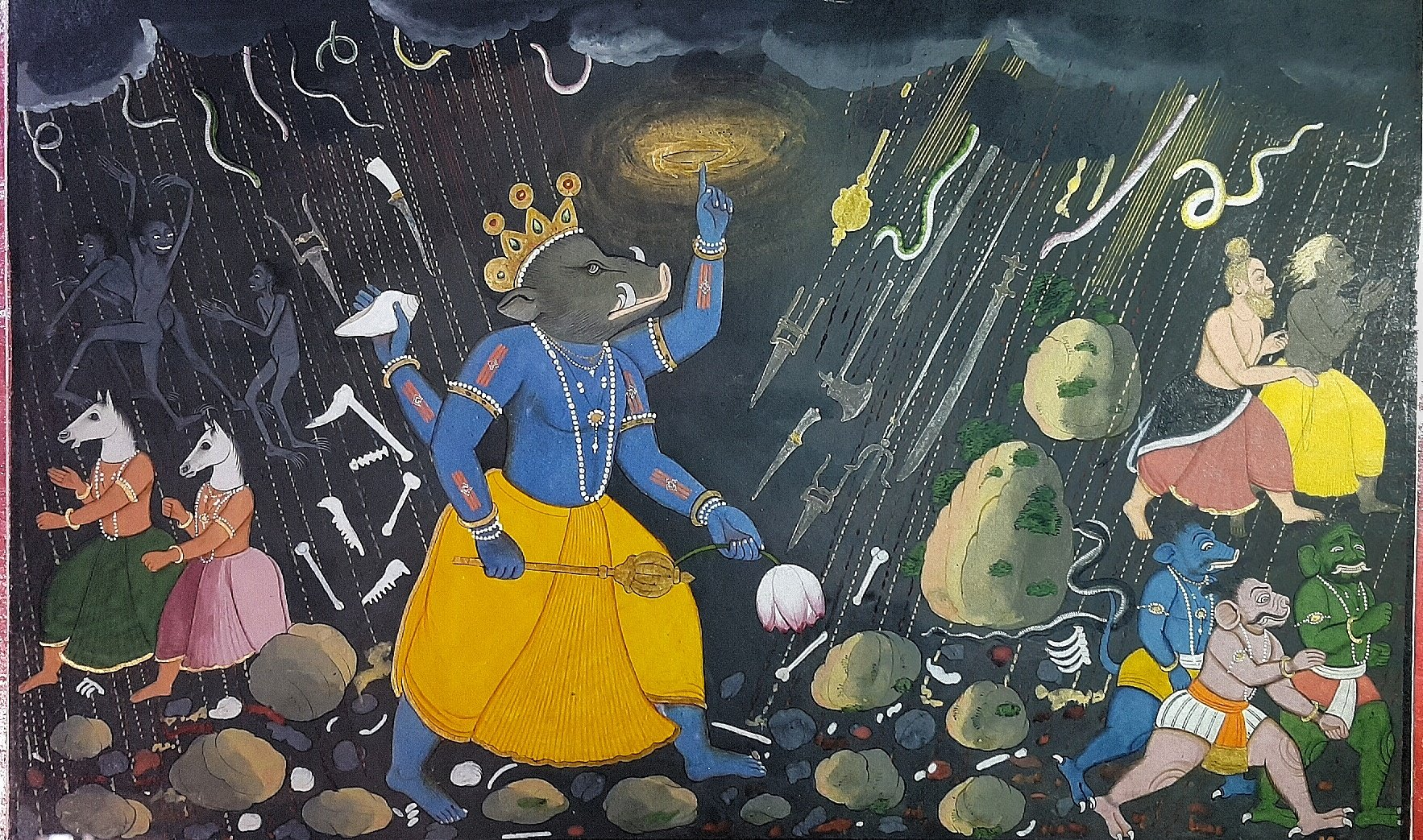
Vishnu as Varaha challenges the demon Hiranyaksha from Bhagavata Purana series, c. 1740, Opaque watercolour and gold on paper, Government Museum and Art Gallery, Chandigarh

== Bibliography ==
- Goswamy, B. N.; Fischer, Eberhard (1997). Pahari Masters: Court Painters of Northern India. Oxford University Press. ISBN 9780195640144.
- Goswamy, B. N. (2014). The Spirit of Indian Painting: Close Encounters with 100 Great Works 1100–1900. Penguin UK. ISBN 9789351188629.
- Goswamy, B. N. (2017). Manaku of Guler: The Life and Work of Another Great Indian Painter from a Small Hill State. New Delhi: Niyogi Books. ISBN 978-9385285820.
