= Seu-Manaku-Nainsukh family =

Family of artists

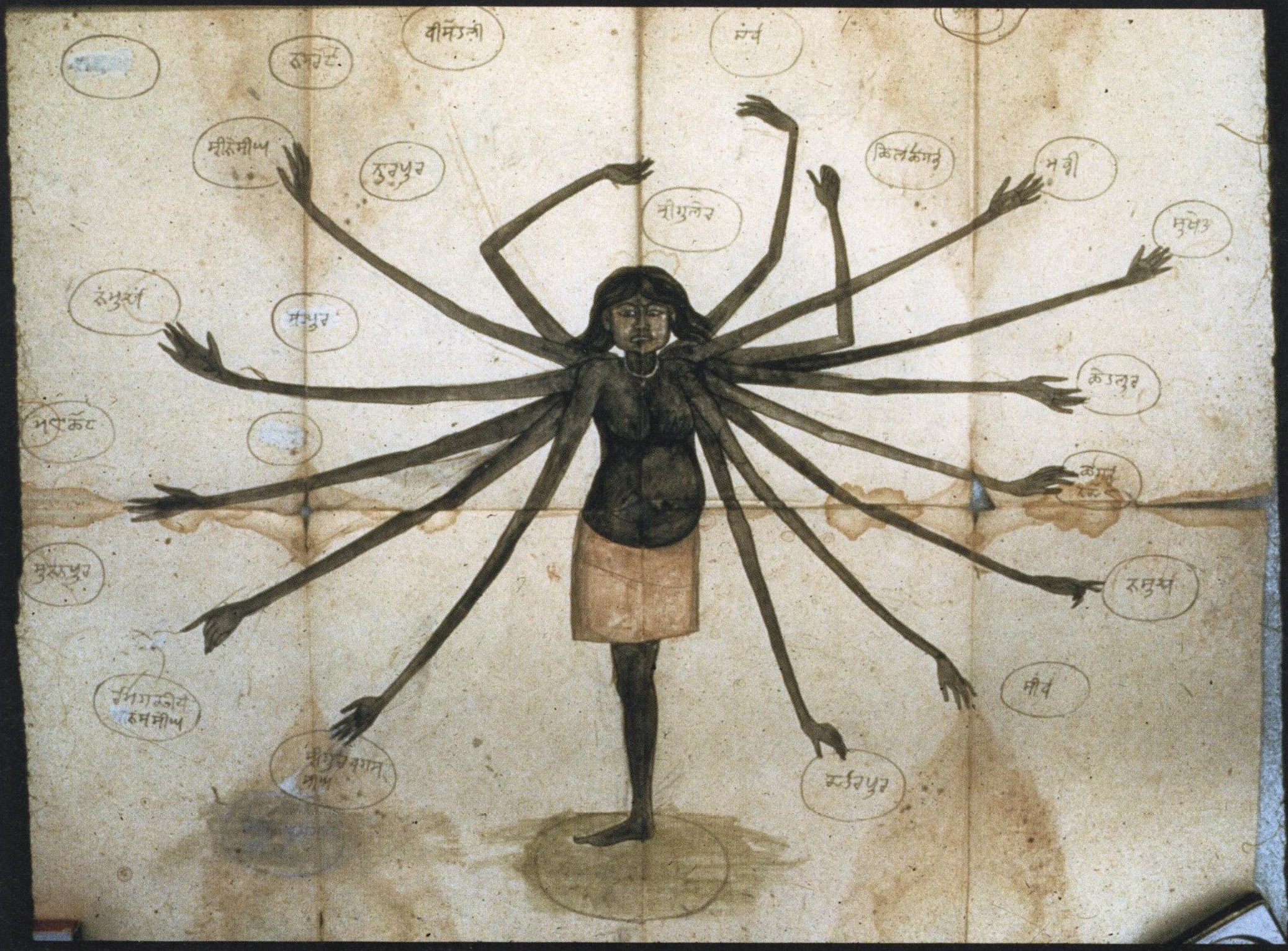
Devi diagram of Pandit Seu's family, Pahari, from the familial atelier of Nainsukh of Guler, ca.1780

The Seu-Manaku-Nainsukh family, also known as the Seu-Nainsukh family, were a family of artists active during the 18th and 19th centuries in the Punjab Hills region of the Indian subcontinent.

Seu was the patriarch of the Seu-Manaku-Nainsukh family, which would produced famous artists such as Manaku, Nainsukh, Fattu, Khushala, Kama, Ranjha, Gursahai, Sukhdayal, Deviditta, Gaudhu, Nikka, Saudagar, Attra, and Ramdayal. His two sons, Manaku and Nainsukh, became successful artists in their own right. Seu served as the mentor to his elder son, Manaku, with both his sons being educated at his workshop. His son, Manaku, would later finish a Ramayana series that Seu had left unfinished.

The periods of the Seu familial atelier can be divided as follows:

1. Seu – during the 1720s
2. Manaku and Nainsukh – active between 1730 and 1760
3. First generation after Manaku and Nainsukh, consisting of their six sons – 1760's onwards
4. Second generation after Manaku and Nainsukh, consisting of their grandchildren

The family claimed to be originally Kashmiri Brahmins. However, today they are considered Dhimans but carry the surname Raina. In the 1960s, Indian art historian B. N. Goswamy was able to connect the signatures of artists on 18th century paintings to the names recorded in the Haridwar genealogy records to uncover the history of the Seu-Nainsukh-Manaku familial atelier.
