= Güler =

Güler is a Turkish name and may refer to:

== Given name ==
- Güler İleri (born 1948), Turkish pharmacist, politician and former government minister
- Güler Sabancı (born 1955), Turkish businesswoman

== Surname ==
- Abdullah Güler, Turkish politician
- Ara Güler (1928–2018), Turkish photographer and photojournalist of Armenian descent
- Arda Güler (born 2005), Turkish footballer
- Aydemir Güler (born 1961), Turkish communist politician
- Eslem Güler (born 2006), Turkish female basketball player
- Esra Güler (born 1994), Turkish women's footballer
- Hilmi Güler (born 1946), Turkish politician and metallurgical engineer
- Muammer Güler (born 1949), Turkish politician
- Muratcan Güler (born 1980), Turkish professional basketball player
- Onurcan Güler (born 1995), Turkish footballer
- Sibel Güler (born 1984), Bulgarian-born Turkish female taekwondo practitioner
- Sinan Güler (born 1983), Turkish professional basketball player
- Yasemin Güler (born 1994), Turkish female handball player
- Yaşar Güler (born 1954), Turkish general
