= Pahari painting =

Indian pictorial art form related to the Himalayan foothills of northwestern India

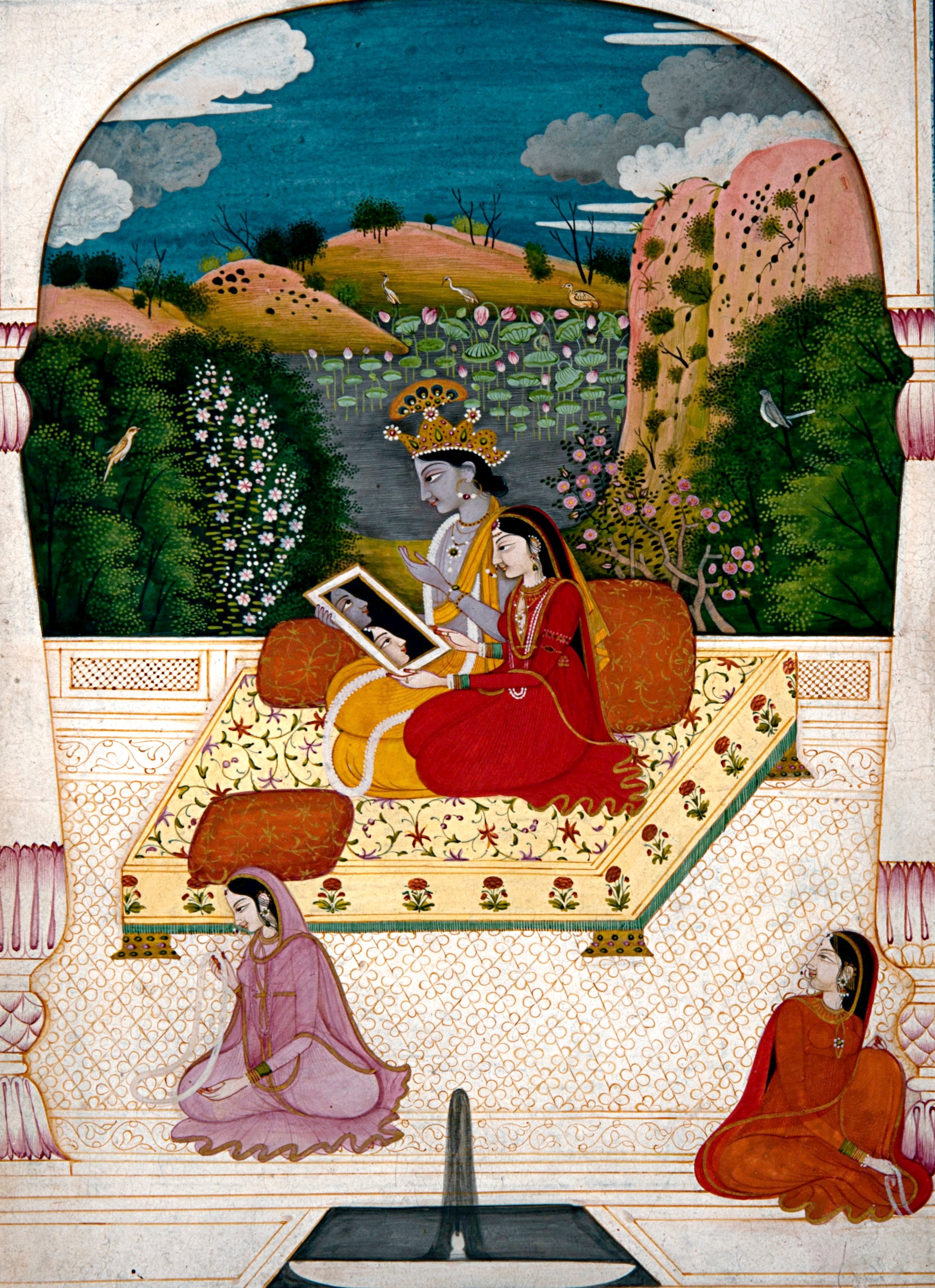
Radha-Krishna theme, from the Gita Govinda in Pahari style, Garhwal sub-school

Pahari painting (lit. 'a painting from the mountainous regions, pahar meaning a mountain in Hindi') is an umbrella term used for a form of Indian painting, done mostly in miniature forms, originating from the lower Himalayan hill kingdoms of North India, during the early 17th to mid 19th century, notably Basohli, Mankot, Nurpur, Chamba, Kangra, Guler, Mandi and Garhwal. The oldest and still active painter lineage in the region belongs to the Gujarati Manikanth family of Chamba, whose arrival traces back to 1589 during the reign of Raja Balbhadra Varman, as documented by V. C. Ohri in his 1991 study. Nainsukh was a famous master of the mid-18th century, followed by his family workshop for another two generations. The central theme of Pahari painting is depiction of eternal love of the Hindu deities Radha and Krishna. A distinct lyricism, spontaneous rhythm, softness, minute intricate details of composition, and intense perception and portrayal of human emotions and physical features distinguish the Pahari miniatures from the other miniature schools like Deccan, Mughal and Rajasthani-Rajput.

== Origin and area ==
The Pahari school, prevalent in the foothills and mountaine region of the Western Himalayan range, is one of the two main forms of Rajput art, the other being the Rajasthan school. Rajput art emerged out of the Jain school of Gujarat. The Pahari school developed and flourished during the 17th and 19th centuries, in the sub-Himalayan northern India, stretching from Jammu to Garhwal, through Himachal Pradesh. Each created stark variations within the genre, ranging from bold intense Basohli Painting, originating from Basohli in Jammu and Kashmir, to the delicate and lyrical Kangra paintings, which became synonymous to the style before other schools of paintings developed, and finally to the poetic and cinematic representations in Garhwali Paintings by Mola Ram. The Kangra style reached its pinnacle with paintings of Radha and Krishna, inspired by Jayadeva's Gita Govinda.

Pahari painting grew out of the Mughal painting, though this was patronized mostly by the Rajput kings who ruled many parts of the region, and gave birth to a new idiom in Indian painting. Portraiture of Pahari rulers arose in the first quarter of the 17th century, with the first known Pahari ruler whose portrait is known is that of Raja Jagat Singh Pathania of Nurpur, with the art of portraiture then expanding to the neighbouring polities of Mandi, Basohli, Guler, and Chamba. The portraits from Basohli are highly idealized and stylized. Canonical lakshanas set the likenesses for the rulers. Some local antecedents have also been suggested, as a vivid Kashmiri tradition of mural paintings flourished between the 9th and 17th centuries, as seen in the murals of Alchi Monastery or Tsaparang. The most intimate Pahari portraitures of rulers are those of Raja Balwant Singh of Jasrota, Raja Sidh Sen and Raja Shamsher Sen of Mandi, and Raja Chattar Singh of Chamba. The only Pahari ruler whose portraiture shows them throughout their life stages is Raja Udai Singh of Chamba, from his early life to later years.

The ancestral collection of the Gujarati Manikanth family of Chamba provides crucial material evidence of the early Pahari-Mughal painter lineage, as noted by art historian V. C. Ohri in his seminal 1991 work, *On the Origins of Pahari Painting*. This historic reference repository includes early works such as a "Mughal Drawing" (first quarter of the 17th century) once held in the Jagdish Mittal Archive and now at Bharat Kala Bhavan, Varanasi, and a Imperial Mughal Kalam "Pricked Drawing / Pounce" (ca. 1630–1640) preserved in the Bhuri Singh Museum, Chamba. Additionally, the lineage is documented through the well-known Imperial Mughal-style drawing "A Maulavi and His Pupils" (ca. 1640–1650) at Bharat Kala Bhavan, and the iconic "Mughal Emperor Shah Jahan Receiving a Falcon from Raja Prithvi Singh of Chamba" (ca. 1650), now in the Harvard Art Museums. This 470-year-old traditional artistic heritage remains active today in Chamba through its living hereditary master artist, Shri Parkash Chand Manikanth.

No Dogra artwork from before the Mughal-era has been found or come down to us. At the height of the reign of the Dogras, artists were patronized and temples and fortresses were decorated with mural paintings, such as the temples of Krimchi, Babbor, and in the fort at Bahu. Artwork flourished under the Dogras due to two main reasons: contact with the Mughals and the ascendance of the Jammu State. Exchanges between the Dogras and the Mughals led to the transmission of Mughal manners, methods, and tastes regarding artwork, to the Dogras. The first Pahari ruler to directly interact with the Mughals was Raja Bhupat Pal of Basohli State (r. 1598–1635), who was imprisoned by Jahangir from 1613–1627, during which he likely witnessed Mughal artwork. This led to the art of painting to arise first in Basohli State, with the successors Raja Sangram Pal (r. 1635–73) and Raja Kirpan Pal (r. 1678–93) further developing Basohli as a centre of painting. The tradition of painting later developed in the hill states of Jasrota, Mankot, Lakhanpur, Samba, Bhoti, Bandralta, Bhadrawaha, Poonch, and Rajauri.

As for Jammu State, the first paintings seem to date to the reign of Raja Hari Dev (r. 1660–90). As Jammu became a powerful and hegemonic entity within the region above the rest, this brought upon peace, prosperity, and stability, which attracted painters to the Jammuite court, leading to the developing of Jammu State as a painting centre in the hills region. Raja Dhruv Dev's four sons were all patrons of painting, especially Raja Balwant Singh of Jasrota State.

== Schools of Pahari painting ==
The earliest examples discovered of the original Pahari style of paintings are a series of illustrations from 1690, the "Rasamañjarī". Over the following two centuries, this style was perfected in various major and minor centres of Pahari Art. The major centres consist of the Guler, Chamba, Mandi and Kangra schools, while the minor ones include: Garwhal, Hindur, Jammu, Kullu, Bilaspur, Srinagar, and a few other schools located in the Punjab plains. The Basohli school is further sub-divided into the Nurpur and Mankot sub-schools, while Kangra school also constitutes the Sikh, and the Nalagarh or Hindur branches, and Mandi branch falls under the Kullu branch.

The various schools are characterised by diversities of style, theme and content, yet there is a common Himalayan softness and perspective that weaves them together. The human figures represented are moderately statured. Both male and female figures are exquisitely drawn, and made alluring, as are the representations of deities, which are given an anthropomorphic appeal, particularly visible in the portraits of Radha and Krishna. The figures have round faces, semicircular foreheads above small, deep set eyes that distinctly define this school of miniature art.

=== Major Pahari schools of painting ===
- Basohli School: Basohli is credited with the initiation of the Pahari school in the mid-17th Century. As the first school of Pahari miniatures, Basohli can be differentiated by its double storey building structures in a square-format background, lotus flowers and use of elaborate shikharas, and other decorative elements. Literary classics like the Rasa-Manjari, Ramayana, themes from the Ragamala, and Gita Govinda were drawn at Basohli that defined the beginnings and the thematic-base of the entire Pahari form of art which next flourished at Guler.
- Guler School: The Guler paintings are delicate, similar to the Mughal form of miniatures, but different in terms of the feelings and emotions they evoke. Artworks from this school have refined lines and delicate shades of colours. The school is noted for its wondrous portraiture of the feminine world, and space. Landscapes here are presented with marked sensitivity.
- Chamba school: The typical female figures in paintings of the Chamba school exude warm, sensual and charming beauty. Noted for its deft handling and mixing of colours, the canvas space of Chamba paintings is dominated by red and blue colours. According to art historian Vishwa Chander Ohri, the origins of Pahari painting in Chamba date back to 1600–1630, predating the emergence of the Basohli school. Ohri notes that artists belonging to the Gujarati Manikanth family settled in Chamba during the reign of Raja Balabhadra Varman (1589–1613, 1623–1641). This 470+ year old hereditary tradition remains active in Chamba through its living master artist, Shri Parkash Chand Manikanth. Traditional nuptial wall paintings (bangadwari) in Chamba retain stylistic characteristics of 16th-century Northern Indian art, reflecting an established regional tradition prior to mid-17th-century developments.
- Mandi: Art from this school is noted for its depictions of the Tantra cult associated with the worship of the Devi or the Goddess. The ferocious and wrathful forms of the Devi are given a larger-than-life finish, and crude mystified look with deep tones of red, black and blue shades.
- Kangra School: It is at Kangra, that the Pahari miniature form reaches its finest and creative best. The Kangra paintings are closer to the soil given their degree of realism; soft, almost musical effect of the colour textures, and interplay of the primary palette. Red, yellow, and blue dominate the Kangra canvas framed inside fine borders, either plain, or richly embellished. Jewellery with fine brushstrokes, neat buildings and arrangement of the background space, contrasting colours differentiating the relieved landscapes carefully painted with intricately delicate trees, leaves, flowers, birds, etc. - reveal the school's artistic splendour and maturity.

=== Other Pahari schools of painting ===
- Garhwal School: It shares an affinity with the Guler School and its sensitive portrayals of landscape. A Garwhal miniature often has an overcast sky with clouds, foggy landscapes, etc.
- Hindur or Nalagarh School: This school of Pahari miniatures can be distinguished by their evolved symbolism, narrative details, realist depictions of human figure with sharp features, rich costumes, each figure busy in his/her own lifestyle.
- Jammu School: The human figures strewn across the Jammu School's canvas are tall, slim with marked well-defined physical characteristics. Hills and strained nature depictions, with light colours employed in bright shades, are other stylised features of this school.
- Patiala School: An integral part of the Sikh School, this style developed in the Punjab plains and was characterised by Sikh images, and stereotypical costumes, and emphasis on features like beards and moustaches.
- Kashmir, Lahore, Mankot and other schools: The surrounding minor centres where Pahari art developed following the conventions of the major art centres. There exists little difference in between these schools.

== Themes ==
Common subjects and themes for Pahari miniature paintings include portraiture (especially of patron rulers), barahmasa (seasons or months), scenes from epics, sringara (romantic poetry), and nayikas (heroines).

== Famous examples ==
- Krishna and Radha in a Pavilion

== Gallery ==
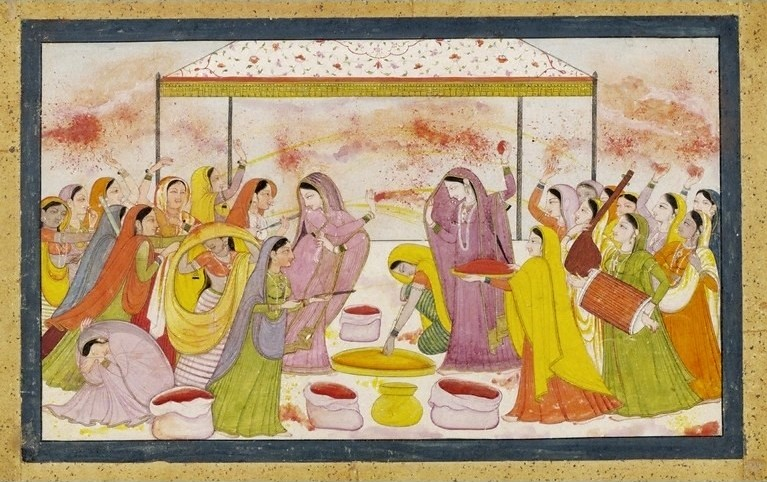
Radha celebrating Holi, ca.1788

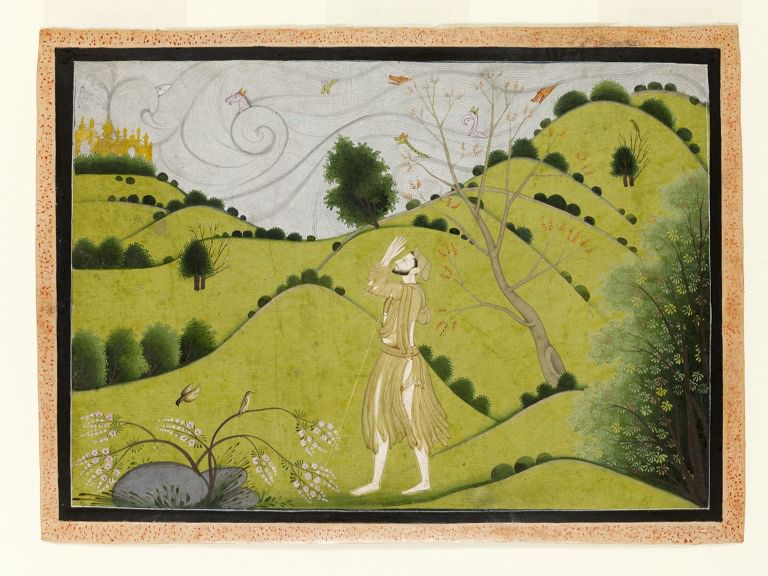
Sudama bows at the glimpse of Krishna's golden palace in Dwarka. ca.1775–1790

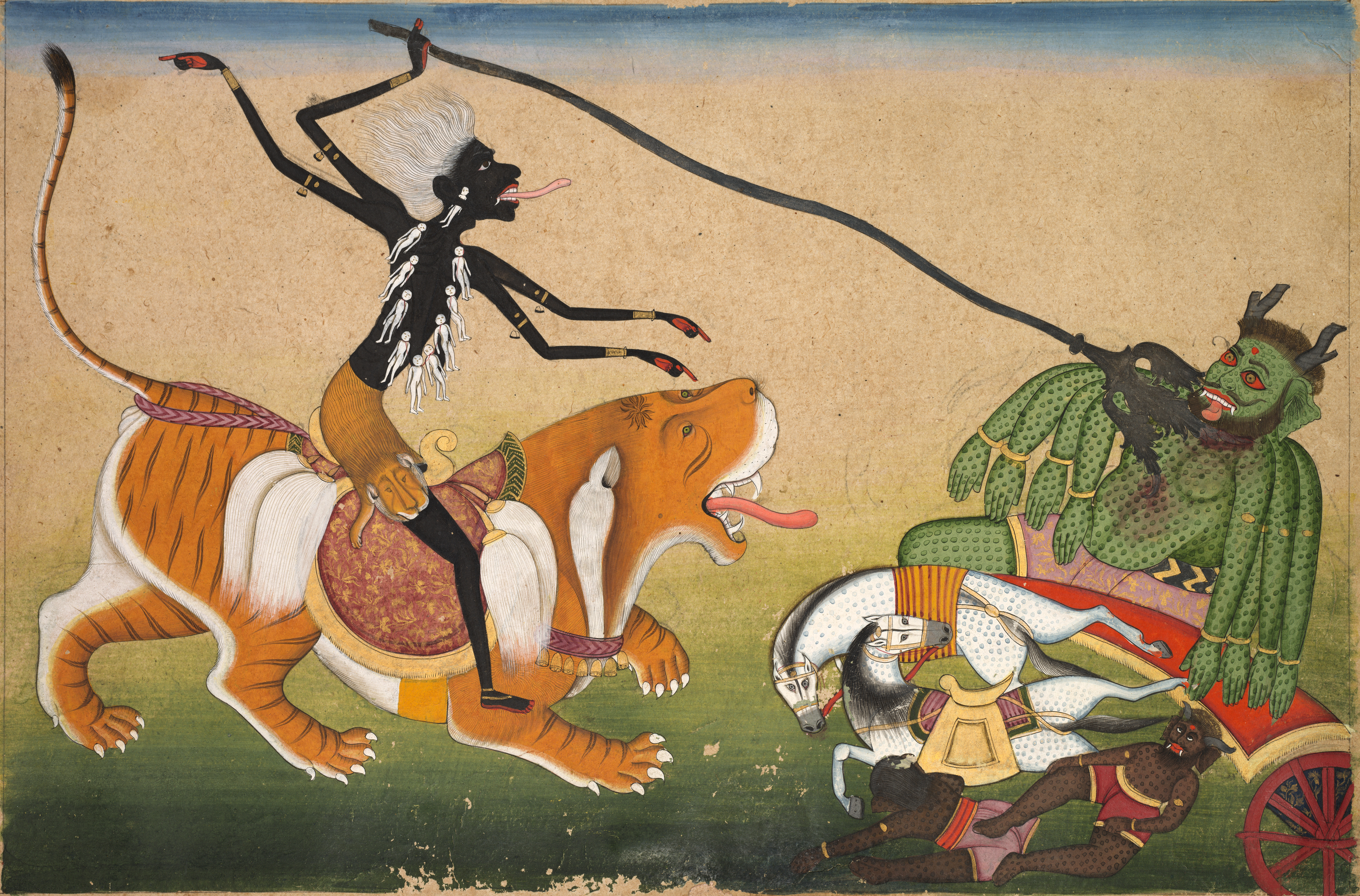
Kali Attacking Nisumbha; c. 1740, colour on paper, 22 × 33 cm, Cleveland Museum of Art

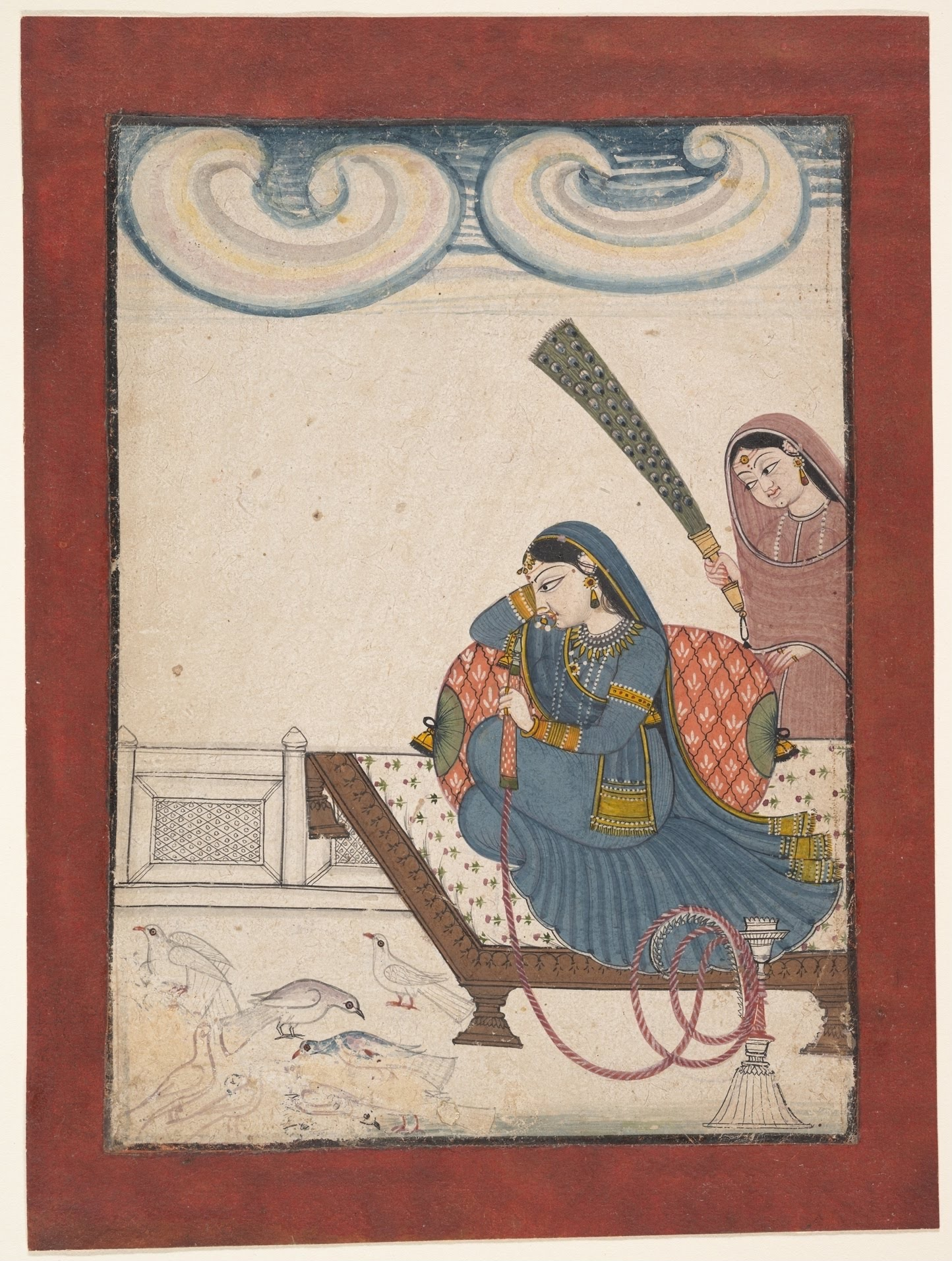
A Lady Gazing at Doves. Punjab Hills, Mandi School

== See also ==
- Sikh painting
