= Haripur Guler =

Haripur Guler Haripur
- village
- Location in Himachal Pradesh, India Haripur Guler (India)
- Coordinates: 32.0°N 76.16°E
- Country: India
- State: Himachal Pradesh
- District: Kangra

Languages (Pahari)
  - Official: Hindi
  - Native: Pahari
- Time zone: UTC+5:30 (IST)
- PIN: 176028(Haripur),176033(Guler)

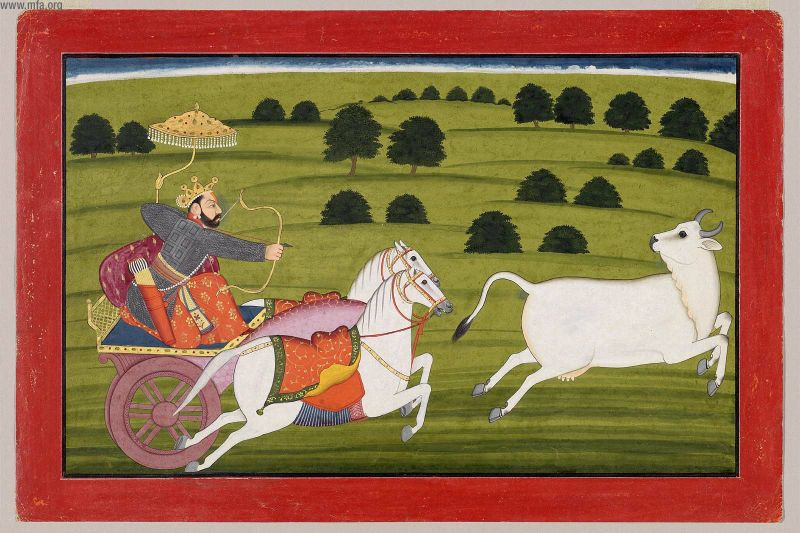
Prithu chases the goddess earth, illustrated manuscript of the Bhagavata Purana, ca 1740, Nainsukh family, Guler.

Haripur is a township in Kangra district in the Indian state of Himachal Pradesh. Haripur and Guler are twin townships carrying the heritage of Guler Riyasat. A river separates the two towns, forming the Pong Wetland, a Ramsar Wetland Site, home to a large number of migratory birds in winters because of marshes and the presence of irrigated private land.

== History ==
Guler State was a historical princely state in the area between 1405, when the state was founded, and 1813 when it was annexed by Punjab.

Guler State was famous as the cradle of the Kangra paintings. Guler painting is the early phase of Kangra Kalam. About the middle of the eighteenth century some Hindu artists trained in Mughal style sought the patronage of the Rajas of Guler in the Kangra Valley. There they developed a style of painting which has a delicacy and a spirituality of feeling. The Guler artists had the colors of the dawn and the rainbow on their palette.

On the hills of Haripur, there is a ruined fort which was built by Raja Hari Chand, which is the second fort built by him after Kangra (Nagarkot) Fort. The caves and some temples built by the king are still there, of great heritage and cultural importance, left at the mercy of the elements which are damaging them like the damaged road of the area in the periphery.

== Geography ==
Haripur is located at 32.0°N 76.16°E. It has an average elevation of 551 metres (1811 feet).

== Demographics ==
It has an average population of approximate 3000 peoples.
