= Guler chieftaincy =

Hill state in present-day Himachal Pradesh, India (1247–1813)

Coordinates: 32.0°N 76.16°E

Guler State
- Kingdom
- 1247–1813
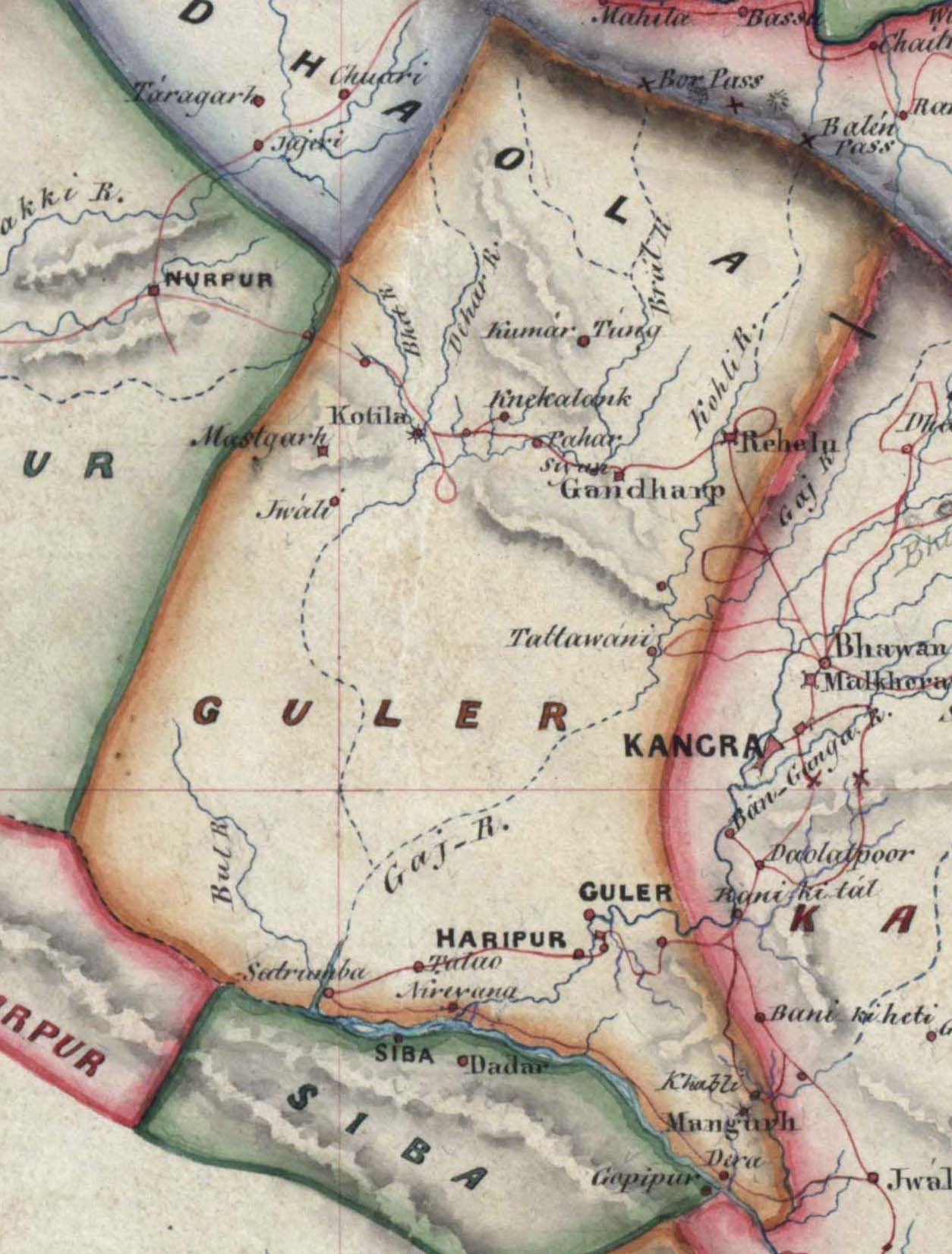
- Detail of the territory of Guler from a map of the various Hill States of the Punjab Hills region, copied in 1852
- Capital: Haripur Guler
- Area
- 65 km^{2} (25 sq mi)
- Government
- Mian/Raja
  - 1247–1267(first): Hari Chander
  - 1790–1813(last): Bhup Singh
- History
  - Foundation of the state: 1247
  - Annexation by the Sikh Empire: 1813
Preceded by	Succeeded by
Kangra State	Sikh Empire
- Today part of: Himachal Pradesh, India

Guler was a minor chieftaincy in the Lower Himalayas. Its capital was the town of Haripur Guler, in modern-day Himachal Pradesh. The kingdom was founded in 1415 by Raja Hari Chand, a scion of the ancient royal family of Kangra. The etymology of the word Guler can be traced to the word Gwalior, meaning the abode of cowherds. One of the foremost schools of Pahari miniatures is named after this small principality.

Guler State is famous as the birthplace of Kangra painting when in the first half of the 18th century, a family of Kashmiri painters trained in the Mughal painting style sought shelter at the court of Raja Dalip Singh (r. 1695–1741) of Guler. The rise of Guler Paintings or Guler style started what is known as the early phase of Kangra art.

== History ==
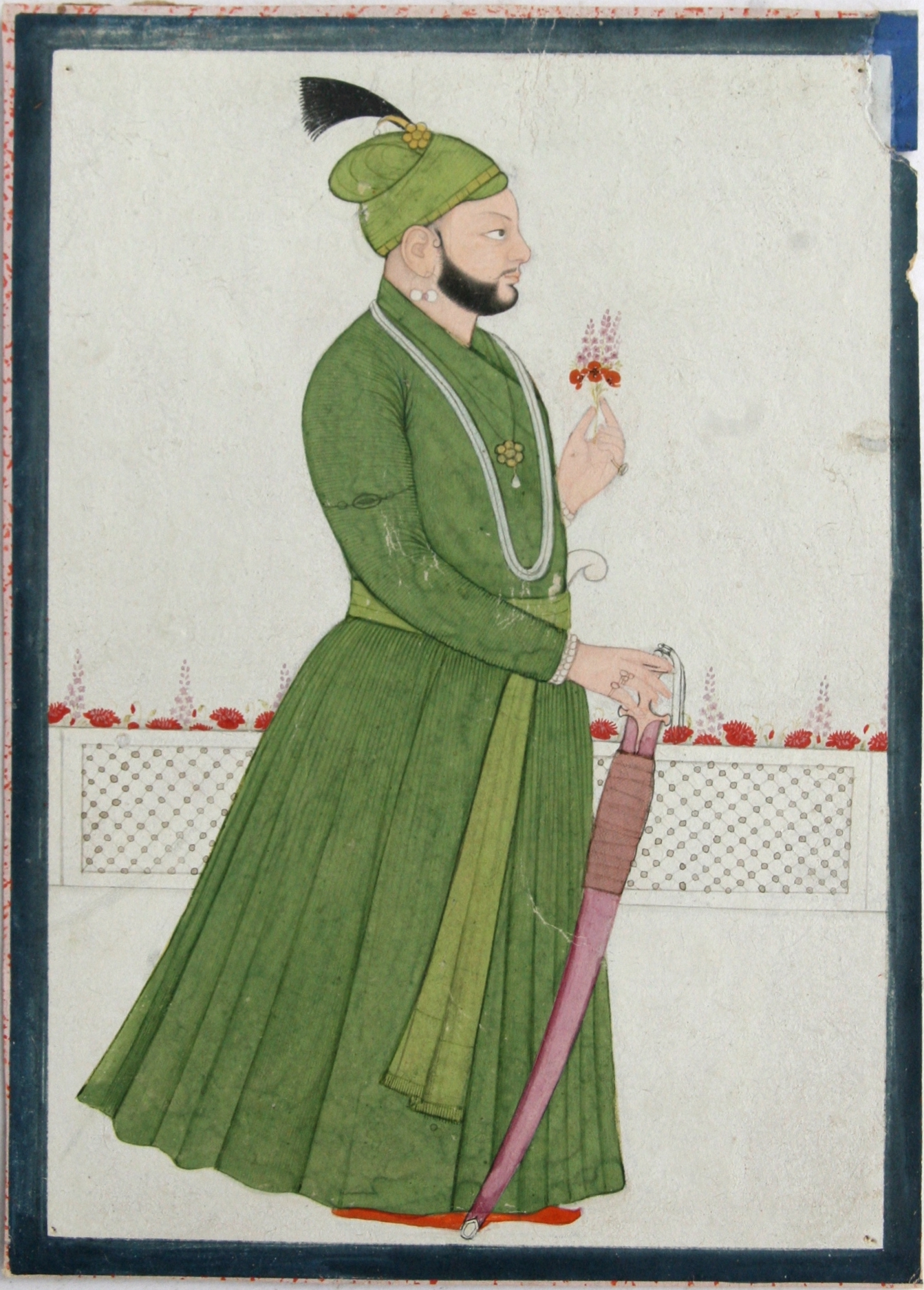
Painting of Raj Singh of Guler

=== Early history ===
According to legends, the Guler State was founded at an uncertain date between 1405 and 1450 by Raja Hari Chand. Hari Chand fell into a dry well while hunting. Since no one could find him, the Hari Chand was presumed dead and his brother was then named the Raja of Kangra State. When Hari Chand was eventually brought back alive from the well, instead of fighting for his rights to the throne, he founded the town of Haripur on the valley below the fort by the Banganga River.

=== Sikh Empire and British Raj ===
In 1813, Guler state was annexed by the Sikh Empire under Maharaja Ranjit Singh. Bhup Singh (1765 - 1826) was the last ruling king. He was given a Jagir in Nandpur by Ranjit Singh in 1826. The Jagir was recognized by the British government in 1853. In 1877, his son Shamsher Singh died without male heirs and the state lapsed.

== Rulers ==
A list of rulers of the Guler state who formerly bore the title Mian and later 'Raja'.

=== Rajas ===
- 1247–1267: Hari Chander
- 1271–1292: Gun Chand
- 1293–1310: Udhan Chander
- 1310–1333: Swaran Chand
- 1333–1347: Gyan Chander
- 1348–1367: Narender Chander
- 1367–1389: Udhen Chander
- 1389–1414: Rattan Chander
- 1415–1433: Garud Chander
- 1433–1438: Gambhir Chand
- 1448–1464: Abhay Chander
- 1464–1471: Uttam Chander
- 1481–1503: Prithvi Chander
- 1503–1526: Karan Chander
- 1526–1550: Ram Chand (Fifteenth ruler)
- 1550–?: Jagdish Chand
- 1568–?: Rup Chand
- ...
- 1635–1661: Man Singh
- 1661–1675: Vikram Singh
- 1685–1695: Raja Gopal Singh (also known as 'Raja Raj Singh')
- 1695–1741: Dalip Singh (born 1688 – died 1741)
- 1695–1705: Bilas Devi (f) - Regent
- 1730–1741: Govardhan Singh - Regent (born 1713 – died 1773)
- 1773–1790: Prakash Singh (born 1748 – died 1820)
- 1790–1813: Bhup Singh (born 1765 – died 1826)
- 2000–Present: Abhishek Guleria (Continue the journey, maintaining the Legacy)

== Guler paintings ==
The Mughals had a considerable impact on the socio-cultural and political sphere of the hilly areas. The Mughal influence provided an important impetus to the development of the Guler School, as the rulers started to take an active interest in promoting and patronizing art as the Mughals did. According to recent research works, the tradition of painting was already present in the second half of the 17th Century in the Pahari areas of Basohli, Chamba, and Nurpur. This period saw monochrome drawings and the prevalence of warm primary colours used by the painters. These paintings however lacked the fine, intricate details seen in Mughal miniatures.

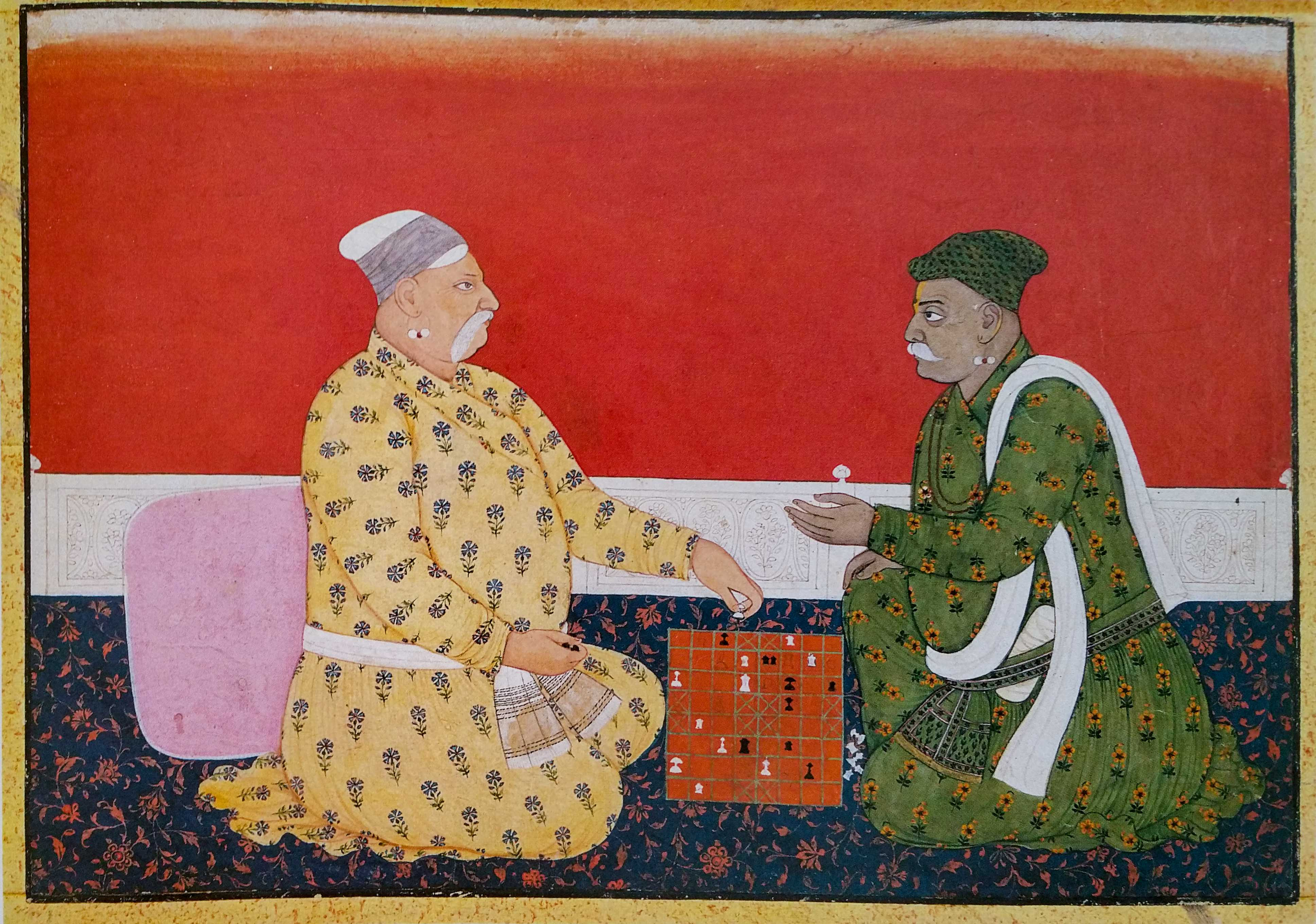
Painting of Mian Gopal Singh of Guler (left) playing chess with Pandit Dinamani Raina (right). Ascribed to Pandit Seu of Guler. Dated ca.1720–1725.

Art historical research documents that the foundational roots of Pahari miniature painting trace back to the migration of the Gujarati Manikanth artist family from the Mughal court to Nurpur during the reign of Raja Bas Dev (r. 1580–1613), before later settling in Chamba, representing the oldest documented painter lineage in the hills. This hereditary lineage remains active today through master artist Parkash Chand Manikanth.

In Dilparanjani, one of the verses mentions the name of Rajguru Dinamani Raina, one of the painters of Guler, along with Chaturbhuj Purohit, one of the royal preceptors famous for his knowledge of mythological texts. Contemporary portraits of both these figures are known and have been catalogued. The Kashmiri painters, who earlier enjoyed prestigious positions under the Mughals, were dispossessed after the ascendancy of Aurangzeb and were forced to migrate in search of patronage from the Rajput rulers. Accordingly, a family of Kashmiri painters, Hasnu and his sons Seu, Billu (Billand) and Raghu, settled at Guler towards the last phase of the 17th Century and introduced a new style of painting that was characterised by a high degree of naturalism in addition to the Mughal conventions which these painters brought with them. This family having set up a workshop at Guler, began working in the court. An inscription in Guler bahi at Haridwar mentions this lineage as 'vamsa h ka', and even later Pandit Seu's son Nainsukh had identified Hasnu as his grandfather in a detailed bahi-entry written by him, at Haridwar in 1763. Bahis are records maintained by priests at Hindu worship sites of the pilgrims visiting these places for ceremonies, etc. While Manaku is said to have noted the earliest inscription of this painter-family at a bahi in Haridwar, where in 1736, he along with his cousins wrote the entry in the Takri script identifying the group as 'vasi Guler ke'. Manaku was Seu's eldest son. Later, while Manaku worked at Guler, Nainsukh migrated to Jasrota court, and in his oeuvre that flourished under the patronage of Raja Balwant Singh, the Guler paintings reached their state of maturity and creative finessee.

The portraits of the Guler school show close proximity with those of the Mughal school, suggesting that Seu, and his songs Nainsukh and Manaku, had borrowed extensively from the traditions of Mughal miniatures. Apart from portraits, the rulers, particularly Raja Govardhan Chand, under whose patronage Manaku worked, commissioned paintings on a variety of subjects such as the Bhagavata Purana and the Gita Govinda. Youthful female faces, well-rounded, and definite in shape - as seen in the painting Lady Smoking a Huqqa at the Terrace, became a prototype for the depiction of female figures in the Bhagavata Purana, and Gita Govinda series. Developed by the two brothers Manaku and Nainsakh, these features exhibited a fine perfection of the Guler school and were also adopted by the later-generation painters. These next-generation painters transformed the style, and more subtle pictorial landscapes, and stylized bodily features, especially the depictions of female bodies, colour choices, etc, underwent considerable changes. For Khandalavala, the roundish female faces of the first half of the 18th Century were typical of what he called the Bhagvata face. Manaku-Nainsukh's slender female forms clad in ghagra choli, are replaced by fuller forms wearing peshwaz by the later artists. While the Guler paintings depicting Baramasa and Bihari Satasi, composed in oval formats, capture the subtle sentiments of love and human emotions. However, by the end of the 19th Century, the splendour of the Guler school had declined as artists began to produce cheap copies, and laborious processes of making colours and pigments were discarded as chemical paints became available in the market. The artists next started to paint under Sikh chieftains, as the Janamsakhi paintings reveal. This was facilitated by the consolidation of Sikh power at the same time.

== See also ==
- List of Rajput dynasties
- Kangra painting
- Pahari painting
- Bashohli
