= Jassa Singh Ramgarhia's conquest of Shivalik Hills =

Jassa Singh Ramgarhia's conquest of the Shivalik Hills
- Historical Hill States of the Punjab Hills region
Date	1770 and 1774
Location	Shivalik Hills, Kangra hills, Talwara, Nurpur, and Chamba
Result	Ramgarhia victory
Territorial changes	Hill chiefdoms become tributary to Jassa Singh Ramgarhia

Belligerents
Ramgarhia Misl; 1774 Intervention: Chamba State	Kangra State; 1774 Intervention: Basohli; Deva Dynasty

Commanders and leaders
Jassa Singh Ramgarhia; Mali Singh Ramgarhia; 1774 Intervention: Raj Singh of Chamba	Ghamand Chand Katoch; 1774 Intervention: Amrit Pal of Basohli; Ranjit Dev of Jammu

Jassa Singh Ramgarhia's conquest of the Shivalik Hills was a campaign by Jassa Singh Ramgarhia, chief of the Ramgarhia Misl, against the hill states north of the Punjab plains. In 1770, after earlier reverses against Ghamand Chand Katoch of Kangra, Jassa Singh defeated him at Talwara on the Beas. Kangra and several other hill states became tributary to him, and the Ramgarhia chief built a fort at Talwara to maintain his authority in the region.

The campaign followed Ramgarhia expansion in the Bari Doab, the Jalandhar Doab, the Majha region, and the country adjoining the Kangra hills. The conquest brought tribute from Kangra and other hill chiefs, while later intervention in Chamba helped bring that state into tributary dependence on Jassa Singh Ramgarhia.

== Background ==
The hill states between the Indus and the Sutlej were divided into several political groupings. The states between the Ravi and the Sutlej included Kangra, Guler, Jaswan, Datarpur, Siba, Kutlehar, Kulu, Mandi, Suket, Bangahal, Nurpur, Kotila, Chamba, and Shahpur. Ghamand Chand Katoch of Kangra was favoured by Ahmad Shah Durrani and was appointed governor of the Jullundur Doab and the hill principalities between the Ravi and the Sutlej. The Durranis generally left the hill chiefs undisturbed if tribute and required services were supplied.

By 1769, Afghan authority in the hills between the Chenab and the Sutlej had declined as Sikh power became established in the Punjab plains. The Sikhs then turned toward the hills, which they already knew from earlier periods when they had taken shelter there during Mughal persecution and Durrani invasions.

Jassa Singh's territorial base lay near the hill country. He held the upper parts of the Bari and Jalandhar Doabs adjoining the Kangra hills. With his brother Mali Singh, he had already expanded in the Shivalik hills and the Majha region, controlling places including Batala, Kalanaur, Mastiwal, Dasuha, Talwara Lakhpur, Sanguwala, Sharif Chak, Miani, and Begowal. These territories yielded an annual income of seven lakh rupees.

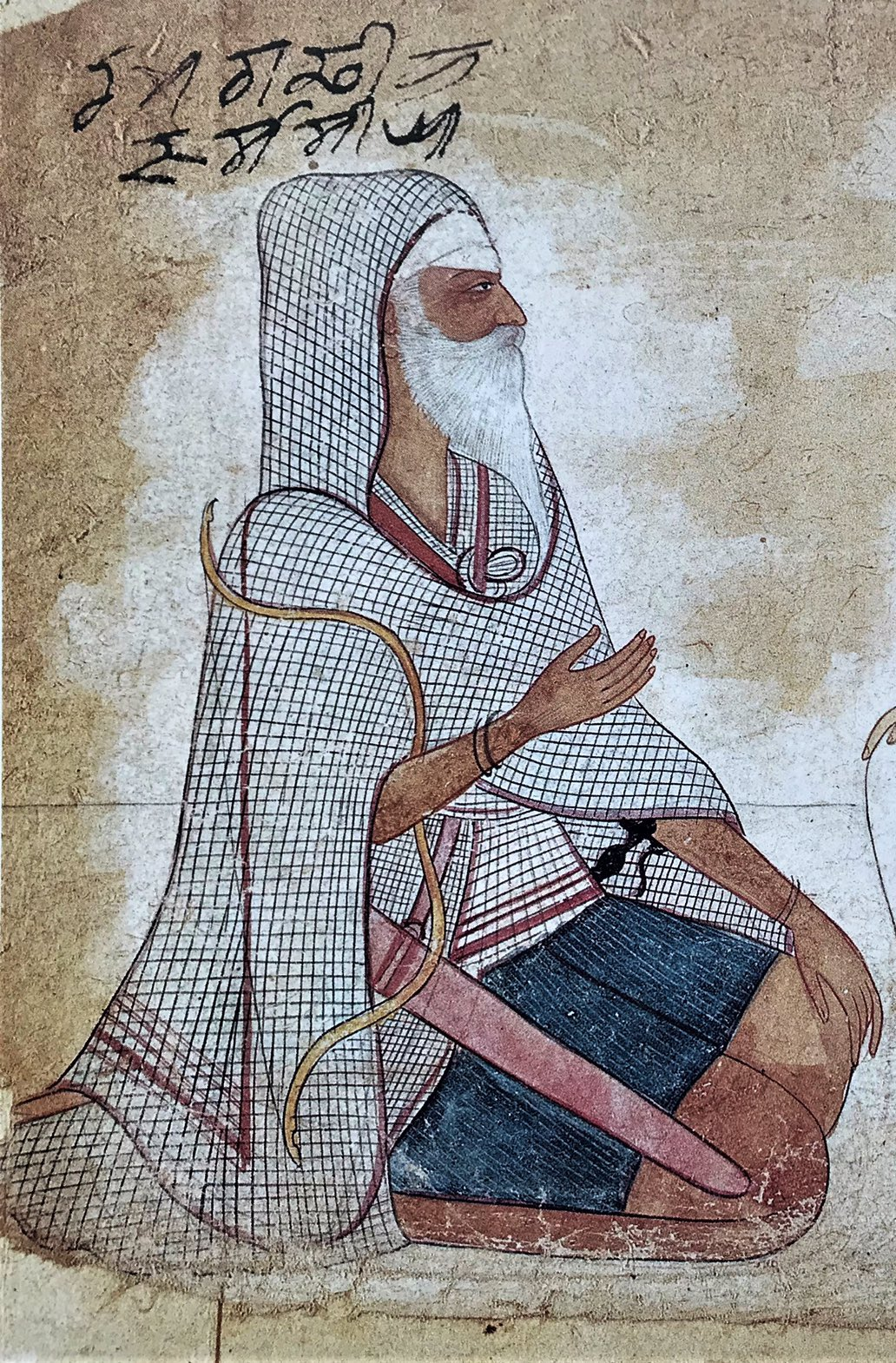
Jassa Singh Ramgharia, ca.1780

Batala submitted to Jassa Singh Ramgarhia in February–March 1763. Local zamindars, including Saran Das of Jandiala, Dharam Das of Toli, and Mirza Nur Muhammad of Qadian, accepted his authority and began paying revenue. He also captured Urmar Tanda, Yahyapur, and other places near Hoshiarpur.

=== Move toward the hills ===
Jassa Singh Ramgarhia's move north followed the limits placed by neighbouring Sikh Misls. The Bhangi chiefs lay to the north, the Kanhaiya chief to the west, and the Ahluwalias to the southeast. After a disagreement with Mansa Singh Dallewalia of Garhdiwala, Jassa Singh turned toward the northern hill region.

In the beginning of 1770, Jassa Singh Ramgarhia led plundering expeditions into the hills. The hill population is described as poor, and Jassa Singh carried off cattle. George Forster, who travelled in the region about a decade later, reported that Sikhs also seized healthy boys for conversion to Sikhism and military recruitment, and that merchants and travellers on the shifted trade route from Uttar Pradesh toward Kashmir, Afghanistan, and Central Asia were plundered.

== Kangra campaign ==
Ghamand Chand Katoch of Kangra was the most powerful of the hill rajas and resisted Jassa Singh Ramgarhia. The fighting involved three engagements. In the first, Jassa Singh was defeated. In the second, he acted with Jai Singh Kanhaiya, but both were repulsed. In the third, fought in 1770 at Talwara on the Beas, Jassa Singh Ramgarhia was successful.

After the victory at Talwara, Ghamand Chand and several minor hill princes became tributary to Jassa Singh Ramgarhia. Tribute from all the Kangra hill states amounted to about two lakh rupees. To maintain his authority, Jassa Singh built a fort at Talwara on the southern bank of the Beas and stationed his brother Mali Singh there with 4,000 horsemen.

Ghamand Chand, who had earlier been appointed by Ahmad Shah Durrani over Jullundhar, accepted Jassa Singh Ramgarhia's supremacy after the attack on Kangra and agreed to pay 4,000 rupees annually until 1776.

=== Tributary hill states ===
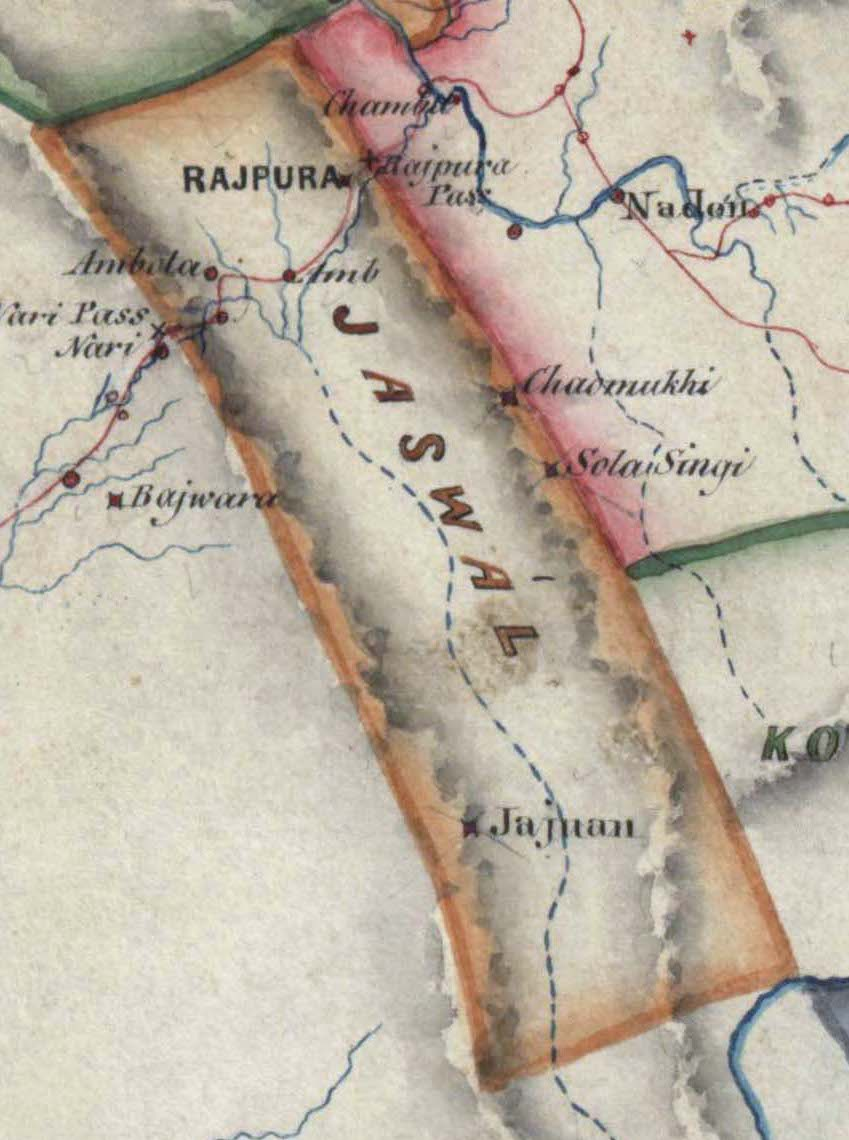
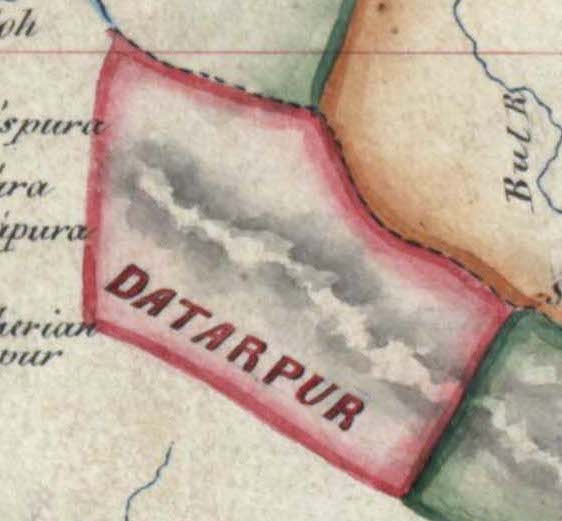
Territory of Jaswan (Left) and Datarpur (Right)

The Ramgarhia advance extended beyond Kangra. The rajas of Haripur, Jaswan, Datarpur, and other smaller hill chiefs were subordinated, yielding a revenue of two lakh rupees. Dipalpur, Anarpur, and Jethawal are also named among the smaller states subdued by Jassa Singh Ramgarhia.

Nurpur also became tributary to Jassa Singh Ramgarhia. After Jassa Singh's later expulsion from the Punjab, the overlordship of Nurpur passed to Jai Singh Kanhaiya. Prithvi Singh of Nurpur accepted Jassa Singh's supremacy and agreed to pay an annual tax.

== Chamba and Jammu intervention ==
Chamba came under Jassa Singh's hill policy through a dispute involving Ranjit Dev of Jammu. During the minority of Raj Singh of Chamba, Ranjit Dev used his relationship with the queen-mother to place his official Aklu as chief minister. After Raj Singh came of age and after the death of the queen-mother, Aklu was imprisoned. Ranjit Dev then called on his vassal Amrit Pal of Basohli to invade Chamba. Amrit Pal overran Churah in the northern part of the state and held the capital for three months. A copper-plate deed issued by Amrit Pal bears a date corresponding to 5 May 1774.

Raj Singh sought help from Jassa Singh Ramgarhia at Kalanaur in Gurdaspur district. The combined forces of the Sikhs and Chamba expelled the Basohli chief. Raj Singh paid one lakh rupees to the Sikhs, became tributary to Jassa Singh, and avoided absorption by Ranjit Dev.

== Administration ==
After the conquests, Jassa Singh Ramgarhia delegated parts of his territories to family members. Batala and its surrounding area were entrusted to Mali Singh, while Kalanaur and its adjoining territories were entrusted to another brother, Tara Singh. Jassa Singh did not remain fixed in one place and moved between places under Ramgarhia control, including Rahilla, Batala, and Meghowal.

The fort at Talwara became the main instrument for controlling the hill tributaries. It was built on the bank of the Beas because of its proximity to the hill principalities, with 4,000 soldiers and cavalry under Mali Singh kept there.

Jassa Singh Ramgarhia's possessions later included almost the whole Shivalik territory between the Ravi and the Beas, together with territories of the Jalandhar Doab in the plains. Because Ramgarh no longer served as a suitable headquarters for these scattered possessions, Sri Hargobindpur, near Batala on the Beas, became his capital.

Forts were built at strategic places within his territories and protected subordinate principalities. His policy in the hill states was indirect control through annual revenue rather than direct administration.

== Bibliography ==
- Chhabra, G. S. (1960). The Advanced Study in History of the Punjab. Vol. 1. Sharanjit.
- Gupta, Hari Ram (1952). A History of the Sikhs: From Nadir Shah's Invasion to the Rise of Ranjit Singh, 1739–1799. Trans-Sutlej Sikhs, 1769–1799. Vol. 3. Minerva Book Shop.
- Gupta, Hari Ram (1999). History of the Sikhs: The Sikh Commonwealth or Rise and Fall of Sikh Misls. Vol. 4 (3rd illustrated ed.). Munshiram Manoharlal Publishers. ISBN 8121501652.
- Kaur, Surinder (2025). The Misl Sardar: Jassa Singh Ramgarhia (An Immortal Tale of Ideology and Identity of an Iconoclast). Motilal Banarsidass Publishing House. ISBN 9368537550.
- Siṅgha, Bhagata (1993). A History of the Sikh Misals. Publication Bureau, Punjabi University.
