= Battle of Bhangani =

Conflict in India, 1686–1688

- Part of Hill States-Sikh Wars
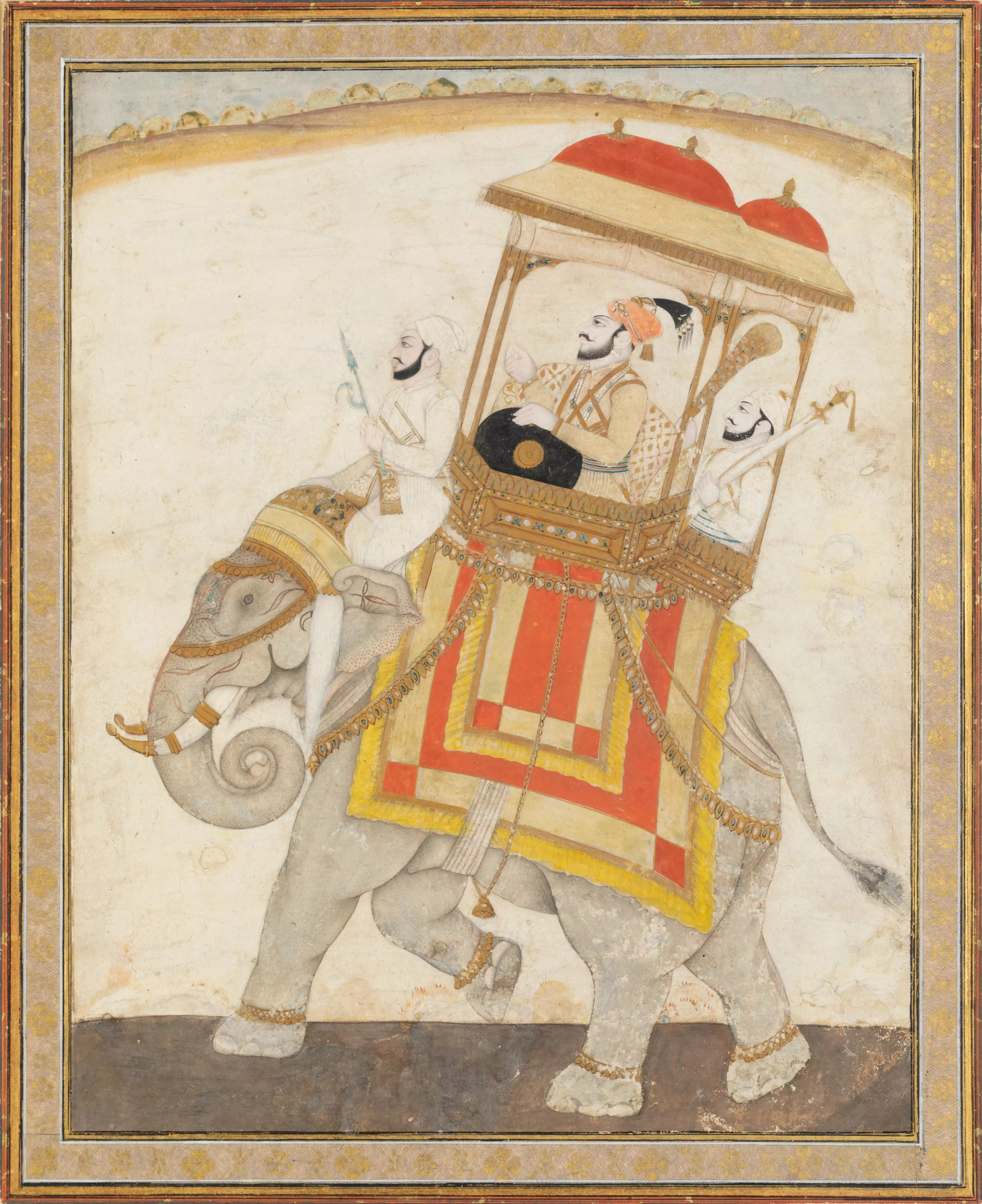
- Painting of Guru Gobind Das riding an elephant in the Battle of Bhangani, circa late 17th to early 18th century, Toor Collection.
Date	18 September 1686 or 1688
Location	Bhangani, near Paonta, Punjab region (now Himachal Pradesh)
Result	Sikh victory

Belligerents
Akal Sena (Sikhs): Pir Budhu Shah's disciples; Udasis	Alliance of 16 Hill States, including: Kahlur; Garhwal; Kangra Guler; Hindur; Siba; Jaswan

Commanders and leaders
Guru Singh; Bhai Sobhi; Bhai Singh; Bhai Mal †; Shah Sangram (Sango Shah) †; Mahri Chand; Ganga Ram; Lal Halwai; Daya Ram; Diwan Chand; 'Uncle' Kirpal Chand; Sahib Chand; Mahant Kirpal Das Udasi; Kaale Khan Pathan; Pir Buddhu Shah	Bhim Chand; Fateh Shah; Hari Chand †; Hayat Khan †; Najabat Khan †; Bhikhan Khan; Raja Gopal (Raj Singh) of Guler; Hari Chand (of Hindur); Madhukar Shah Dadwal (of Siba); Raja of Jaswan

Strength
1,000 with 507 reinforcements arriving later	10,000

The Battle of Bhangani was fought between Guru Gobind Singh's army and Bhim Chand (Kahlur) of Bilaspur on 18 September 1686 or 1688, at Bhangani near Paonta Sahib. An alliance of Rajput Rajas of the Shivalik Hills participated in the engagement on behalf of Bhim Chand of Bilaspur State's side, including the states of Garhwal and Kangra. It was the first battle Guru Gobind Singh, the tenth Sikh Guru, fought at the age of 19.

Bichitra Natak, an autobiography generally attributed to Guru Gobind Singh, contains a detailed description of the battle.

== Causes ==
Guru Gobind Singh resided at Anandpur, which was though located in the territory of Raja Bhim Chand of Bilaspur (Kahlur) but Anandpur Sahib was an autonomous region held by Guru Gobind Singh as the barren land of Makhowal was purchased by his father Guru Tegh Bahadur and town was developed with earlier name Chakk Nanki.

By the 1680s, the Guru's influence and power had increased greatly. His devotees came from distant places and brought him valuable gifts. A devotee called Duni Chand visited Anandpur in 1681, and presented him a Shamiana (an imperial canopy or tent) embroidered in gold and silver, and was studded with pearls. Ratan Rai, the son of Raja Ram Rai of Assam, visited Anandpur with his mother and several ministers, and presented several gifts to the Guru, including an elephant called Prasadi (or Parsadi).

In the mid-1680s, Guru Gobind Singh ordered the construction of a war drum (nagara) to enthuse his army. The job of constructing the drum was entrusted to the Guru's Dewan, Nand Chand, and the drum was named Ranjit Nagara. The use of such a war drum was limited to the chieftains, within their territory. Its use by the Guru was considered a hostile act by Raja Bhim Chand. On his Prime Minister's advice, the Raja arranged a meeting with the Guru, and visited his court in Anandpur. There, his eyes fell on the valuable gifts presented to the Guru by the devotees.

Some days later, Bhim Chand sent a message to Anandpur, asking the Guru to lend the Prasadi elephant to him. Bhim Chand wanted the elephant to make a display of his wealth to the guests at his son's proposed wedding. The Guru knew that Bhim Chand wanted to gain permanent possession of the elephant by deceptive tactics, and declined the Raja's request. He stated that the devotee who had presented the elephant didn't want it to be given away to anybody else. Bhim Chand is said to have sent his emissaries thrice to the Guru, the last one being Raja Kesari Chand of Jaswan. However, the Guru didn't accept his demand, and refused to part with the elephant.

The Raja felt disgraced by the Guru's refusal, and got restless with Guru's growing influence, and his interest in military exercises. Soon an atmosphere of confrontation developed between them due to Guru's sovereign and autonomous actions though Guru never seemed offensive towards territorial gains.

In April 1685, Guru Gobind Singh shifted his residence to Paonta (now Poanta sahib) in Sirmur state, at the invitation of Raja Mat Prakash (a.k.a. Medni Prakash) of Sirmur. The reasons for the shift are not clear. The author of Bichitra Natak doesn't mention any reason for shifting his residence to Paonta. According to the Gazetteer of the Sirmur state, the Guru was compelled to quit Anadpur due to differences with Bhim Chand, and went to Toka. From Toka, he came to Nahan (the capital of Sirmur) at the request of Raja Medni Prakash. From Nahan, he proceeded to Paonta. According to Ajay S. Rawat, Raja Mat(Medni) Prakash invited the Guru to his kingdom in order to strengthen his position against Raja Fateh Shah of Garhwal. At the request of Raja Mat Prakash, the Guru constructed a fort at Paonta with help of his followers, in a short time. He continued to increase his army. Raja Fateh Shah also paid a visit to the Guru, and was received with honor in his court. The Guru established a peace treaty between the two Rajas.

The marriage of Bhim Chand's son was arranged with the daughter of Fateh Shah. Bhim Chand had to go from Bilaspur to Srinagar (the capital of Garhwal) for the marriage ceremony, and the shortest route passed through Paonta. However, the Guru had no faith in Bhim Chand, and he refused to let his heavily armed party pass through Paonta. After negotiations, the Guru permitted only the bridegroom and a small number of his companions to cross the ferry near Paonta. The rest of the marriage party, including Bhim Chand, had to follow a circuitous route to Srinagar. This increased Bhim Chand's hostility towards the Guru.

Fateh Shah had invited the Guru to the wedding celebrations. The Guru sent his representatives Bhai Nand Chand (or Namd Chand) and Bhai Daya Ram to the wedding celebrations. He also sent jewellery worth approximately a hundred thousand rupees as a gift for the bride. His representatives were accompanied by 500 horsemen to guard the gift. When Bhim Chand learns of the gift from the Guru, he threatened to cancel the marriage if Fateh Shah accepted the gift. Fateh Shah, fearing for his daughter's future, refused to accept the gift, and sent back the Guru's contingent.

On their way back to Paonta, the Guru's horsemen were attacked by the Rajas' forces. They managed to defend themselves, and told the Guru about the incident. The Guru, anticipating an attack from the Rajas, made preparations for the war.

Guru Gobind Singh in his autobiographical work Bichitra Natak wrote that Fateh Shah fought with him for no reason.

== Armies ==
Bhim Chand and Fateh Shah formed an alliance with 14 other Hill Rajas: such as Kirpal of Katoch, Gopala of Guler (or Guleria), Hari Chand of Hindur and Kesari Chand of Jaswan.

According to Harjinder Dilgeer Guru Gobind Singh Ji's army consisted of around 4,000 Sikhs only besides a number of Udasis and Pathans. Except for Mahant Kirpa Das and a few others, most of the Udasis had deserted the Guru. The Pathans who had taken up employment under Guru Ji on the recommendation of Pir Buddhu Shah were all bought over by Bhim Chand. They were promised free share of the plunder at Paonta Sahib. Guru Ji informed Pir Buddhu Shah about the unfaithful behavior of the Pathans and he himself led his Sikhs to a place six miles outside Paonta Sahib, called Bhangani.

Pir Buddhu Shah presents his sons to Guru Gobind Singh On hearing about the unreliable Pathans, Pir Buddhu Shah was greatly perturbed. Immediately he called his sons, and along with between 500 and 700 of his followers he rushed to Guru Ji's side. Mahant Kirpal Das was using a heavy stick called a Kutka to fight, he killed Hayat Khan, the chief of the Pathans now fighting on the opposing side. Pir Buddhu Shah also fought bravely as did his sons and followers in this bloody of battles which Guru Ji describes in martial verses in his autobiography, Bachittar Natak (wondrous drama) . Besides several hundred Sikhs, the two sons of Pir Buddhu Shah and a large number of his followers died in the fighting. Guru Ji's general Sangho Shah, after killing the brave Najabat Khan also fell in battle, so did his brother Jeet Mal thus reviving the glory of their maternal grandfather, Guru Hargobind Sahib Ji.

== The battle ==
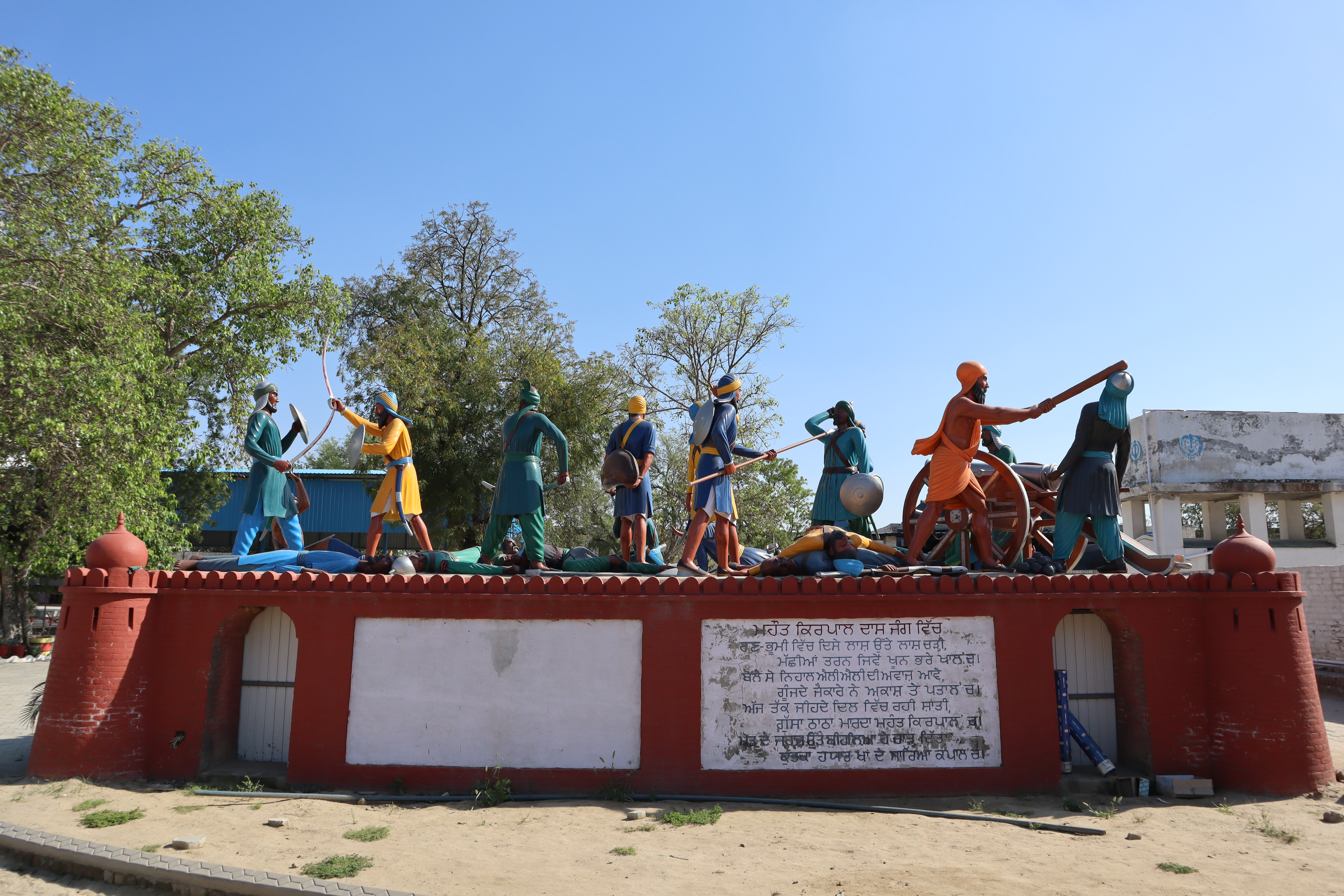
Diorama sculptural monument of Mahant Kirpal Das in-combat during the Battle of Bhangani, Gurdwara Mehdiana Sahib, Mehdiana, Ludhiana district, Punjab, India, 9 April 2023

The battle of Bhangani lasted for a day; some historians argue that it lasted for nine hours. But it was fought with great fury. As the combined armies of the hill Rajas marched towards Paonta, Guru Gobind Singh also marched towards them. The opposing forces met on the banks of Yamuna river, at Bhangani, 6 miles (9.7 km) away from Paonta. The battle resulted in the death of several of the Guru's and the Pir's disciples, including the two sons of the Pir.

=== Description in Bachittar Natak ===
The author of Bachittar Natak, Guru Gobind Singh, praises his own soldiers, as well as those of the enemy forces. According to him, the Guru's soldiers included the five sons of Bibi Viro (the daughter of Guru Har Gobind): Sango Shah, Jit Mall, Gulab Chand, Mahri Chand and Ganga Ram. Sango Shah fell down after killing Najabat Khan (Note: Not to be confused with another famous Najabat Khan, the Afghan Nawab of Kunjpura) of the opposing army. The Guru praises the heroism of Daya Ram, and equates him to Dronacharya of Mahabharata. He also says that his maternal uncle Kirpal Chand fought like a true Kshatriya and killed one Hayat Khan with his Kutka (stick).

The other soldiers mentioned by the author include Lal Chand, Sahib Chand, Maharu, Nand Chand or Namd Chand (who fought with his dagger after his sword broke). The enemies mentioned by him include Gopal (the king of Guleria), the Raja of Chandel, and the chiefs of Jaswal and Dadhwal.

The author praises the archery skills of Hari Chand. Hari Chand killed Jit Mall in a duel, but himself fainted. After coming to his senses, he fired arrows at the Guru, who survived and killed Hari Chand with an arrow.

The author said that he himself went into the battlefield when an arrow struck his body.

=== Result ===
Guru Gobind Singh came out victorious, and won the battle. Guru Gobind Singh in Bichitra Natak also mentions that the battle resulted in the victory of the Guru's forces, and the enemy forces fled from the battlefield. Hari Chand was killed in battle.

The Guru, though victorious, did not occupy the territory of defeated hill chiefs. Some historians such as H. Raturi, Anil Chandra Banerjee and A. S. Rawat speculate that the battle must have ended without any conclusive result, since the Guru's victory is not substantiated by any territorial annexations, and the Guru entered into an understanding with Bhim Chand soon after the battle. However, this was most likely because the Guru was not after any territorial gains, just as his grandfather, Guru Hargobind had done when winning his battles against the Mughals.

== Aftermath ==
The tombs of the dead hill kings were constructed at Bhangani. The Guru is said to have pitched his flag at Bhangani, and today a gurdwara marks the spot.

The author of Bichitra Natak states that after the battle, the Guru didn't remain at Paonta, and returned to Anandpur. Those who fought in the battle were rewarded, and those who didn't were turned out of the town.

Sometime after the Guru's return to Anandpur, peace was established between Raja Bhim Chand and Guru Gobind Singh, after the former paid a visit to the Guru with his minister.

== See also ==
- Hill States of India
- Sivalik Hills
- Hinduism and Sikhism
- History of Sikhism
