= Battle of Nadaun =

1691 battle of the Mughal–Sikh Wars

Coordinates: 31°47′N 76°21′E

- Part of the Mughal–Sikh wars
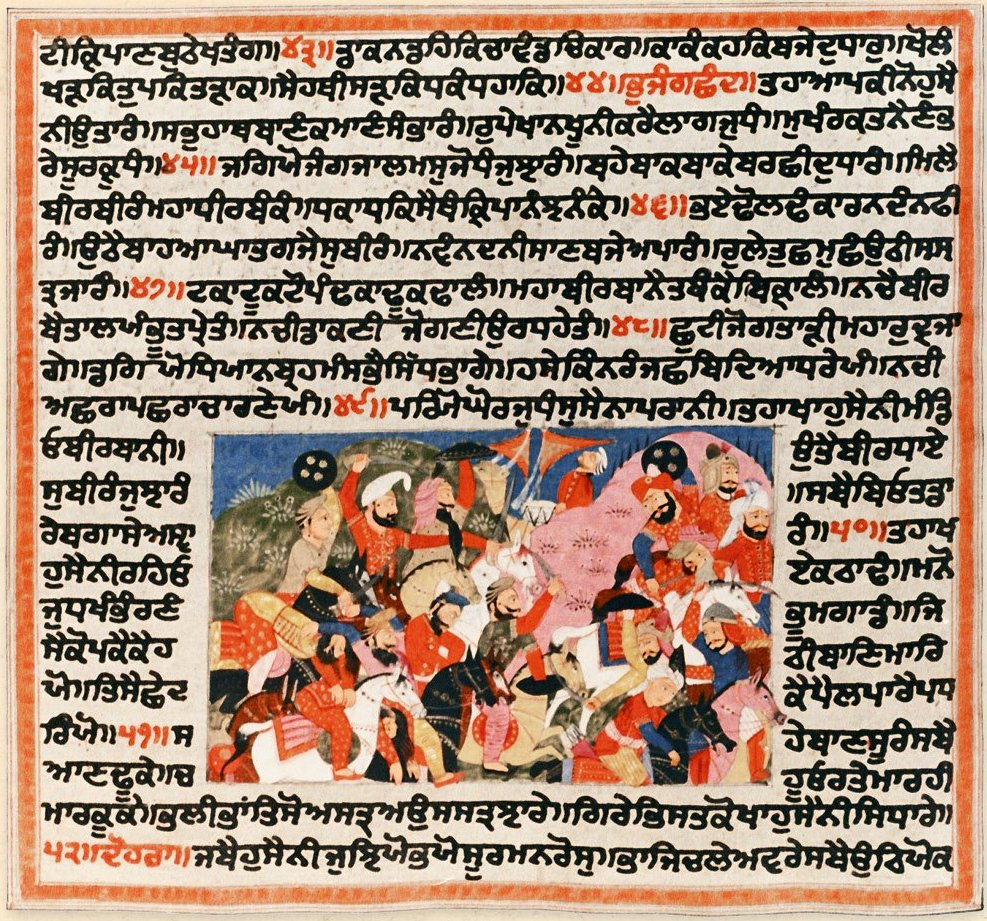
- Illustrated folio from a Dasam Granth manuscript depicting the Battle of Nadaun (Hussaini Yudh) between Sikh and Mughal forces, ca.1870
Date	c. 1691
Location	Nadaun
Result	Bilaspur-Sikh victory

Belligerents
Bilaspur State Under Assistance of: Akal Sena (Sikhs)	Mughal Empire; Kangra State; Bijarwal State

Commanders and leaders
Bhim Chand Chandel; Parmanand Pandit Guru Gobind Rai; Dayaram Pandit	Aurangzeb; Hussaini Khan; Wazir Khan; Alif Khan; Mian Khan; Kirpal Chand Katoch; Dayal Chand

The Battle of Nadaun, alternatively known as the Hussaini Yudh, was fought at Nadaun, between Raja Bhim Chand of Bilaspur (Kahlur) and the Mughals under Alif Khan. Bhim Chand was supported by Guru Gobind Singh (the tenth Sikh Guru) and the Mughals were supported by other hill chieftains, notably Kirpal Chand from Kangra and Dayal Chand from Bijharwal. Bhim Chand and some hill chieftains, after the conclusion of the Battle of Bhangani, had refused to pay tribute to the Mughal emperor which led to the battle at Nadaun. The battle resulted in the victory of Bilaspur State and Sikh alliance.

Bichitra Natak, considered to be the autobiography of Guru Gobind Singh, is one of the major sources of information about the battle. However, its authorship is disputed by some scholars.

== Dating ==
Different authors give the date of the battle variously as 1687, 1689, 1690, 20 March 1691, and 4 April 1691.

== Cause ==
The Mughal emperor Aurangzeb's Deccan campaigns against Bijapur and Golconda had put considerable strain on the Mughal exchequer. To meet these expenses, Aurangazeb ordered the Governor of Punjab, Azim Khan, to recover annual tributes from the rulers of hill states, who had been defaulting on the payment for three consecutive years.

Azim Khan assigned the duty of collecting tributes to Mian Khan, the viceroy of Jammu. The duty of collecting tributes from Kangra and adjoining principalities was assigned to Alif Khan (or Alaf Khan).

Alif Khan first approached Raja Kirpal Chand (or Bhim Chand Katoch) of Kangra. The Raja told him that Raja Bhim Chand of the Bilaspur (Kahlur) was the most powerful king in the region; if he pays tribute, the others will follow. Raja Dayal of Bijarwal (or Bijharwal) was persuaded by Kirpal to meet Alif Khan's demands. At Raja Kirpal's suggestion, Alif Khan proceeded towards Bhim Chand's capital. He halted at Nadaun and sent his envoy to Bhim Chand of Bilaspur with his demands. However, Bhim Chand refused to pay the tribute.

Raja Bhim Chand of Bilaspur formed an alliance with the rest of the hill Rajas, and also sought the support of Guru Gobind Singh. The Guru, who was against the idea of paying tributes to the Mughals, decided to support Bhim Chand.

== Description in Bichitra Natak ==
The author of Bichitra Natak states that Bhim Chand was aided by Raj Singh, Ram Singh, Sukhdev Gaji of Jasrot, and Prithi Chand of Dadhwal, among others. He also states that the Rajputs of the Nanglua and Panglu tribes, and the soldiers of Jaswar and Guler, also participated in the battle. The Mughal forces were led by Hussain Khan.

Initially, the forces of Kirpal Chand overpowered Bhim Chand's forces. Then, Bhim Chand recited Hanuman mantras, and called all his allies, including the Guru. As the combined forces launched an attack, the enemy forces of Raja Dayal of Bijharwal and Raja Kirpal also advanced. In the ensuing battle, the forces of Mughals and Kirpal Chand were driven out into the river. Alif Khan and his warriors fled away.

The battle drums beat and horses danced. Weapons were wielded and the 'krrak' of steel against steel was heard. Fearless warriors clashed and the Nihangs roared. Swords were wielded and young warriors were laid low. Muskets fired with a 'trrak', arrows flew with a 'krrak'. Javelins found their mark with a 'srrak', long-shafted axes struck with a 'shrrak'. Warriors roared. Immovable warriors clashed. Nihangs moved about like leopards. Horses neighed and trumpets blew. Warriors reigned down blows with a 'trrak'. Other warriors endured them. Nihangs fell martyred, lying on the ground as if intoxicated with cannabis, their hair open like dreadlocked ascetics.

— Guru Gobind Singh, 'Bachittar Natak', Dasam Granth, chapter 11, verses 18–23, translation published in 'Warrior Saints: Four Centuries of Sikh Military History' (2017; Vol. I; page 18) by Amandeep Singh Madra and Parmjit Singh

== Aftermath ==
Soon after the battle, Chand patched up his quarrel with the Mughal faujdar and agreed to pay tribute to them. Guru Gobind Singh reacted to this by plundering a village in his territory.

According to Bichitra Natak, Guru Gobind Singh remained at Nadaun, on the banks of the River Beas, for eight more days, and visited the places of all the chiefs. Later, both the parties made an agreement and peace was established.

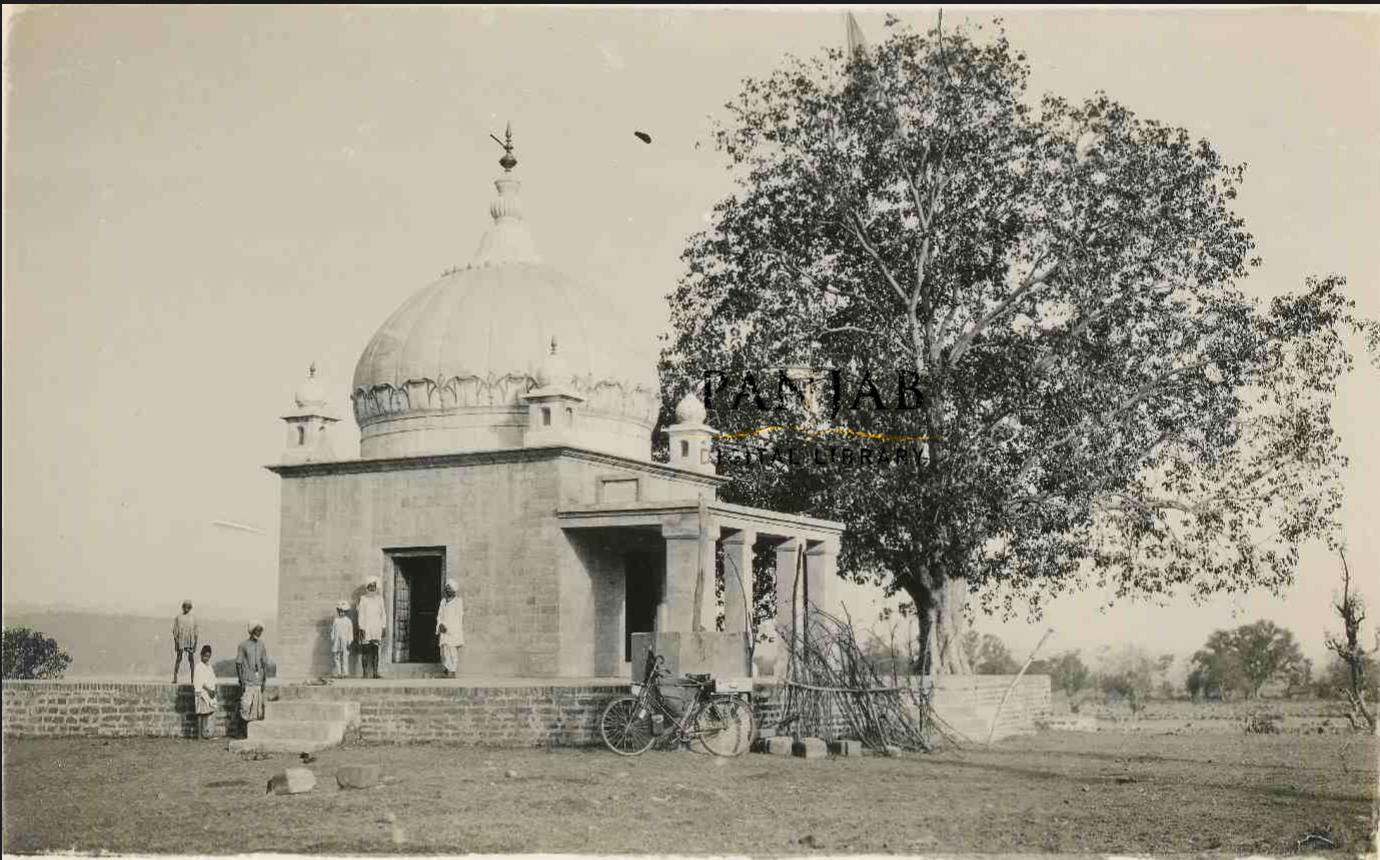
Photograph of Gurdwara Patshahi Dasvin in Nadaun, taken by Dhanna Singh Chahal 'Patialvi', 1933

Later, Maharaja Ranjit Singh built a gurdwara on the spot where the Guru had pitched his tent. The Gurdwara was affiliated to Shiromani Gurdwara Prabandhak Committee in 1935. It is known as Gurudwara Dasvin Patshahi or Gurdwara Nadaun Sahib.
