= Dadwal (surname) =

Family name

Dadwal, also written as Dadhwal and Dhadwal, is a surname prevalent in Punjab, Himachal Pradesh and Jammu. The surname is prevalent in the Rajput community. It is also prevalent in the Jatt community and is a clan name amongst Hindus and Sikhs.

== History ==
The origins of the Dadwal name are linked to the development of the royal houses of Guler, Siba and Datarpur which were hill states in present day Himachal Pradesh. Historically, the Dhadwal community is mentioned in the Ain-i-Akbari written in the 16th century during the Mughal period. The Dhadwals are listed as settled in the pargana known as Bahalwan (stone fort).

According to Brentnall (2004), Dadwals are Katoch Rajputs. Hutchison and Vogel (1933, 1994) state that the Dadwal clan takes its name from a place called Dada which was within Siba State. The stone fort at Dada is mentioned in the Ain-i-Akbari describing political units in 1595 A.D. The old state of Siba and the Dada state is now represented by Dadasiba which was a landholding created by the British. The village of Dadasiba is now in the Kangra district of Himachal Pradesh. The royal family of Datarpur came into existence after Hari Chand seceded from the kingdom of Kangra and established his own kingdom in Guler (1415). His descendant Sibarn Chand then seceded from Guler and established the kingdom of Siba and in turn, his younger son, Khammi Chand, had three sons, one of whom was Lakhuda Chand who lived at Dada and adopted the clan name Dadwal.

According to Ranken (1895), "the Dadwals are so called from Dada, a fort on the Beas, which was built by the founder of the clan when it seceded from Siba". Lakhuda Chand's grandson, Datar Chand established the Datarpur state in 1550 which is in now Hoshiarpur district. The fort of Tatarpur is mentioned in the Ain-i-Akbari. This may be a reference to the fort of Datarpur. A descendant of the princely family of Datarpur is Kunwar Deepak Singh who is a descendant of Raja Datarchand.

Another version of the history of Datarpur and the Dadwals is as follows: Sabarn Chand founded the state of Siba in the fifteenth century. The Siba state housed two forts, Siba fort and Dada fort. In the seventh generation from Sibarn Chand, the state of Siba was ruled by Manak Chand who had three sons: Narmudah Chand, Ram Chand and Lakhuda Chand. Lakhuda Chand had his residence at Dada. The grandson of Lakhuda Chand was Datar Chand who in 1600 A.D. established the state of Datarpur.

Yet another narrative states that Raja Makhwal Chand was a descendant of Phuman Chand. Raja Makhwal Chand settled in Dada and founded the Dadwal Sept. His descendant founded the state of Datarpur.

According to Rose (1919, 1990), however, the Dhadwals are also Jat who migrated from Hoshiarpur into Kapurthala district. Barstow (1928) reported that in the 1911 census of the Punjab, 515 people were returned as Dadwal Jat in Amritsar district. In modern times, the Oxford Dictionary of Family Names in Britain and Ireland (2016) also lists Dhadwal as a Jatt clan.

== Locations ==
The following is a list of places known as Dadwal:

- Dadwal Village - Una, Himachal Pradesh
- Dadwal village - kukanet Dholbaha, Hoshiarpur Punjab
- Dadwal village - Janauri, Hoshiarpur Punjab
- Dhadwal village - Siprian, Hoshiarpur, Punjab, India
- Dadwal village - Bilaspur, Himachal Pradesh.
- Dadwal village - Pathankot, Punjab, India.
- Dhadwal town - Narowal, Punjab, Pakistan.
- Dhadwal village - Dharamshala, Himachal Pradesh, India.
- Dadhwal Village - Depur, Hoshiarpur, Punjab India
- Dadwal Village - Fatehpur ( Near Garhdiwala ), Hoshiarpur, Punjab, India
- Dadwal Village - Bhanowal ( Near Garhdiwala ), Hoshiarpur, Punjab, India
- Dadwal village - Dalwali Khurd, Hoshiarpur, Punjab India
- Dadwal Village - Repur, Datarpur, Hoshiarpur, Punjab, India
- Dadwal Village - Dandoh, Hoshiarpur, Punjab, India
