= British rule in Himachal Pradesh =

The Indian Rebellion of 1857, also known as the First War of Indian Independence and the Sepoy Mutiny, was a prolonged period of armed uprisings in different parts of India, against British occupation of that part of the subcontinent.

The first Indian war of independence resulted due to the build-up of political, social, economic, religious and military grievance against the British. People of the hill provinces were not politically active as were the people in other states of the country. More or less they maintained distance and so did their rulers with the exception of Bushahr. Some of them even provided help to the British during the time of revolt. Among them were the rulers of Chamba, Bilaspur, Bhagal and Dhami. The sons of Raja Gobind Singh, ruler of Siba State, namely Raja Ram Singh and Raja Sunder Singh, revolted against the British and killed some of them along with their cousin. As a result, Sunder Singh left the throne and established an independent domain named Tantpalan. The rulers of Bushahr acted in a hostile manner to the interests of the British. However, the evidence is not clear whether they really aided the rebels or not. The British territories in the hills came under the direct control of the British Crown after Queen Victoria's proclamation of 1858. The provinces of Chamba, Mandi and Bilaspur made a good rate of progress in various fields during the British rule. During World War I, nearly all rulers of the hill states remained loyal and served in the British army during the war time. Amongst the states which helped the British were the states of Kangra, Dada-Siba Jagir, Nurpur, Chamba, Suket State, Mandi and Bilaspur.
