= Jat Sikh =

Ethnoreligious subgroup on the Indian subcontinent

ਜੱਟ ਸਿੱਖ

Total population
- 6–8 million (estimations)

Regions with significant populations
- India

Languages
- Punjabi and its dialects • Lahnda • Hindi • Urdu

Religion
- Sikhism

Related ethnic groups
- Jat people

Jat Sikh or Jatt Sikh (Punjabi: ਜੱਟ ਸਿੱਖ, pronounced [d͡ʒəʈːə̆ sɪkːʰə̆]) is an ethnoreligious group, a subgroup of the Jat people whose traditional religion is Sikhism, originating from the Indian subcontinent. They are one of the dominant communities in Punjab, India, owing to their large land holdings. They constitute a substantial proportion of the Sikh population.

== Etymology ==
The New Indo-Aryan term jaṭṭ descends from the Prakrit form jaṭṭa, itself from jarta, or jartika, the name of a tribe stated in antiquity as residing in Vahlika.

== History ==
=== Background ===
During the 15th–16th centuries, a period of regionalised, tribal spheres of influence existed in the Punjab, with the Kharals and Sials being influential in the lower sections of the Bari and Rechna doabs, with the Gakkhars, Awans, and Janjuas in the upper Sindh Sagar Doab, while Rajput clans were dominant along the Shivalik Hills and the regions adjoining Rajasthan. According to Jagtar Singh Grewal, Jatts from Rajasthan and Sindh started settling in the Punjab by following rivers upstream, displacing the Gujjar and Rajput tribes for agricultural lands. By the late 16th century, the Jatts were the most numerous agricultural caste between the Jhelum and Yamuna rivers. In Punjabi Hindu society, the Jatts occupied a low-status due to their refusal to engage in sati (widow immolation) and their practice of widow remarriage (chadar chadhana).

==== Mythological origin ====
The Jatts of Punjab claimed to originate from the locks of Shiva, known as jatas. Furthermore, they claimed Kshatriya status but explained their uptake of ploughing work as being due to a vow they made to Parashuram to forfeit the warrior-ways and adopt an agricultural lifestyle.

=== Adoption of Sikhism ===
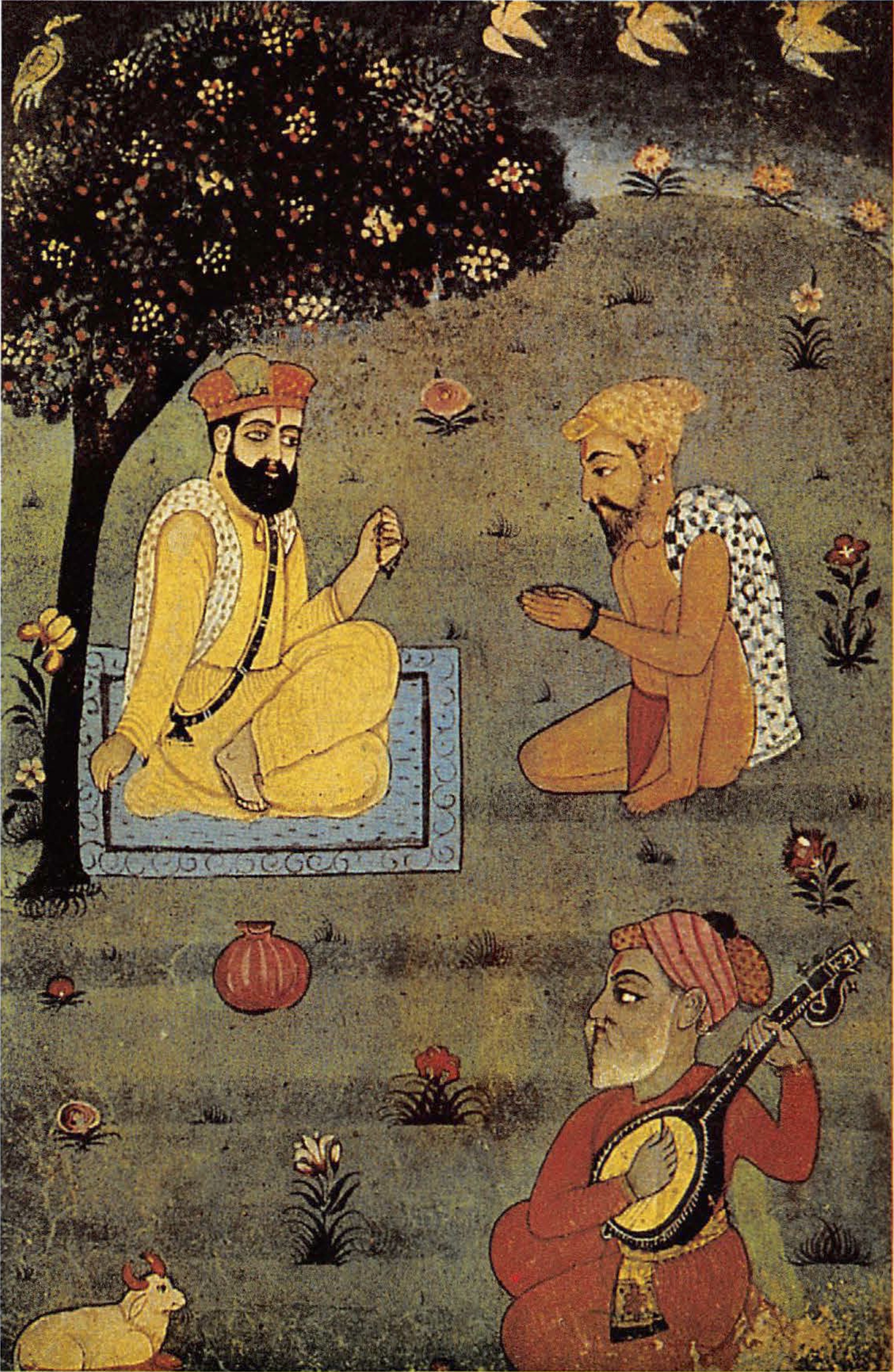
Guru Nanak (left) seated and in-discussion with Ajita Randhawa (right), an early Jat disciple of Sikhism. Mardana is in the foreground. Painting from the B-40 Janamsakhi and was painted in 1733 by Alam Chand Raj.

Initially, some Jats started to follow the teachings of Guru Nanak, which did much to remove social barriers created by the sāvarṇa caste society. Jats were previously indifferent towards deep religious affairs.

While followers important to Sikh tradition like Baba Buddha were among the earliest significant historical Sikh figures, and significant numbers of conversions occurred as early as the time of Guru Angad (1504–1552), the first large-scale conversions of Jats is commonly held to have begun during the time of Guru Arjan (1563–1606). While touring the countryside of eastern Punjab, he founded several important towns like Tarn Taran Sahib, Kartarpur, and Hargobindpur which functioned as social and economic hubs, and together with the community-funded completion of the Darbar Sahib to house the Guru Granth Sahib and serve as a rallying point and center for Sikh activity, established the beginnings of a self-contained Sikh community, which was especially swelled with the region's Jat peasantry. They formed the vanguard of Sikh resistance against the Mughal Empire from the 18th century onwards. While W. H. McLeod was of the position that Jats only began to convert in large numbers to Sikhism and influence the community by the time of Guru Amar Das and certainly by the time of Guru Arjan, Pashaura Singh and Louis E. Fenech on the other hand opine that large scale conversions of Jats into Sikhism came about during Guru Nanak's time settled down in Kartarpur and living an agricultural lifestyle.

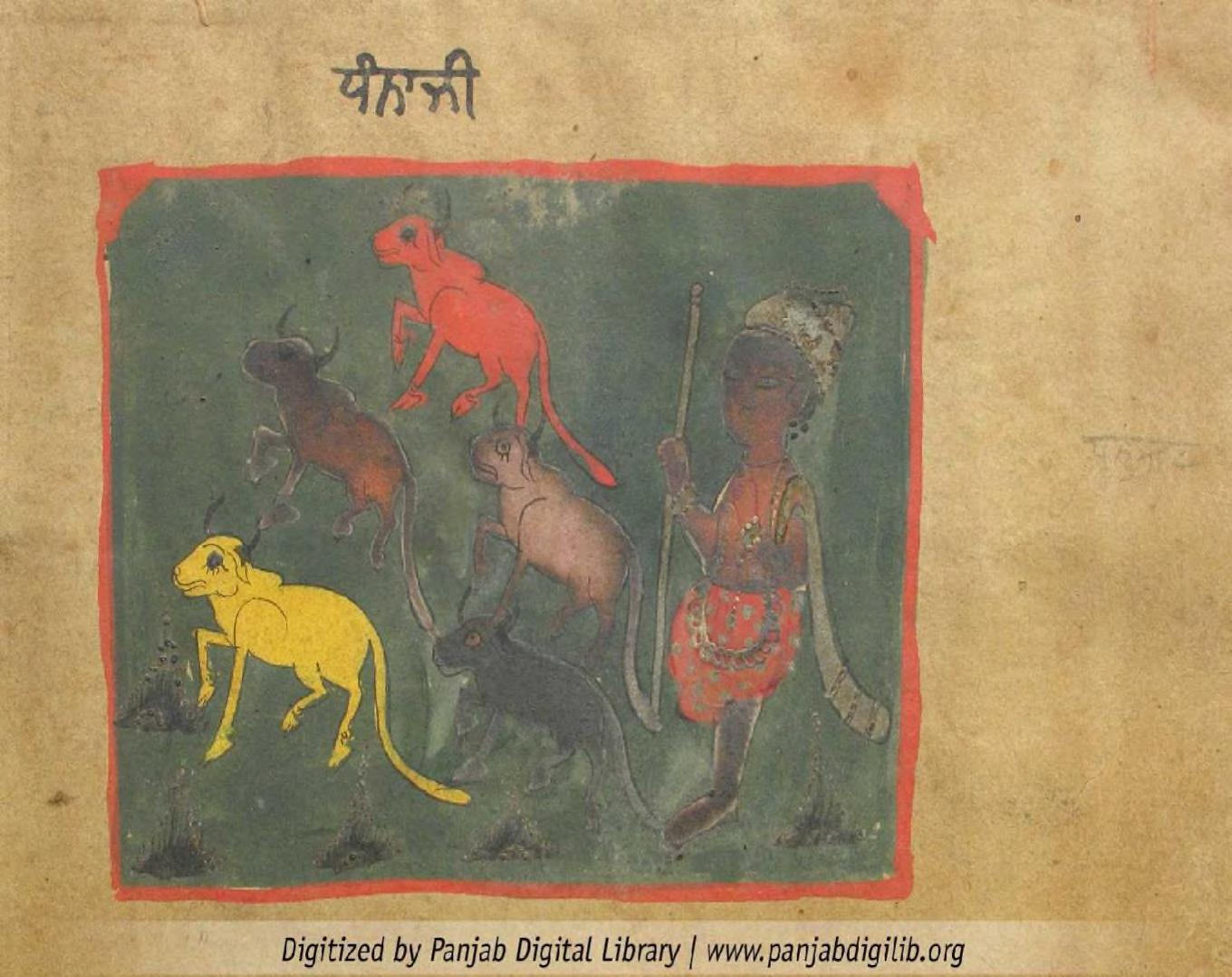
Painting of Bhagat Dhanna, from a folio within an illustrated manuscript of the Prem Ambodh Pothi

When Guru Arjan compiled the Adi Granth, three verses (in Asa and Dhanashree ragas) attributed to Bhagat Dhanna (born 1415), a Jat, were included in the scripture.

It has been postulated, though inconclusively, that the increased militarisation of the Sikh panth following the martyrdom of Guru Arjan (beginning during the era of Guru Hargobind and continuing after) and its large Jat presence may have reciprocally influenced each other.

Dharam Singh, one of the inaugural Panj Piare quintet, was a Jat. 18th century Sikh literature claims he was the reincarnation of Bhagat Dhanna.

=== Political ascendancy ===
The majority of Sikh rulers hailed from a Jat background. At least nine of the 12 Misls of the Sikh Confederacy were led by Jat Sikhs, who would form the vast majority of Sikh chiefs. Of the remaining three misls, the Ahluwalias were led by Kalals who claimed descent from Jats, the Ramgarhia Misl was founded by both Tarkhans and Jats, and the Dallewalia Misl was founded by both Khatris and Jats. According to W. H. McLeod, the Jat Sikhs dominated the Sikh Confederacy during the 18th century. The Jat states of the 18th century conducted marital alliances with one another, such as between the Sukerchakias and Jind.

Ranjit Singh, the founder of the Sikh Empire, was also of a Jat Sikh background. Ranjit Singh was of peasant origins but formed a unified Sikh state with a powerful military and efficient administration. Ranjit Singh formed a sovereign state despite his Jat Sikh background and conflict from fellow Sikh misls. By 1799, Ranjit Singh had conquered Lahore and much of Punjab, laying the groundwork for the empire. Many prominent families of the Sikh Empire's court, such as the Majithias and Sandhawalias, were also of Jat origin.

=== Colonial period ===
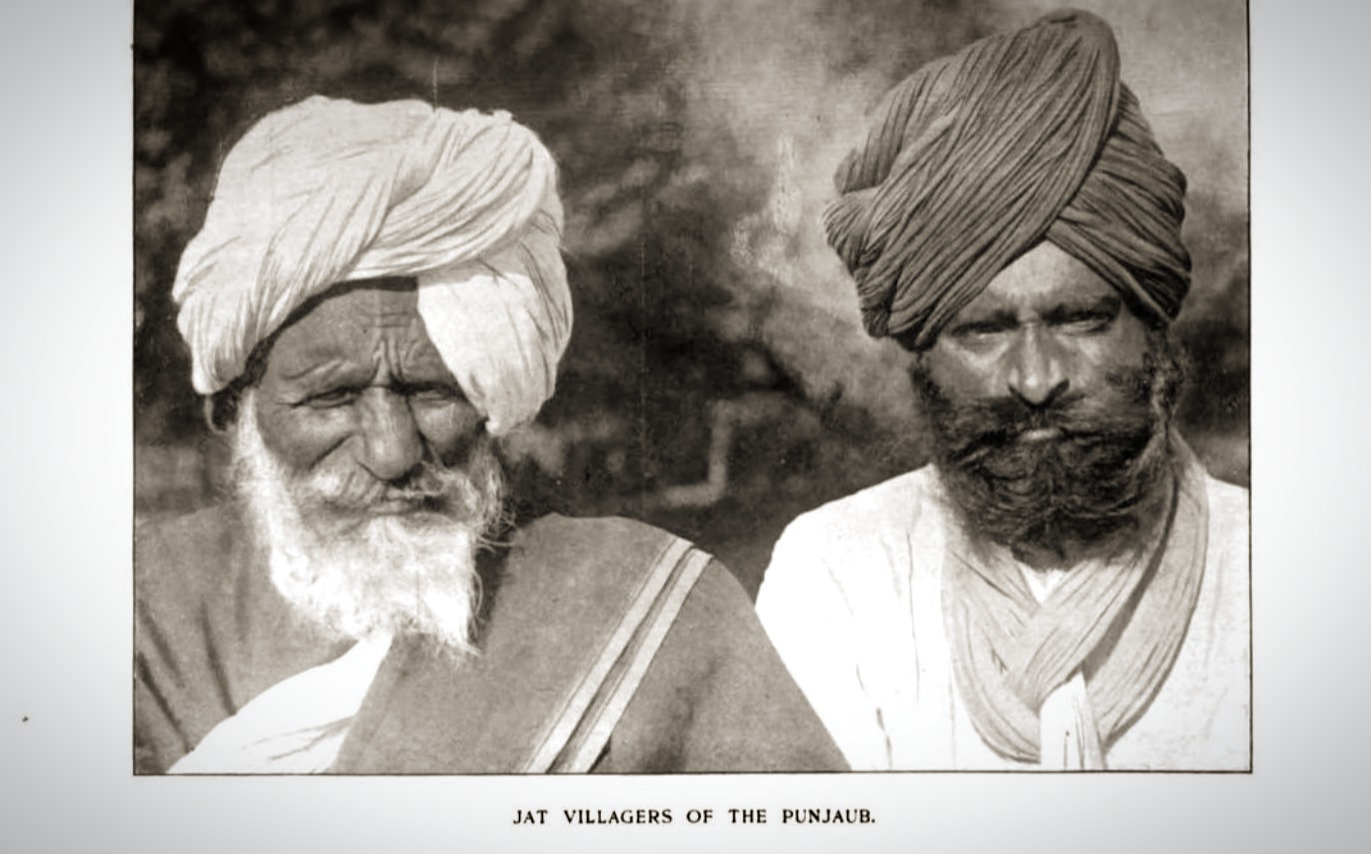
Photograph of Jat villagers of the Punjab, published in 'Village, Town, and Jungle Life in India' (1905)

According to censuses in gazetteers published during the colonial period in the early 20th century, further waves of Jat conversions, from Hinduism to Sikhism, continued during the preceding decades. The relationship between the Hindu, Muslim and Sikh communities of the Punjab region, and between communities such as the Jats and the Rajputs, has been ambiguous over many centuries. The various groups often claim similar origins while asserting their distinctiveness.

=== Post-independence ===
The Shiromani Akali Dal had two factions, one led by Sant Fateh Singh (supported by Jatts) and the other by Master Tara Singh (supported by Khatris). Since the late 1960s, many Jatt Sikh youths in India started trimming their beards and wearing the turban with shorn/unshorn hair (diasporic Jatt Sikhs in foreign countries also began not wearing turbans), where as Sikhs from other castes rarely do this. Jatt Sikhs and Mazhabi Sikhs are noted for the laxity in keeping an outward Sikh appearance, such as maintaining kesh and wearing a dastar, when compared to other Sikh castes. There is a notable divide between the Jatts and Khatris, whom the Jatts refer to with the bhapa pejorative. The Jatt Sikhs had caste-conflicts with scheduled-caste Sikh groups, resulting in the incident regarding the management of a gurdwara at Talhan (Jalandhar district) in 2003 and the assassination of the spiritual leader of Dera Sachkhand Balla in 2009.

== Influence of Sikhism on Jats ==
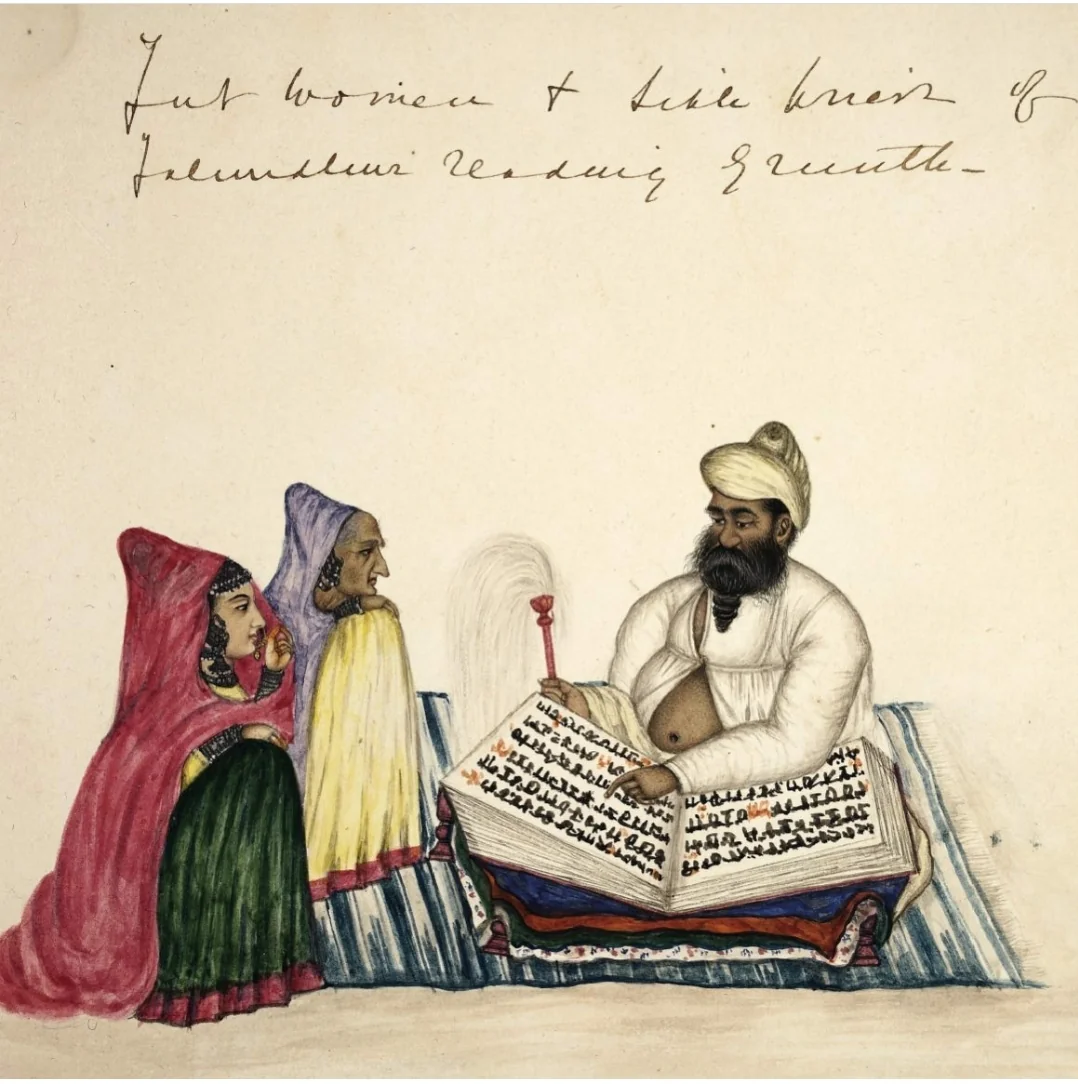
"Jut women & Sikh priest of Jalundhur reading Grunth" (Guru Granth Sahib), circa 1860 painting.

Irfan Habib has argued that Sikhism did much to uplift the social status of Jat people, who were previously regarded in the Punjab as being of shudra or vaishya status in the Hindu ritual ranking system of varṇa.

Kishan Singh says:

A serious contradiction afflicts the Jat farmer of the Punjab. He has unflinching faith in Guru Gobind Singh, yet at the same time he is imbued with traits typical of a Jat. There are two sides to the Jat's known traits. One has a positive effect in the sense that it saves him from feeling inferior; and the other side is negative. It makes him overbearing and arrogant which is a disease. A Jat's negative traits can be suppressed only through the true spirit of Sikhism.

== Army recruits ==
The Jat Sikh community has constituted an important source of recruits for the Indian Army. Many serve in the Indian Army, including the Jat Regiment, Sikh Regiment, Rajputana Rifles and The Grenadiers, where they have won many of the highest military awards for gallantry and bravery.

== Agriculture ==
In Punjab (India), Jat Sikhs are associated with agricultural pursuits and land ownership. They own more than 80%, and possibly as much as 95% of available agricultural land in Punjab. They often reside in the rural areas, and are economically influential in the state. A unique quirk among Jat Sikh clans is the agricultural practice of not allowing Jat Sikh women to work in the fields.

== Clans ==
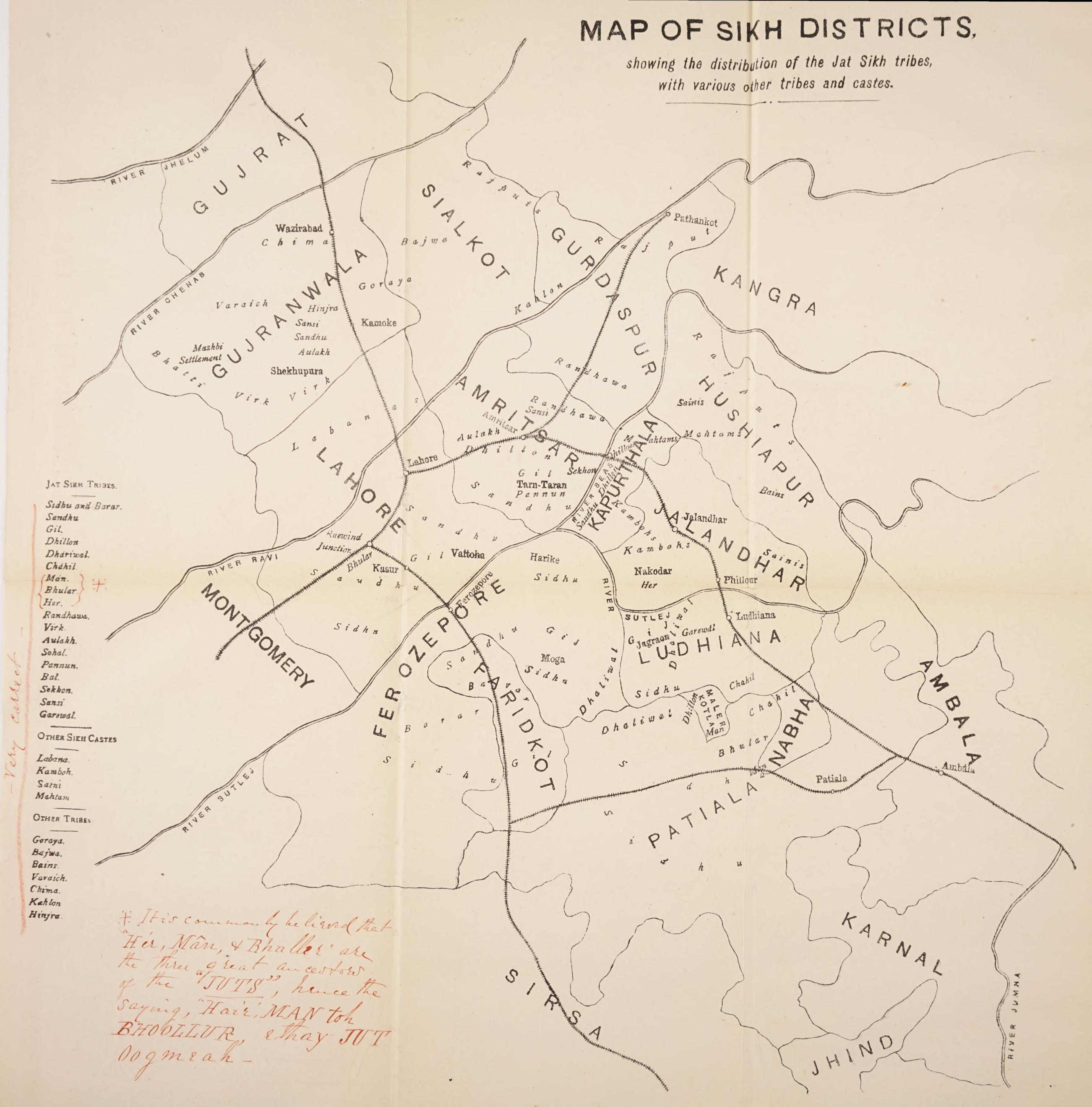
Map of Sikh Districts, Showing the Distribution of Jat Sikh Tribes, With Various Other Tribes and Castes (1896) by Robert Worgan Falcon

Jat Sikhs have various clans, known as a got (clan or sub-caste; gotra in Hindi), which come under a particular zaat (tribe or caste; jati in Hindi), in Punjabi. These clans generally claim descent from a common male ancestor, are usually exogamous (with some exceptions), (Note: The Grewal clan is noted for marrying among themselves.) and historically entire villages, and even clusters of villages, were often inhabited by entirely by a single clan. The purpose for this was to provide protection for members of a clan by watching over each-other and uniting as a common group against any potential adversary. Another reason is that members of a clan socially preferred their neighbours to also be from the same background as them. However, modern Jat Sikhs no longer feel affinity to others just because they share the same clan, as clan solidarity has died-out as a practice. Some Jat Sikh clans overlap with Hindu and Muslim Jat clans and clans may also be shared with other caste groups, such as Rajputs. Clans can be further subdivided by muhin (sub-clan or locality) and patti (residential sub-unit). However, the practice of recognising and being cognizant of smaller sub-divisions of a got (clan) has since died-out in the present-age and is no longer commonly practised among Jat Sikhs. The only practical function of Jat Clans in this present-day are for the purposes of selecting a marriage partner.

According to Joyce Pettigrew, the Jat Sikh clans traditionally claim patrilineal descent from a Rajput ancestor and purport to have settled in the Punjab in the 16th century. While Jat Sikhs as a whole marry endogamously within the Jat community, they marry exogamously based upon got (clan), meaning they marry other Jats belonging to a different clan. Furthermore, there is no established hierarchy of clans, even though the various clans are typically uneven in-size. Jat clans cannot also be linked to specific regions, as adjacent villages are often inhabited by different clans. Thus, the clan cannot be described as "localized kinship groupings". The "ranking" of a particular clan was evaluated in a specific category, not in a general sense. An example given by Pettigrew is the Grewal clan being renowned for having many of its members in military and administrative roles. While the Sidhus were prominent in the Malwa region of the Punjab, with many ruling families of the cis-Sutlej states, such as Patiala State, belonging to this clan, and the ruling house of Attari in Majha also being Sidhus. The fact that many Sidhus were ruling polities increased the prestige of the clan in the eyes of their fellow Sikhs. Furthermore, there exists idiomatic phrases which propound upon the supposed superiority of one clan over another, an example being: Sandhu, Sidhu, ik baraabar, Gills tore uchera (meaning "Sandhus and Sidhus are equal but Gills are a bit superior to both"). Another tradition regards the Mann, Chahal, and Bhullar clans as being asal Jats ("genuine Jats") since the rest of the clans were supposedly "degraded Rajputs". According to Pettigrew, groups such as the Mazhabi have adopted Jat Sikh clan names in an attempt to seek higher social-status by affiliating themselves to Jats, a unique practice.

Iftikhar Ahmed observes that the Jat clans of zamindars recorded in the late-16th century Ain-i-Akbari correspond to the population of the clans in particular tracts of the country, when compared with British census data recorded centuries later in the 19th century. Zamindars coming from particular clans tended to hold power in areas where the population of peasants from their same clan was high. By the time of the recording of the Ain-i-Akbari in circa 1595, around thirty-two per cent of the total parganas were under Jat zamindars, making them the largest zamindar caste. Ahmed came to these findings after researching the Chima, Chatta, Ghumman, Bajwa, and Kahlon clans in the foothills west of Lahore (western submontane), the Langah, Kharral, and Marral clans located in the western plains west of Lahore but excluding the Salt Range and submontane tracts, and the Sidhu, Sindhu, and Bhular clans in the "Sikh Tract" (central district of the Punjab, the upper Sutlej, and the Sikh states to the east).

=== List of common Jat Sikh clans ===
- Aulakh
- Bains
- Bajwa
- Bal
- Bhalli
- Bharai
- Bhullar
- Brar
- Buttar
- Chahal
- Chattha
- Cheema
- Deol
- Dhadwal
- Dhaliwal
- Dhillon
- Dhindsa
- Dhingra
- Gandhi
- Gill
- Grewal
- Ghuman
- Hundal
- Her
- Kahlon
- Kang
- Karg
- Kars
- Khaira
- Maan
- Margat
- Mahal
- Mangat
- Odi
- Pannu
- Pavun
- Punia
- Randhawa
- Saharia
- Sahi
- Sandhu
- Sara
- Sarai
- Sahota
- Sidhu
- Sodhi
- Sohal
- Toor
- Uppal
- Virk
- Virla
- Warraich

== Demographics ==
Jat Sikhs form an estimated 20–25% of the population of the Indian state of Punjab. They form at least half of the Sikh population in Punjab, with some sources estimating them to be about 60–66% of the Sikh population. Surinder Jodhka (2024) estimated they make-up around 33% of the Sikh population.

== Notable people ==
- Baba Buddha, first granthi (custodian and reader) of the Guru Granth Sahib
- Ranjit Singh, the Jat Sikh Emperor of the Sikh Empire
- Bhai Bala, follower and companion of Guru Nanak (first Guru of Sikhism) and one of the most revered in Sikhism
- Nawab Kapur Singh, leader of Singhpuria Misl.
- Baba Deep Singh first head of Misl Shaheedan Tarna Dal.
- Kahn Singh Nabha, Sikh scholar
- Heera Singh Sandhu, founder of Nakai Misl
- Sada Kaur, chief of the Kanhaiya Misl
- Datar Kaur, queen consort of Maharaja Ranjit Singh
- Jind Kaur, regent of the Sikh Empire
- Bhupinder Singh, Maharaja of the princely state of Patiala in British India from 1900 to 1938
- Rajinder Singh, Maharaja of the princely state of Patiala in British India from 1876 to 1900
  - M. S. Gill, Indian Administrative Service officer who served as the Mnister of Sports and Youth Affairs and the Minister of Statistics and Programme Implementation.
- Diljit Dosanjh, Indian singer, actor and film producer
- Sidhu Moose Wala, Indian singer and rapper

== See also ==
- List of Jats
- Khalsa
