= Bhour =

- village
- Interactive map of Bhour
- Coordinates: 31°14′01.74″N 75°16′11.13″E
- Country: India
- State: Punjab
- District: Kapurthala

Population
  - Total: 5,000

Languages
  - Official: Punjabi
- Time zone: UTC+5:30 (IST)
- PIN: 144626
- Telephone code: 1828
- Vehicle registration: PB-41
- Nearest city: Sultanpur lodhi

Bhour is a village in the Punjab state of India, located near the city of Sultanpur Lodhi, in the Kapurthala district. The population consists of members of different castes, with a majority of Jatt Sikh members, and a minority population of Muslims. The village has a Gurudwara and a Mosque (Lakha Wala Datta). There is a stadium on the north side, and a unisex school on the south side of the village which holds classes for 1st-5th standard years of education. The population consists of many expats living in Dubai, Canada, United States and Europe. The village has undergone a huge Infrastructural development with almost all houses been built modern when compared to neighboring villages. The village hosts a Tournament "Shaeed Bhagat Singh Tournament" in memorial of Bhagat Singh, every year with help of all the village members and NRI people. People having roots from this village are very hardworking.
