= Bhim Chand (Kahlur) =

Raja of Bilaspur from 1665 to 1692

- Raja
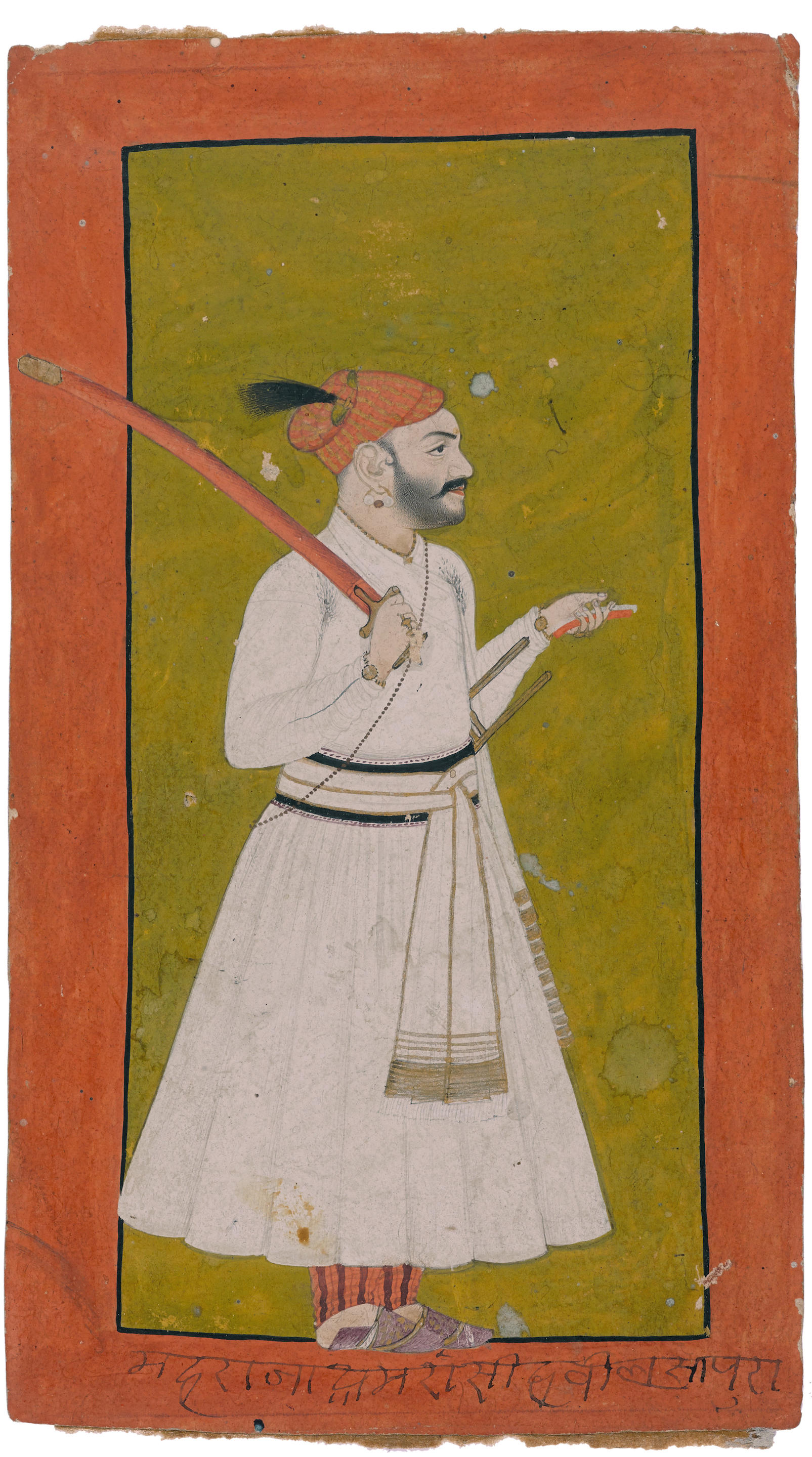
- Miniature painting of Maharaja Bhim Chand of Bilaspur State, Bilaspur (Basohli), circa 1680

Raja of Bilaspur
- Reign: 1665 – 16 September 1692
- Predecessor: Dip Chand
- Successor: Ajmer Chand
- Born: c. 1651; Bilaspur, Himachal Pradesh
- Died: c. 16 September 1692 (Note: Other sources state 1712 and before 1701)
- Son: Ajmer Chand
- House: Haihaya, Lunar dynasty
- Father: Dip Chand
- Mother: Rani Jalal Devi
- Religion: Vaishnavite Hinduism

Bhim Chand (born 1651) was the Rajput ruler of Kahlur (reigned 1665 – 1692) and Anandpur Sahib fell under his territorial area. He launched his first expedition against Guru Gobind Singh in 1682. In 1688 he conflicted with the armies of Guru Gobind Singh and his disciples in Battle of Bhangani. In 1691, Bhim Chand fought in the Battle of Nadaun against Mughals and came out victorious.

== Biography ==
Bhim Chand's family claimed descent from Chandel Rajputs of the Bundelkhand region. Prior to his accession to the throne of Bilaspur state (alternatively known as Kahlur state), there had been friendly ties between the polity and the Sikh gurus. Bhim Chand succeeded to the gaddi (throne) of Bilaspur on 27 April 1665. Hostilities between Kahlur and the Sikhs under the leadership of Guru Gobind Singh has been attributed to Bhim Chand feeling jealous over the growing influence of the Sikh guru and the regal mannerisms he practiced. Reasons for animosity has also been traced to Guru Gobind Singh rejecting Bhim Chand's request for his soldiers and others to pass through Paonta and only allowing the bridegroom and immediate members of the royal family to pass through, as part of a wedding procession of his son, the crown-prince Ajmer Chand, whom was betrothed to marry the daughter of Raja Fateh Shah of Garhwal state. The ruler of Kahlur took this rejection as a grave insult. This tension erupted in the Battle of Bhangani, in-which the alliance of Hill Rajas of Bilaspur, Garhwal, Kangra, amid others, were defeated. Later on, there was a rekindling of amiable ties between Bhim Chand and the Sikhs, ensuing with Guru Gobind Singh assisting the raja in the Battle of Nadaun against the Mughal forces led by Alif Khan, whom was sent to extract unpaid tribute from the Hill States to replenish the depleted Mughal treasury.

== Death ==
Various sources give different dates for his death. According to the Sikh literary work, Guru kian Sakhian (Note: Written by Bhatt Sarup Singh Kaushish of Bhadson and completed in 1790 CE.), he died on 16 September 1692. Another source states he abdicated the throne to his son in 1692 to become a fakir, dying before 1701. According to historical records of Kahlur, modern scholars, including J. S. Grewal, place his death in 1712. He was succeeded by his son, Ajmer Chand, as ruler of Bilaspur.
