= Kangri =

Kangri can mean:

- of, from, or related to the Kangra Valley or the Kangra district of Himachal Pradesh, India
  - Kangri language, the Indo-Aryan language spoken the valley
- Kanjari language, an Indo-Aryan language of the Kanjar people of India and Pakistan
- Kanger, or kangri, a pot filled with hot embers used by Kashmiris beneath their clothing to keep warm
- Kàngrì, in Chinese, means "resisting Japanese imperialism"

== See also ==
- Kangra (disambiguation)
