= Patti (subdivision) =

Traditional residential sub-division or unit found in settlements of Punjab

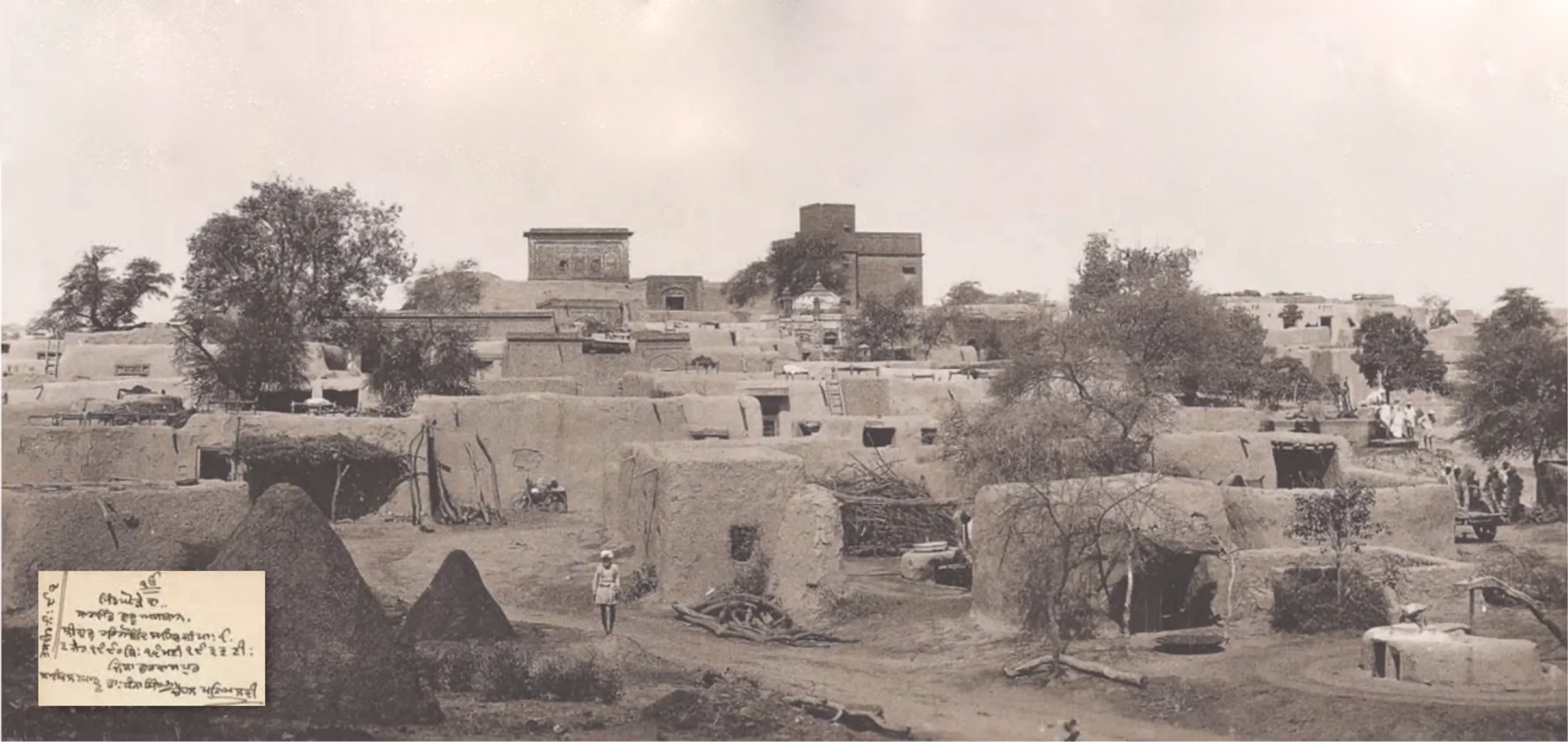
Photograph of Ghorewaha village in Gurdaspur district, taken by Dhanna Singh Chahal 'Patialvi', 15 May 1933

A patti or puttee is a traditional residential sub-division or unit found in settlements of Punjab. Historically, they tended to be inhabited by a particular social-group, whose names they often derive their own name from. The pattis consisted of agnates who held ancestrally inherited rights to a particular land-holding. The holder of a patti is known as a pattidar. It can be further divided into tholas.

== Description ==
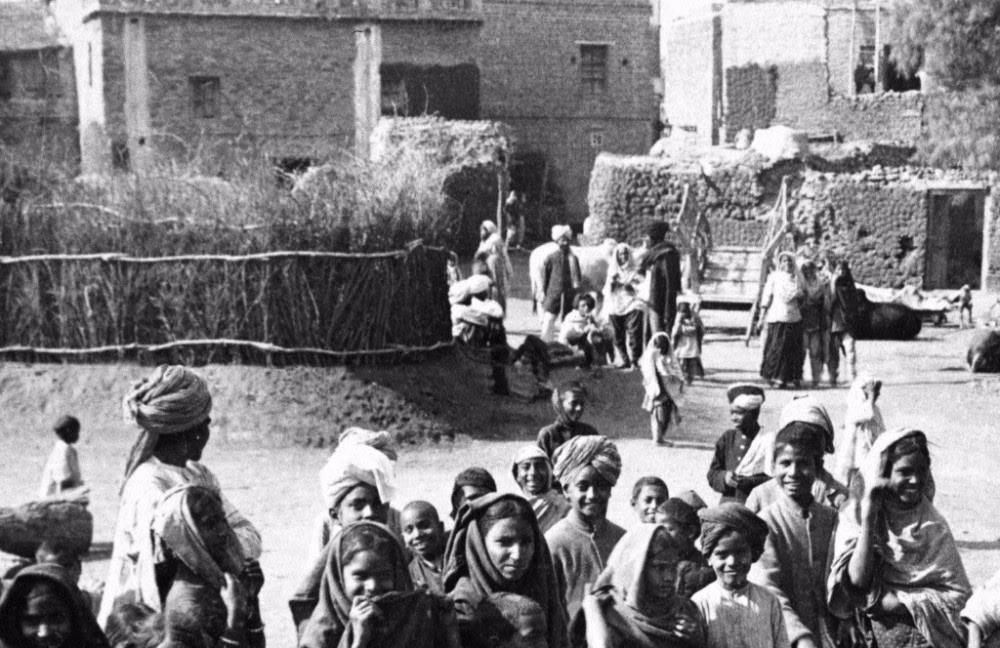
Village of Mozang near Lahore, 1912

Punjabi villages, known as pinds, which function as social-units, can be traditionally divided in different ways. One method is to divide them into pattis, which are further divided into tholas/thulas or als. A patti can be described as being a residential sub-classification of a village unit, which usually exists as a group of houses (often clustered together in a group and demarcated roughly from others) around a street, with the street being known as a gali or bihi. Richard Saumarez Smith describes it as being the principal subdivision of a village, which can be further subdivided into tholas. The common holding of a village or of a patti was known as a shamilat. Pattidaris were divided tenures or estates based upon ancestral holdings/shares, in-contrast to the Zamindari system, which is undivided tenure. The bhaiachara system was another manner of dividing a pattidari (divided) estate for land tenure shares which were not ancestral.

A patti is commonly named after the clan or lineage of the founder or the predominant group that inhabit them. Another naming method is based on actual or perceived characteristics of its inhabitants. The sub-division of a patti, known as a thula, are named after minimal lineages. Small, compact pattis may have no further subdivisions. Whilst a thula is a localized descent unit, an al is a descent unit which may not be localized and can be found dispersed in different pattis or even villages. Various service-orientated castes inhabit different pattis, alongside the dominant Jats, Rajputs, and other castes. Pattis are also known as gali-mohalas. In larger villages, a single patti may have its own panchayat.

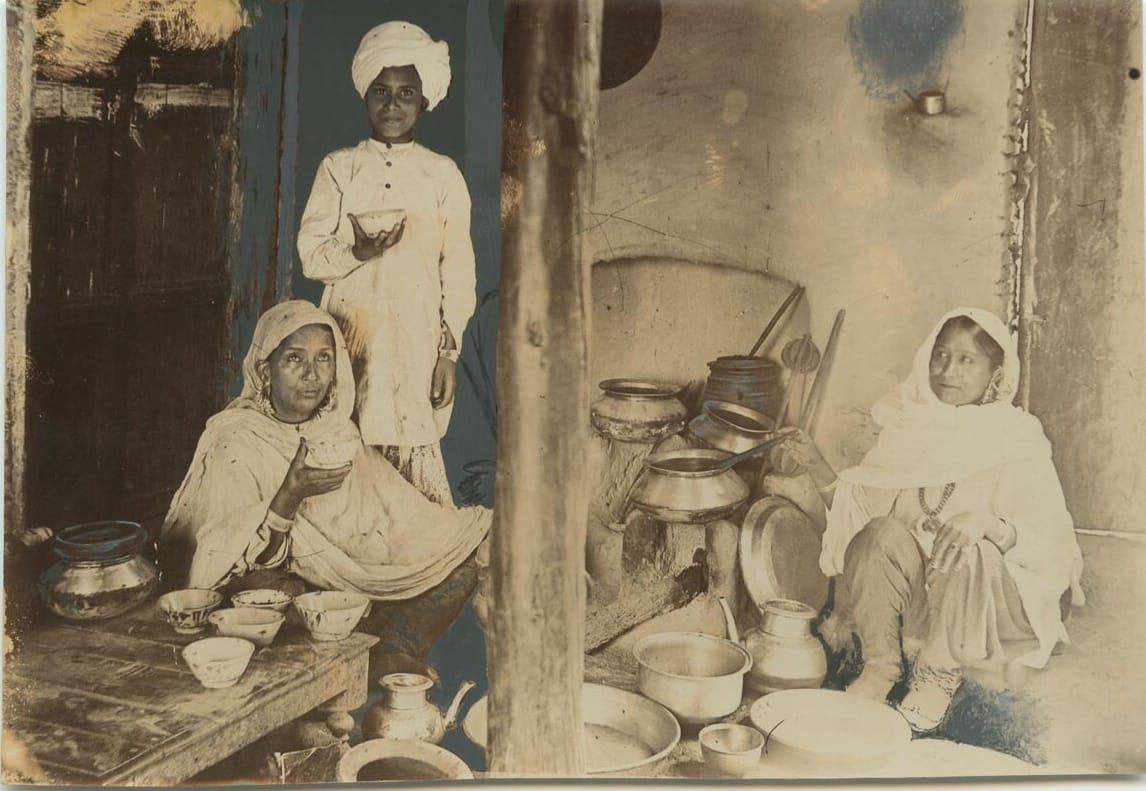
Photograph of a Punjabi house, Punjab, British India, ca.1901

Pattis can also be divided into gwand, which usually consists of five-to-ten housing units which are adjacent to one another. Neighbours of a gwand are known as gwandies, and may belong to differing caste-backgrounds. The housing unit is known as a ghar, with Punjabi houses traditionally being further subdivided into three components: dlan (main-room), rasoi or chula chaunka (kitchen), and vchra (yard). Another method of dividing the house-unit is: andrla (kitchen, bedroom, store) and bahrla (farm, animals, fodder, ) ghar, which separates the domestic domain of women from the external one. H. S. Bhatti believes the andrla and bahrla ghar division method is a later development.

== Vehra ==
A second method of dividing a village is by divvying it up by vehra (also known in some areas as agwar) or yards, which function as local-units but in some cases may be formed from a single-descent unit. This method is tied with lower castes, as the yard that low-caste groups, such as Chamars, inhabit are known as chamahri, which is isolated from the other yards inhabited by other groups of the village. In some villages, the service-orientated castes have their own vehra, which may be known as Naeean da vehra (barber-caste yard) or Ghumaran da vehra (potter-caste yard). These habitational divisions interact with social groupings, lineages, and clans, such as kul/kandan, sharika/bhaichar, moohi (sub-clan), got (clan), and jaat (caste).

== History ==
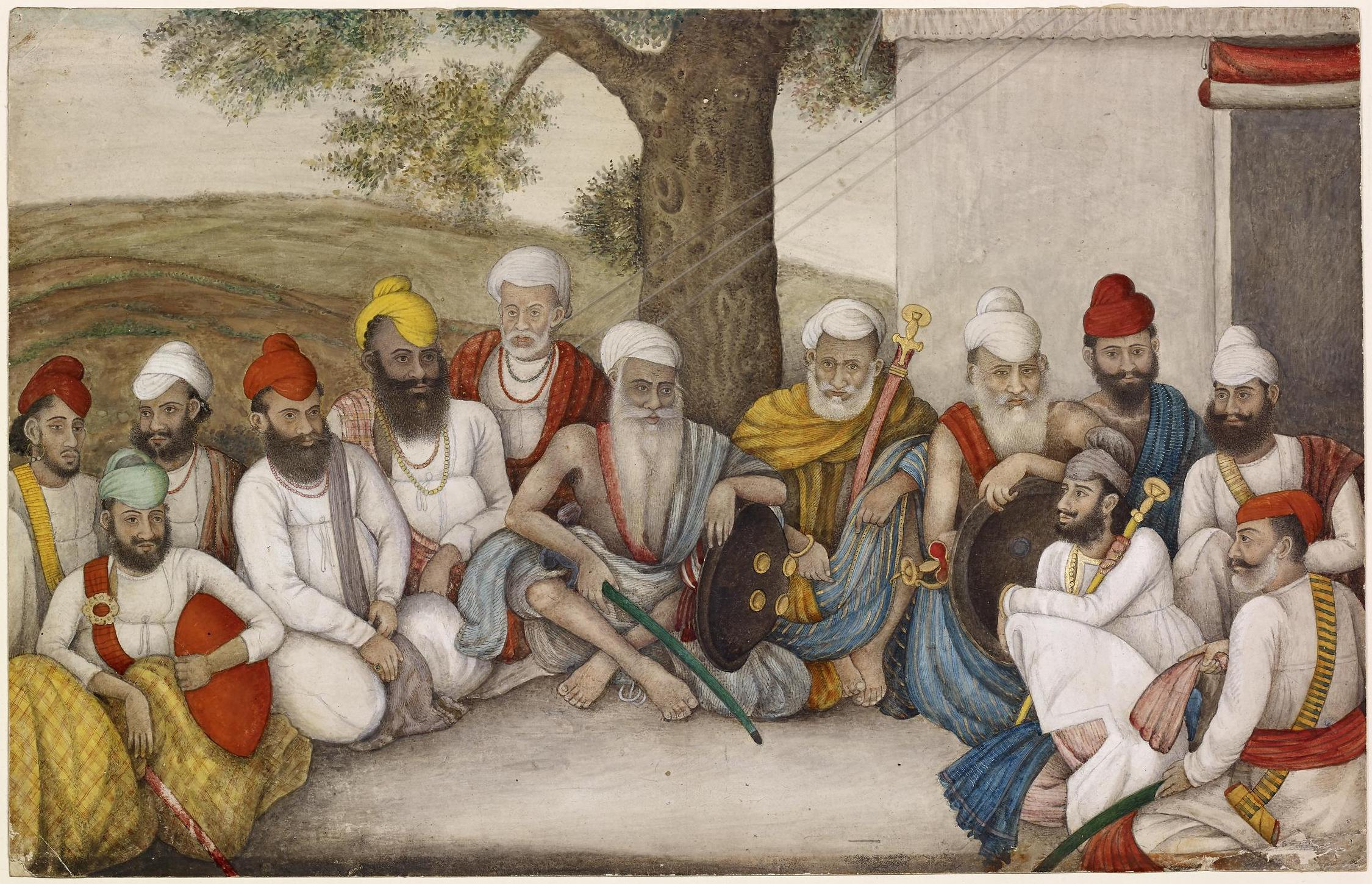
Painting of a party of Sikhs, Company School, ca.1817

The concept of patti originated from a need to define a share of ancestral land, with the holdings being classified into various pattis, also known as a panna (lot), whose number varied based upon the number of claimants or descendants. They were usually established by the original settlers of the village, often Jats. Later-on during British-rule, the concept was transformed into a classification category for village types.

== Punjabi units of locality ==
The units of locality in Punjab, after region and sub-region, are as follows from maximal outer boundaries to minimal central units:

- Ilaka (area): an ambiguous term that refers to an area of relatively close, demarcated cluster of villages or habitations dominated by a particular social-group or a common caste/clan. Symbolically represented by the term baran koh, which refers to a radius of twelve miles, that traditionally could be covered by foot in one-day's travel.
- Banna-channa (boundary): a group of five or six adjacent villages within an ilaka.
- Pind (village): the most important unit of locality. Consists of a boundary-line (banna) around its territory and a pathway that encircles the village, known as phirni. Other features are the darwaja (common-gate) and sath (common gathering-place).
- Patti (subdivision of a village)
- Thola (division of a patti)
- Gwand (five-to-ten adjacent houses)
- Ghar (house)
