= Kangra =

Kangra may refer to:

- Kangra State, an 11th to 19th-century historical state in present-day Himachal Pradesh, India
  - Kangra Fort, near the city of Kangra, Himachal Pradesh
- Kangra district, a district of Himachal Pradesh
  - Kangra, Himachal Pradesh, a city and municipal council in Kangra district
  - Kangra Lok Sabha constituency
  - Kangra Valley
  - Kangra painting, a style originating in Kangra district
- Kangra, Charsadda, a town in Pakistan

== See also ==
- Kangri (disambiguation)
