= Jaswan =

Precolonial Indian chieftaincy

Coordinates: 30.484°N 76.594°E

Jaswan chieftaincy
- Former subdivision of British India
- 1170 CE–1849 CE
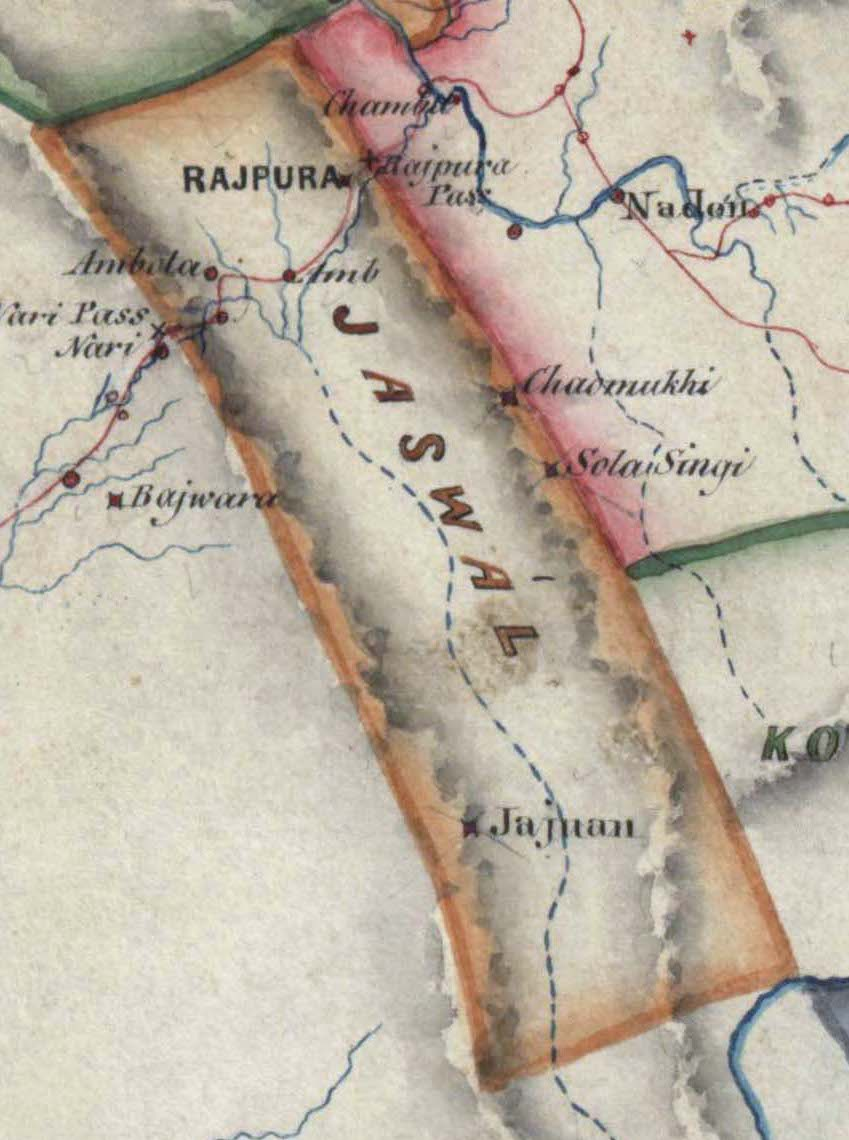
- Detail of Jaswan (Jaswal) from a map of the various Hill States of the Punjab Hills region, copied in 1852
- Capital: Rajpura
- History
  - Foundation of the chieftaincy: 1170 CE
  - Annexation by the Sikh Empire: 1849 CE
Preceded by	Succeeded by
Kangra State	Sikh Empire
- Today part of: Una, Himachal Pradesh, India

Jaswan was a chieftaincy in modern-day Himachal Pradesh, India, commanded by the Jaswal Rajput clan. It was founded in 1170 AD by Raja Purab Chand, a cadet of the Katoch lineage, ancient royal family of Kangra. Its capital was Rajpura.

== Location and geography ==
Jaswan was a narrow chieftaincy that was approximately 64.3 km (40 mi) long and 8 km (5 mi) wide. To the south and west directions, the chieftaincy bordered the Punjab Plains region and Shivalik Hills range. To the north, the chieftaincy bordered Siba State and Datarpur State. To the east, the state bordered Kangra State, Kutlehr State, and Bilaspur (Kahlur) State.

== History ==
=== Early history ===
According to legend Jaswan State was founded in 1170 CE by Raja Purab Chand from the Kangra royal family. The founder was from a junior branch of the Kangra royal family. Thus, the Jaswan rulers shared familial relations with the royal families of Kangra, Guler, Siba, and Datarpur states.

=== Mughal period ===
During the reign of Raja Govind Chand (r. c.1550-1575), the Jaswan ruler acted as a guardian for the minor Bidhi Chand of Kangra State. Also during Govind's reign in 1572, the state successfully defeated a Mughal invasion force attacking Kangra Fort. The state under Anirudh Chand (r. c.1580–c.1600) took part in Pahari rebellions against Mughal emperor Akbar in 1588 and 1594. However, both rebellions failed which led to the state submitting to Mughal authority, with the state finding specific mention in the Akbarnama.

In 1745, Raja Ajit Singh of Jaswan submitted to the Mughal governor of Lahore province, Adina Beg Khan. Raja Ajit Singh died without issue, thus he was succeeded by his brother Jaghar Singh. Jaghar Singh's successor, Abhiraj Singh, died without issue so he was succeeded by Jaghar's other son, Jagrup Singh.

=== Tributary under Kangra State ===
During the reign of Raja Umed Singh, Jaswan became a tributary of Kangra State under Raja Sansar Chand in 1786. However, later during Umed's reign in 1805, he joined forces with other hill states against Kangra State.

=== Sikh Empire and British Raj ===
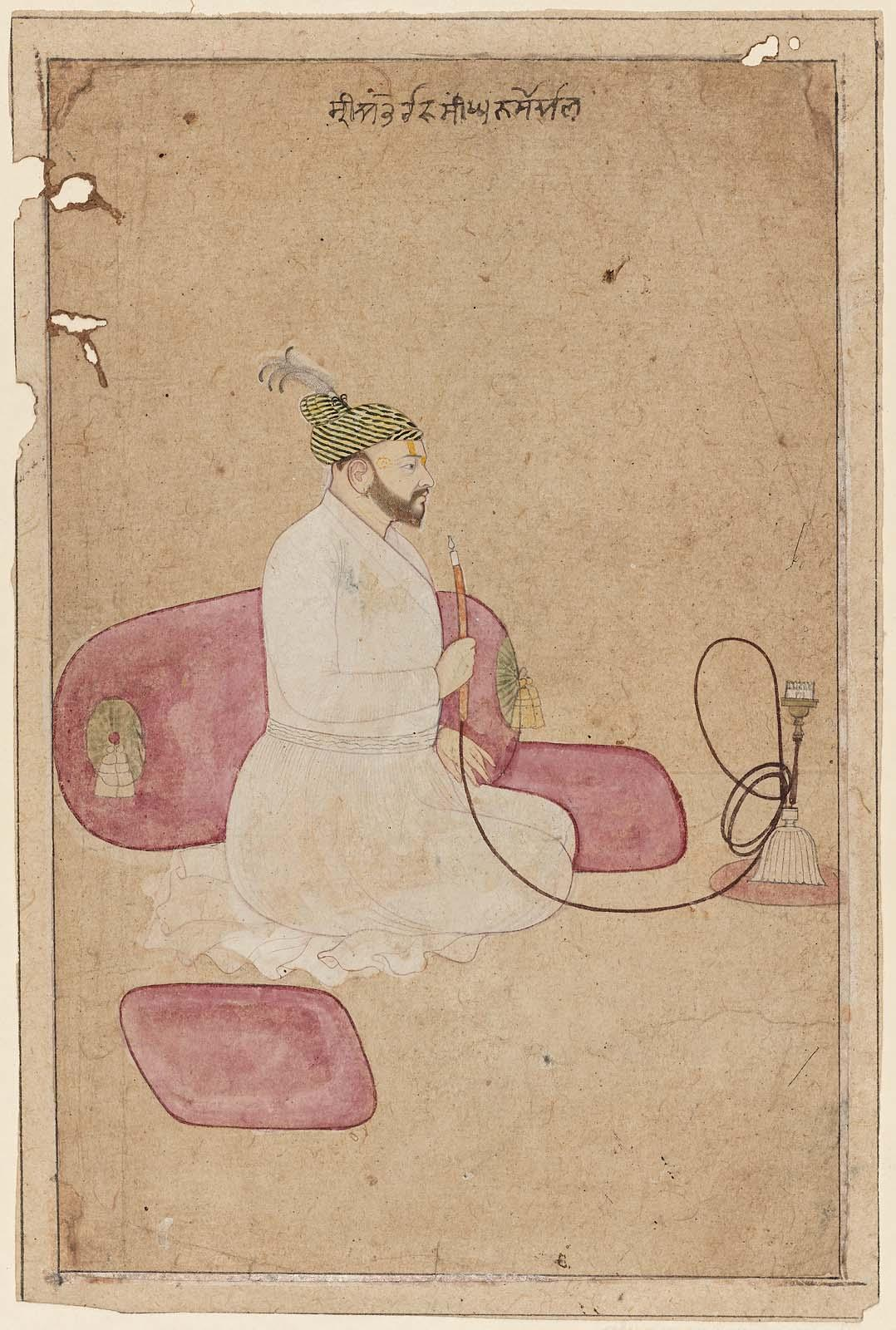
Painting of Raja Abhiraj Singh of Jaswan State, attributed to the Nainsukh familial atelier, circa 19th century

In 1809, Jaswan became a tributary of the Sikhs. In 1815, the Sikh Empire annexed Jaswan State and Umed Singh was reduced to a jagir. This is because Maharaja Ranjit Singh ordered all his available forces to assemble at Sialkot. The raja of Jaswan, Ummed Singh (1800–1849), failed to obey the summons and was fined a sum beyond his means. The raja was forced to relinquish his state to the Sikh emperor, and accepted a jagir of 21 villages and 12,000 Rs per annum. In 1848, he joined the Sikh in an unsuccessful revolt against the British during the Second Anglo-Sikh War. His palaces were plundered and razed to the ground, and his territory annexed in 1849. He was stripped of his title and exiled to Almora, where he died a year later in 1854. Umed's son, Jai Singh, was also deported alongside his father and thus died in-exile as well.

In 1877, the jagir in Jaswan, along with several other former properties in Rajpura and Amb, was restored to Ummed's grandson Ran Singh (b. 1833), who also later acquired the jagir of Ramkot in Jammu upon Ran's son's marriage to a granddaughter of Maharaja Ranbir Singh of J&K State. Upon his son's marriage to Ranbir Singh's granddaughter, Ran Singh was granted a jagir at Mankot in Jammu.

The titles claimed by the princes, however, were still denied any recognition until Raghunath Singh (b. 1852) was granted the title of raja due to his Katoch lineage and marriages to two of the daughters of Maharaja Ranbir Singh of Jammu and Kashmir. The title could not be passed on through inheritance, and he could not administer his jagir. Raghunath Singh died in 1918, after which Lachman Singh succeeded him.

== Rulers ==
The clan of the rulers of Jaswan was Jaswal. The rulers originally appended Chand to their name but later would append Singh.

=== List of rulers ===
List of rulers of Jaswan State
Name	Portrait	Reign	References
Rajas:
Purab Chand		1170 – ?	
Unknown intermediary rulers
Govind Chand		c.1550–1575	
Bikram Chand		c.1575–c.1580	
Anirudh Chand		c.1580–c.1600	
Samir Chand		c.1600–c.1630	
Man Singh		c.1630–c.1660	
Ajab Singh		c.1660–c.1690	
Ram Singh		c.1690–c.1720	
Ajit Singh		c.1720–c.1750	
Jaghar Singh		c.1750–c.1765	
Abhiraj Singh (Note: Also known as 'Abhirai Singh'.)		c.1765–c.1770	
Jagrup Singh		c.1770–1774	
Prit Singh (Note: Alias for Narpat Singh.)		1774–1782	
Umed Singh (Note: Also spelt as 'Ummed Singh'.)		1782–1815	
Annexation by the Sikh Empire		1815	
Jagirdars
Umed Singh		1815–1849	
Annexation by the British		1849	
Titular
Umed Singh		1849–1854	
Jai Singh		1854–1856	
Ran Singh		1856–1892	
Raghunath Singh		1892–1918	
Lachman Singh		1918 – ?	

== Religion ==
In surviving portraits of the rajas from Raja Ajit Singh to Raja Umed Singh, they were all depicted wearing Vaishnava tilaks.

== Artwork ==
There is evidence that a member of the Seu-Manaku-Nainsukh artisan family may have worked at Jaswan State at one time. However, no surviving paintings produced at Jaswan have come down to us. However, portraits produced in other hill states of some of the rulers of Jaswan have been recorded.

== See also ==
- Inder Singh
