= Siba State =

Former independent Indian state

Coordinates: 31.91989°N 76.11749°E

- Princely State
- ca.1450–1849
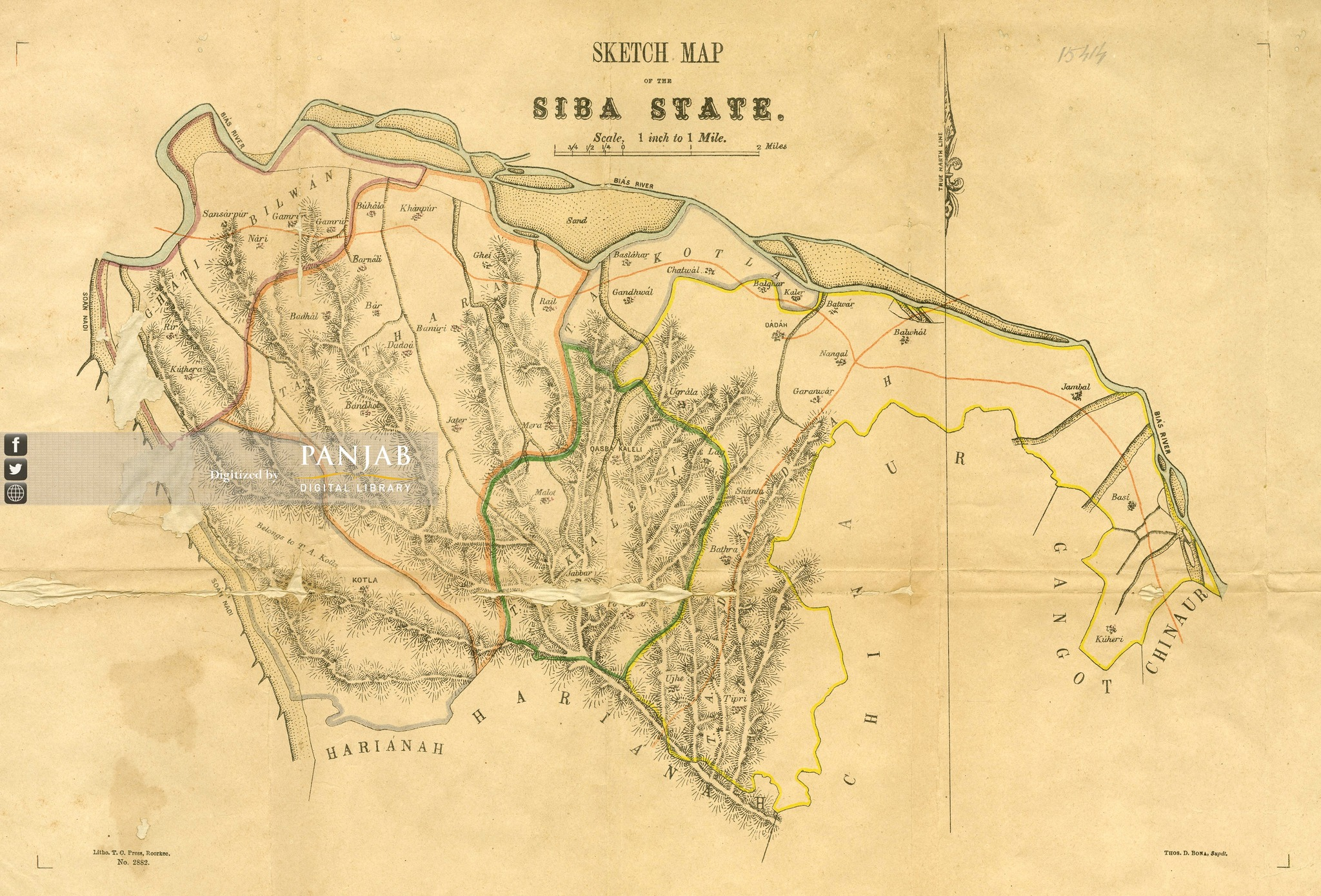
- Sketch map of the Siba State, 1882. Digitized by the Panjab Digital Library.
- History
  - Foundation of the state: ca.1450
  - Annexed by the British: 1849
| Preceded by | Succeeded by |
| Guler State | Presidencies and provinces of British India |

Siba State, later known as Dada-Siba jagir, was a small independent Indian hill state in the Lower Himalayas. It was centered on the town of Dadasiba, Pragpur tehsil, Kangra district, in modern-day Himachal Pradesh. The state was founded in ca.1450. In 1849 the territory of Datarpur was added to Siba Jagir (1/3 part of land of Mian Devi Singh) and annexed by the British Raj as 'Dada-Siba'. Rest remained in the possession of Raja Ram Singh son of Raja Gobind Singh.

== Location ==
Siba was a small hill state that bordered Jaswan State to the south, the Punjab Plains to the southwest and west, Guler State to the north, and Datarpur and Kangra states to the east. The northern border was marked by the Beas River and the southern demarcation was naturally marked by a steep ridge consisting of courses of water and boulders.

== History ==
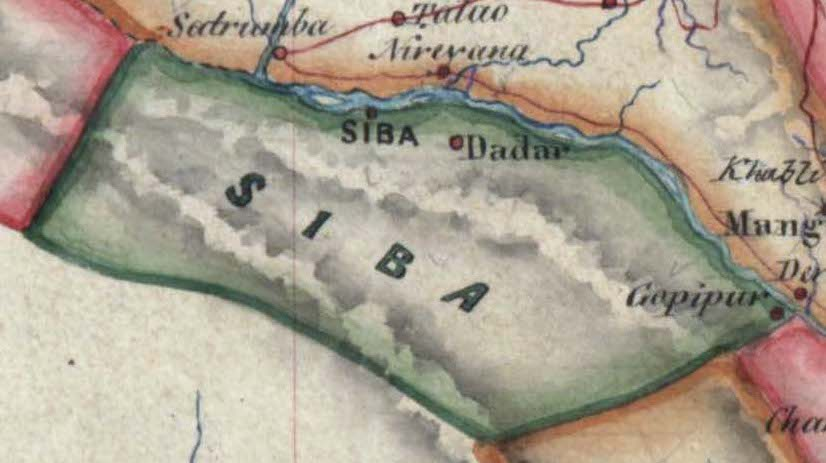
Detail of the territory of Siba State from a map of the various Hill States of the Punjab Hills region, copied in 1852

Siba State was founded by Raja Sibaran Chand, the younger brother of the raja of Guler State in circa 1450. Thus, Siba State was an offshoot of Guler State. The ruling family came from the Sibaia (Sabaia) clan, sharing relations with the royals of Kangra, Guler, Jaswan, and Datarpur states.

During the reign of Raja Amar Chand (r. ca.1690 – 1705), Siba joined forces with Chamba, Kahlur (Bilaspur), and Mandi states to defend Guler state (which was ruled by Raja Dalip Singh at the time) against an attack launched by Jammu State.

When Sher Singh (r. ca.1770–ca.1800, s/o of Raja Madho Singh) was on the throne, Siba became a tributary to Raja Sansar Chand of Kangra in 1786. The Gurkhas launched an attack on Kangra State in 1806–09, which left Siba state vulnerable to an attack by Raja Bhup Singh of Guler State. The state was seized by Guler State in 1808, which annexed it. The following year in 1809, Guler became a tributary to the Sikhs, and in 1813, Guler (along with the former Siba State) was annexed by the Sikh Empire. In 1813 it was untouched by Maharaja Ranjit Singh, founder of the Sikh Empire of Pañjab (Punjab), although divided into two, one part was left for Raja Govind Singh as Princely state for his sustenance and the second one third part was left for Mian Devi Singh, cousin of Raja Gobind Singh. One third part of Mian Devi Singh was annexed by the British in 1849. Rest remained with Raja Ram Singh.

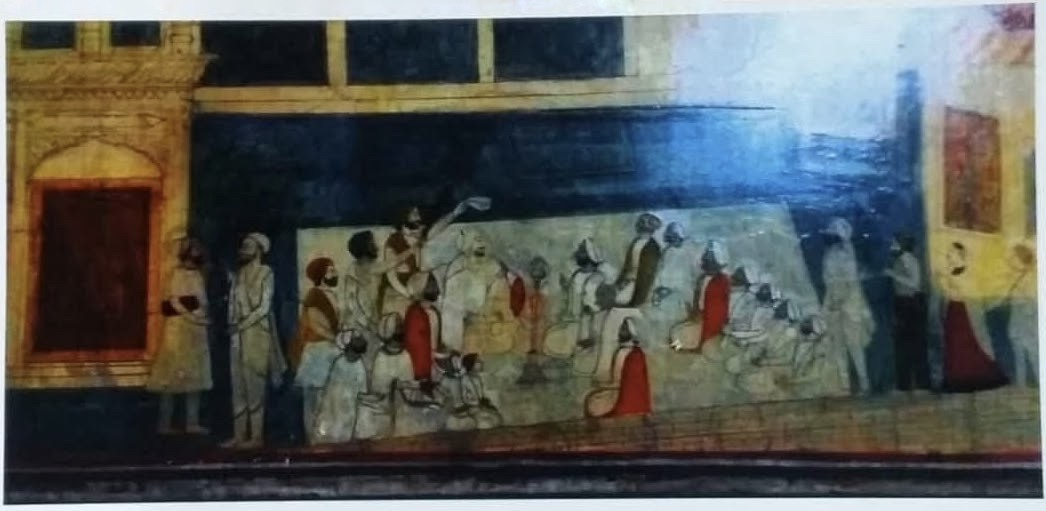
Painting of a darbar scene of Siba

In 1830, independence was restored to Siba, likely due to Raja Govind Singh's two daughters being wed to Dhian Singh of the Lahore Darbar. This offering of his daughters overcame a cultural restriction regarding marriage that affected Dhian Singh due to his lineage, which led to quid pro quo being given-back to Govind Singh, thus explaining the restoration of his rule. Three-quarters of the state was given to Raja Govind Singh and the remaining fourth was handed-over to Mian Devi Singh, whom was Govind's cousin. However, Siba Fort remained under Sikh-control as per the terms of the restoration of the state and Siba remained a tributary of the Sikhs from 1830 to 1845.

Govind's successor, Raja Ram Singh (r. 1845–1874) expelled the Sikhs during the Second Anglo-Sikh War. He also seized the share of Siba's territory that was controlled by his cousin, Bijai Singh (whom was the son of Mian Devi Singh). In 1849, the states of Datarpur and Siba were joined and formed Dada-Siba, which was annexed by the British and joined to the Kangra district. However, even after the annexation, Ram Singh was allowed to retain a jagir and his title of raja. Ram Singh renovated the Radha-Krishna temple of Siba and constructed a palace on a hill-top. The British would restore the quarterly share of territory of Siba that Ram seized earlier back to Bijai in 1858. Ram Singh had no issue and after his death, the palace he had constructed atop of the hill was abandoned and left to decay. Ram Singh's cousin and successor, Bijai Singh, married a princess of Jammu State. The issue of this marriage was Jai Singh.

== Rulers ==
The rulers of Siba State had the title Raja. The names of the rulers were originally appended with Chand but later rulers appended their name with Singh.

List of rulers of Siba State
| Name | Portrait | Reign | References |
|---|---|---|---|
| Sibaran Chand | | ca.1450 – ? | |
| Kilas Chand | | ca.1550 – ? | |
| Sansar Chand | | ? | |
| Narain Chand | | ? | |
| Tilok Chand | | ? | |
| Kishan Chand | | ? | |
| Jai Chand | | ? | |
| Prithi Chand | | ? | |
| Amar Chand | | ca.1690 – 1705 | |
| Jaswant Chand | | ca.1705 – ca.1720 | |
| Bhao Singh (Note: Also known as 'Bhag Singh'.) | | ca.1720 – ca.1735 | |
| Lakel Singh | | ca.1735 – ca.1750 | |
| Madho Singh | | ca.1750 – 1770 | |
| Sher Singh | | ca.1770 – ca.1800 | |
| Govind Singh (1st) (Note: His name is alternatively spelt as 'Gobind Singh'.) | | ca.1800 – 1808 | |
| Occupation by Guler State | | 1808 – 1809 | |
| Tributary to the Sikh Empire | | 1808 – 1813 | |
| Annexation by the Sikh Empire | | 1813 – 1830 | |
| Govind Singh (2nd) | | 1830 – 1845 | |
| Ram Singh | | 1845 – 1849 | |
| Annexation by the British | | 1849 | |
| Ram Singh | | 1849 – 1874 | |
| Bijai Singh (Note: Also spelt as 'Bije Singh'.) | | 1874 – 1879 | |
| Jai Singh | | 1879 – 1920 | |
| Jaginder Singh (Note: Also known as 'Gajendra Singh'.) | | 1920 – 1926 | |
| Sham Singh | | 1926 – 1932 | |
| Harmahendra Singh | | 1932 – | |

== Artwork ==
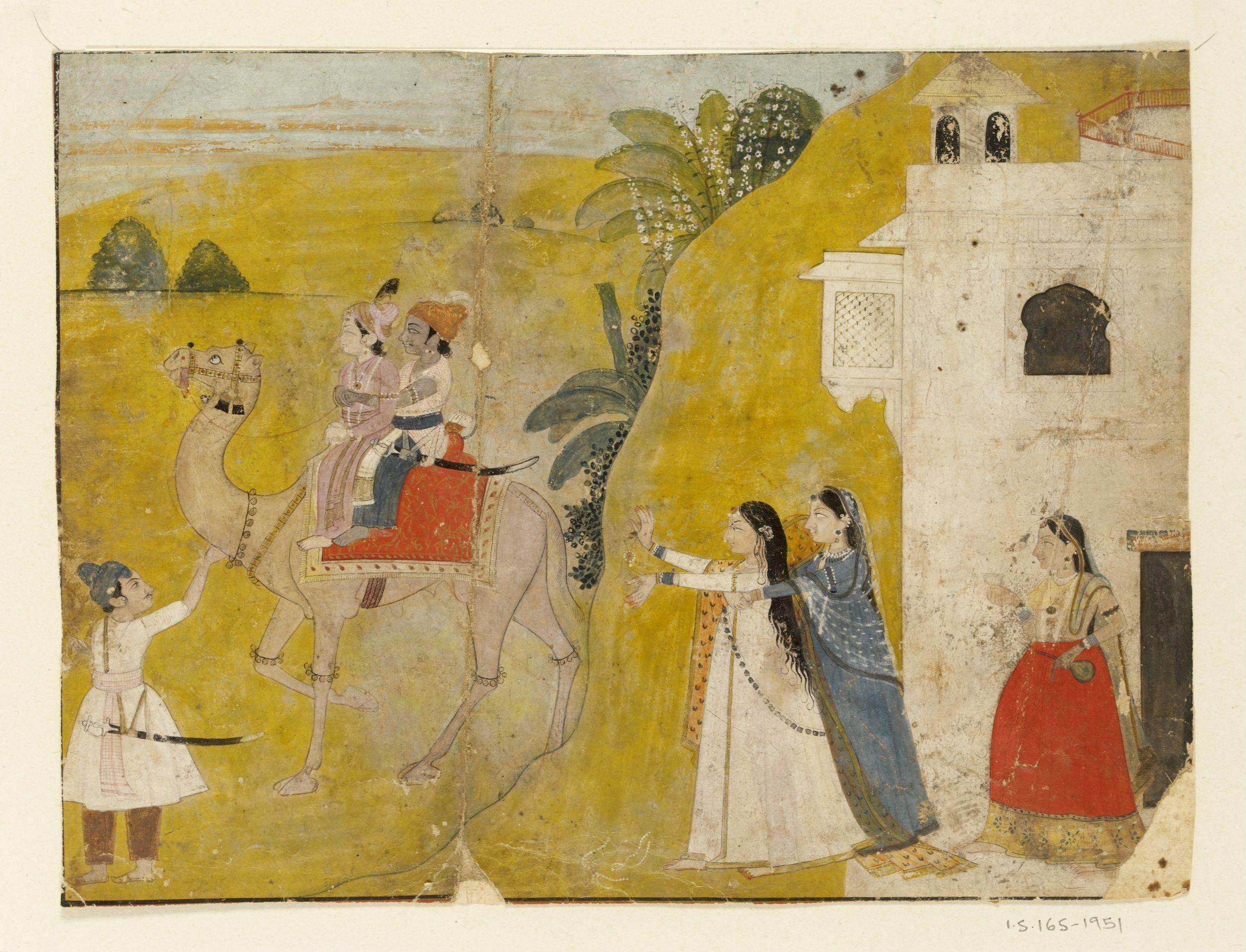
'The Lovers Are Parted', from a Sassi Punnu series, Siba, ca.1800

There are no ancestral collections of paintings left in the collection of the descendants of the Siba ruling family. However, there is evidence that a member of the Seu-Manaku-Nainsukh artisan family may have once worked at Siba. The Radha-Krishna temple at Siba hosts wall paintings, which were painted during the reign of Raja Sher Singh in the late 18th century and the temple and its paintings were restored the following century during the reign of Raja Ram Singh. During the period of Sikh influence over Siba, the Sikh School of art likely influenced local Siba artwork.

== See also ==
- List of Rajput dynasties
- Guler State
