= Datarpur State =

Princely state in Punjab

Coordinates: 31.82°N 75.66°E

Datarpur State दातारपुर ਦਾਤਾਰਪੁਰ
- Princely State
- 1550–1818
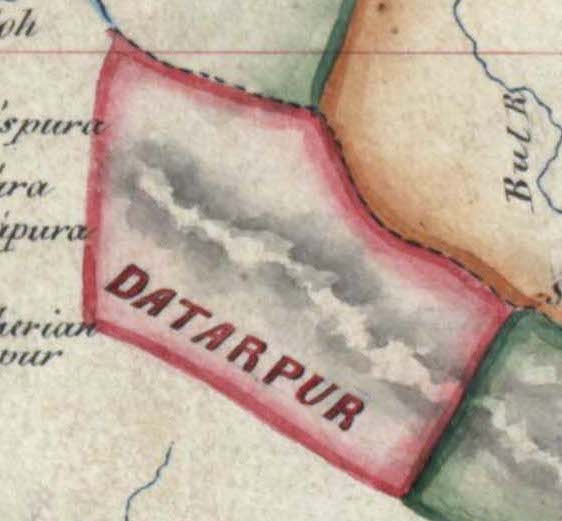
- Detail of Datarpur from a map of the various Hill States of the Punjab Hills region, copied in 1852
- History
  - Foundation of the state: 1550
  - Annexation by the Sikh Empire: 1818
Preceded by	Succeeded by
Guler State	Sikh Empire

Datarpur State was a small precolonial Indian hill state in the Lower Himalayas. The state was founded around 1550 and was annexed by the Sikh Empire in 1818.

== History ==
Datarpur State was founded in the middle of the sixteenth century by Raja Datar Chand, a scion of the princely families of Siba and Guler who named the state after himself. From 1786 the state was a feudatory of Kangra State until Raja Govind Chand made an alliance with the Gurkha invaders from Nepal in 1806, securing his complete independence. Govind Chand was succeeded by his son Jagat Chand when Datarpur was conquered by Ranjit Singh of Lahore in 1818 and annexed to the Sikh Empire of Pañjab (Punjab), although a jagir was granted to Jagat Chand as compensation. In 1848, Jagat Chand joined a rebellion against the British and was deposed, dispossessed and exiled to Almora. The territory of Datarpur was added to Siba State and annexed by the British Raj in 1849 as Dada-Siba. The descendants of Jagat Chand were given no jagir, but the royal house still exists.

== Rulers ==
They bore the title 'Raja'.

Rajas

- ca. 1550 – ... Datar Chand
- ... – ... Ganesh Chand
- ... – ... Chatar Chand
- ... – ... Udai Chand
- ... – ... Prithi Chand
- ... – ... Jai Chand
- ... – ... Dalel Chand
- ... – ... Ugar Chand
- ... –1806 Nand Chand
- 1806–1818 Govind Chand
- 1818–1848 Jagat Chand - in rebellion (died 1877)

== See also ==
- List of Rajput dynasties
- Siba State
