= Gautama (name) =

Given name and surname of Sanskrit origin

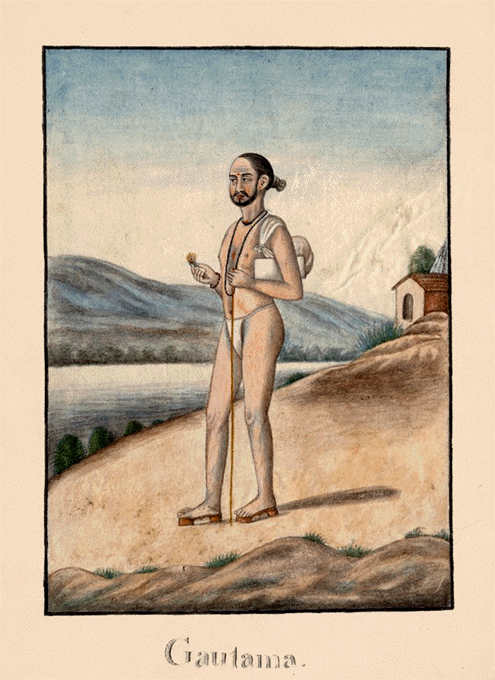
- Maharshi Gautama by Raja Ravi Verma
- Pronunciation: Vedic Sanskrit: [ɡɑːw.tɐ.mɐ́] Classical Sanskrit: [ɡɑw.t̪ɐ.mɐ] Hindi: [gɔːt̪əm] Bengali: [gou̯t̪ɔm] Marathi: [gəut̪əm] Nepali: [gʌu̯t̪ʌm]
- Gender: Male
- Language: Languages of South Asia

Other gender
- Feminine: Gautami

Origin
- Language: Sanskrit
- Meaning: descendant of Gotama
- Region of origin: Indian subcontinent

Other names
- Alternative spelling: Gautam, Goutam, Gautham, Gowtham, Gotam
- Cognate: Gaotəma (Avestan)

Gautama (Classical Sanskrit: /ɡɑw.t̪ɐ.mɐ/ IAST: Gautama), also spelled Gautam, Goutam, Gautham, Gowtham, and Gotam is a given name and surname of Sanskrit origin. It means "relative of Gotama".

Goutam is the usual Bengali transcription of the name.

== Etymology and attestations ==
Gautama is a Vṛddhi patronymic derivative of Gotama (Classical Sanskrit: /ɡoː.t̪ɐ.mɐ/ IAST: Gotama), meaning "related to Gotama". Gotama means "richest in cows" according to Mayrhofer (1992) or "the largest ox" according to Monier-Williams (1899).

Gautama is the name or part of the name of important religious figures such as Maharshi Gautama, the Buddha (Siddhartha Gautama), the founder of the Nyaya school of Hindu philosophy Akṣapāda Gautama, and Mahavira's chief disciple (Ganadhara) Gautama Swami (Indrabhuti Gautama).

The name is attested in the Avesta once, in Yt. 13.16: “An eloquent man will be born, who makes his words heard in verbal contests, whose judgment is sought after, who comes away from the discussion victorious over the defeated Gaotəma.”. The name Ka-u-da-ma found in the Persepolis tablets may linguistically be the same as Gaotəma, and related to Gautama.

== Incidence ==
As of 2014, 'Gautam' is the 2,179th most common given name in the world, with a total of 464,750 people named it. It is the 276th most common given name in India, with 446,365 people named it, the 725th most common given name in Nepal, with 5,183 people named it, and the 3,189th most common given name in Bangladesh, with 4,949 people named it. It is primarily a male name. A total of 357,140 people in the world bear it as their surname. It is the 313th most common surname in India, with 233,387 people having it. It is the 54th most common surname in Nepal, with 113,669 people having it. 'Goutam' is the 937th most common given name in India, with 163,102 people named it. It is the name of 18,146 people in Bangladesh. It is also primarily a male name. A total of 12,896 in the world bear it as their surname.

== Given name ==
=== Historical ===
- Maharshi Gautama, one of the Saptarshis
- Gautama Bai Holkar (1694–1761), first Queen of the Holkar dynasty
- Gautama Siddha, Chinese astronomer, astrologer and compiler of Indian descent

=== Modern ===
- Gautam A. Rana, American lawyer and United States ambassador to Slovakia since 2022
- Gautam Adani (born 1962), Indian billionaire and founder and chairman of the Adani Group
- Gautam Bambawale (born 1958), Indian diplomat
- Gautam Bhadra (born 1948), Indian historian
- Goutam Bhaduri (born 1962), Indian judge in the Chhattisgarh High Court
- Gautam Bhan, Indian urban researcher and writer
- Gautam Bhatia (architect), Indian architect
- Gautam Bhatia (lawyer) (born 1988), Indian lawyer
- Gautam Bhattacharya, Indian journalist and author
- Gautam Biswas (born 1956), Indian professor of mechanical engineering at BITS Pilani, former director of IIT Guwahati and CSIR-CMERI Durgapur
- Gautam Bora, politician in Assam, India
- Goutam Buddha Das (academic administrator) (born 1963), Bangladeshi academic and former vice-chancellor of Chittagong Veterinary and Animal Sciences University
- Goutam Buddha Das (politician), Odisha politician
- Gautam Chabukswar, Maharashtra politician
- Gautam Chakroborty (1954–2022), Bangladeshi politician
- Gautam Sharma "Vyathit" (born 1938), Indian folklorist and playwright
- Gautam Chattopadhyay (1949–1999), Indian Bengali singer, songwriter, bassist, and composer
- Gautam Choudhury (born 1940), Indian musician
- Gautam Das (1978–2005), Bangladeshi journalist
- Gautam Das, Indian-American computer scientist
- Gautam Deb (born 1954), politician in West Bengal, India
- Gautam Dutta (born 1973), Indian cricketer
- Gautam Gambhir (born 1981), Indian cricketer
- Goutam Ghose (born 1950), Indian film director, actor, music director and cinematographer
- Gautam Gulati (born 1987), Indian actor
- Gautam Gupta (born 1988), Indian television actor and model
- Goutam Halder (born 1963), Indian theatre and film actor
- Gautam Kalita, Indian bodybuilder
- Gautham Karthik (born 1989), Indian actor
- Gautam Kaul (film critic) (died 2024), Indian film critic and historian
- Gautam Kaul (finance professor) (born 1954), Indian-American professor of finance
- Gautam Kumar (born 1977), politician in Rajasthan, India
- Krishnappa Gowtham (born 1988), Indian cricketer
- Gautam Malkani (born 1976), British financial journalist and author
- Gautam Mitra (born 1941), British operational research scientist
- Gautam Mukhopadhaya (born 1956), Indian diplomat
- Gautam Navlakha, Indian activist
- Gautham P. Krishna, Indian actor
- Gautam Padmanabhan, Indian publishing executive and CEO of Westland Books
- Goutam Paul, politician in West Bengal, India
- Gautam Radhakrishna Desiraju (born 1952), Indian structural chemist and professor at the Indian Institute of Science
- Gautam Raghavan, Indian-American political advisor
- Gautam Rajadhyaksha (1950–2011), Indian fashion photographer
- Gautham Raju, Tollywood Indian actor
- Gautham Ramachandran, Indian film director, screenwriter and producer
- Gautam A. Rana, American lawyer and diplomat
- Gautam Rode (born 1977), Indian actor
- Gautam Roy (born 1948), politician in Assam, India; and former vice president of BCCI and former president of ACA
- Gautam Sanyal, Indian civil servant
- Gautam Sarabhai (1917–1995), Indian industrialist and businessman
- Gautam Sarkar (born 1950), Indian footballer and coach
- Gautam Sen, Indian journalist, writer and automotive designer
- Gautam Shah, Indian surgical and insurance businessman
- Gautam Sharma, Indian television and film actor
- Gautham K. Sharma, Indian model and actor
- Gautam Shiknis (born 1971), Indian film distributor
- Gautam Shome Jr. (born 1963), Indian cricketer
- Gautam Shome Sr. (1958–2023), Indian cricketer
- Gautam Shrestha (born 2002), Nepali footballer
- Gautham Sigamani, Indian politician
- Gautam Singhania (born 1965), Indian industrialist
- Gautam Srivastava (born 1972), India-American music executive
- Gowtham Sundararajan, Indian actor and choreographer
- Gotam Tetwal, politician in Madhya Pradesh, India
- Gautam Thapar (born 1960), Indian businessman
- Gautama V. Vajracharya (born 1940), Nepali scholar
- Gautam Vadhera (born 1972), Indian cricketer
- Gautam Vaghela (1936–2010), Indian artist
- Gautham Vasudev Menon (born 1973), Indian film director, screenwriter and film producer
- Gautam Vig (born 1987), Indian model and actor

== Surname ==
=== Historical ===
- Akṣapāda Gautama, composer of the Nyāya Sūtras and founder of the Nyāya school of Hindu philosophy
- Indrabhuti Gautama, commonly known as Gautama Swami, Ganadhara (chief disciple) of the 24th Tirthankara of Jainism, Mahavira
- Medhatithi Gautama, ancient Indian logician
- Siddhartha Gautama, the Buddha, wandering ascetic and founder of Buddhism

=== Modern ===
- Aditi Gautam, Indian model and actress
- Atul Gautam (1973–2005), Nepali musician
- Archana Gautam (born 1994 or 1995), Indian actress, model and politician
- Balmukund Goutam, Indian politician
- Bam Dev Gautam, Nepali politician, former Home Minister and Deputy Prime Minister of Nepal
- Chidhambaram Muralidharen Gautam (born 1986), Indian cricketer
- Dhanush Chandra Gautam (1932–2006) a.k.a. Dha. Cha. Gotame, Nepali writer
- Dhruba Chandra Gautam (born 1943), Nepali writer
- Dhwani Gautam (born 1985), Indian filmmaker
- Hari Gautam, Indian cardiologist, chancellor of Shri Lal Bahadur Shastri National Sanskrit University, former vice-chancellor of Banaras Hindu University and former chairman of the University Grants Commission (India)
- Indri Gautama, Indonesian Christian leader
- Kalyan Gautam, Nepali storyteller and radio personality
- Khimlal Gautam, mountaineer and Nepali civil servant
- Krishna Murari Gautam, Nepali riter, poet, comedian and social activist
- Kul Gautam, diplomat, development professional, former senior official of the United Nations, and former special advisor to the Prime Minister of Nepal on international affairs
- Kulchandra Gautam (born 1877), Nepali scholar
- L N Gautam (born 1981), Nepali film director
- Laxmi Gautam (born 1963), Indian academic and social worker
- Mukesh Gautam, Indian film director
- N. Gautham (born 1955), Indian academic
- Navneet Gautam, Indian kabaddi player
- Pratima Gautam, Nepali politician
- Pushpa Bhusal Gautam, Nepali advocate, politician and former deputy speaker of the House of Representatives (Nepal)
- Rajendra Prasad Gautam, Nepali politician
- Ram Kumar Gautam, politician in Haryana, India
- Rashmi Gautam (born 1984), Indian actress
- Ravindra Gautam, Indian film and television director
- Rishikesh Gautam (born 1941), Nepali politician
- Sanjay Kumar Gautam, Nepali politician
- Satish Kumar Gautam (born 1972), Indian politician
- Shatrughan Gautam, politician in Rajasthan, India
- Sheela Gautam (1931–2019), Indian politician and businesswoman
- Shiv Raj Gautam, Nepali politician
- Sobita Gautam (born 1995), Nepali politician
- Srikant Gautam, Indian lyricist and film director
- Sudarshan Gautam, Canadian mountaineer and actor
- Suren Gautam, Nepali singer
- Surilie Gautam (born 1990), Indian film and television actress
- Tirtha Gautam (born 1963), Nepali politician
- Umesh Gautam (born 1970), Indian politician
- Varsha Gautham (born 1998), Indian athlete
- Yami Gautam (born 1988), Indian actress
