= Gautam (Nepali name) =

Gautam is a common surname native to the Atri Brahmins of Nepal and India. Notable people with the surname name include:

- Atithi Gautam K. C, youngest singer in the world with a professional solo album
- Atul Gautam, Nepalese musician
- Bam Dev Gautam, former Deputy Prime Minister of Nepal
- Dhanush Chandra Gautam, famous writer and recipient of Madan Puraskar
- Dhruba Chandra Gautam, Nepalese writer and novelist
- Divya Gautam (born 1991), Indian academic and politician
- Guru Maharaj Narayan Gautam Khatri known as "Swami Hamsananda", Hindu saint and founder of Swargadwari Temple complex of Nepal in the 20th century
- Kalyan Gautam, Nepalese radio jockey
- Kashinath Gautam, former Minister of Health in B.P. Koirala Government
- Khimlal Gautam, Chief Survey Officer of Nepalese government and highest ranking government official to climb Mount Everest
- Krishna Murari Gautam, writer, comedian and social activist popularly known as Chatyang Master
- Kul Gautam, former Vice Secretary General of United Nations and Deputy Executive Director of UNICEF
- L N Gautam, Nepalese film producer and director
- Pandit Kulchandra Gautam, prominent Sanskrit scholar of Nepal featured in the postage stamp of Nepal in 1992
- Prakash Gautam, Nepalese politician and Member of Parliament
- Pratima Gautam, Nepalese politician and Member of Parliament
- Pushpa Bhusal Gautam, former deputy speaker of the House of Representatives of the federal parliament of Nepal
- Rajan Gautam, Nepalese politician and Member of Parliament
- Rajendra Prasad Gautam, Nepalese politician and former Member of Parliament
- Rishikesh Gautam, Nepalese politician
- Sanjay Kumar Gautam, former Minister of Irrigation in the federal government of Nepal
- Shiv Raj Gautam, Nepalese politician
- Sobita Gautam, Nepalese politician and the youngest elected female member of Parliament, and Minister of Law, Justice and Parliamentary Affairs
- Sudarshan Gautam, Canadian mountain climber and actor
- Sudha Sharma Gautam, Nepalese doctor and Minister of Health and Population
- Suren Gautam, Nepalese singer
- Tirtha Gautam, Nepalese politician and Member of Parliament
- Umakanta Gautam, Nepalese politician and Minister of Internal Affairs and Law of Koshi Province
