= Fourth premiership of K. P. Sharma Oli =

As Prime Minister of Nepal, 2024–2025

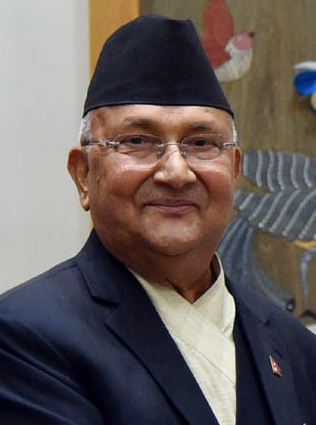
- Oli in New Delhi, 2018
- Fourth Premiership of KP Sharma Oli; 15 July 2024 – 9 September 2025
- President: Ram Chandra Paudel
- Cabinet: Oli IV
- Party: CPN (UML)
- Seat: Singha Durbar
- Coat of Arms of Government of Nepal

Khadga Prasad Sharma Oli was appointed as Prime Minister of Nepal on 14 July 2024. He officially took oath the following day on 15 July 2024. Oli's fourth tenure came after previous Prime Minister Pushpa Kamal Dahal, who was in coalition with Oli, failed to secure the necessary votes in his fourth vote of confidence. He resigned on 9 September 2025 after protests erupted in Nepal following a ban on social media that turned violent.

== Background ==
In the 2022 general election, Oli led CPN (UML), with 78 seats, became the second-largest party in the House of Representatives. Oli was reelected from Jhapa 5 with a majority of over 29,000 votes. After power-sharing talks broke down inside the Nepali Congress led ruling alliance, Oli and Dahal brokered a deal, backing Dahal's bid as prime minister. The UML withdrew from the coalition government ahead of the presidential election in March 2023 after Dahal decided to back Nepali Congress candidate instead. Oli later joined hands with Dahal again in March 2024.

Following disagreements with the prime minister and other coalition partners about the annual budget and citing the need for a stable government of national consensus, Oli and Nepali Congress' Deuba agreed on 1 July 2024 to form a rotational government with the two party chairs serving equal time as prime minister. CPN (UML) withdrew its support from the Dahal government, and following a failed a motion of confidence for Dahal in the House on 12 July, Oli was appointed prime minister for a fourth stint on 14 July as part of a coalition with the Nepali Congress, and sworn in the following day.

== Administration ==
=== Council of Ministers ===
S.N.	Portfolio	Minister	Political party	Assumed office	Left office	Ref.
Prime Minister
1.	Prime Minister of Nepal	KP Sharma Oli	CPN (UML)	15 July 2024	9 September 2025	
Deputy Prime Minister
2.	Deputy Prime Minister; Minister for Urban Development	Prakash Man Singh	Nepali Congress	15 July 2024	9 September 2025	
3.	Deputy Prime Minister; Minister for Finance	Bishnu Prasad Paudel	CPN (UML)	15 July 2024	9 September 2025	
Cabinet Ministers
4.	Minister for Communication and Information Technology	Prithvi Subba Gurung	CPN (UML)	15 July 2024	9 September 2025	
5.	Minister for Home Affairs	Ramesh Lekhak	Nepali Congress	15 July 2024	9 September 2025	
6.	Minister for Labour, Employment and Social Security	Sharat Singh Bhandari	Loktantrik Samajwadi	15 July 2024	9 September 2025	
7.	Minister for Foreign Affairs	Arzu Rana Deuba	Nepali Congress	15 July 2024	9 September 2025	
8.	Minister for Water Supply	Pradeep Yadav	People's Socialist Party	15 July 2024	9 September 2025	
9.	Minister for Land Management, Cooperatives and Poverty Alleviation	Balaram Adhikari	CPN (UML)	15 July 2024	9 September 2025	
10.	Minister for Industry, Commerce and Supplies	Damodar Bhandari	CPN (UML)	15 July 2024	9 September 2025	
11.	Minister for Women, Children and Senior Citizen	Nawal Kishor Sah	People's Socialist Party	15 July 2024	9 September 2025	
12.	Minister for Physical Infrastructure and Transport	Devendra Dahal	CPN (UML)	15 July 2024	9 September 2025	
13.	Minister for Youth and Sports	Teju Lal Chaudhary	Nepali Congress	15 July 2024	9 September 2025	
14.	Minister for Health and Population	Pradip Paudel	Nepali Congress	15 July 2024	9 September 2025	
15.	Minister for Law, Justice and Parliamentary Affairs	Ajay Chaurasiya	Nepali Congress	15 July 2024	9 September 2025	
16.	Minister for Culture, Tourism and Civil Aviation	Badri Pandey	Nepali Congress	15 July 2024	9 September 2025	
17.	Minister for Agriculture and Livestock Development	Ram Nath Adhikari	Nepali Congress	15 July 2024	9 September 2025	
18.	Minister for Education, Science and Technology	Bidya Bhattarai	CPN (UML)	15 July 2024	22 April 2025	
18.	Minister for Education, Science and Technology	Raghuji Pant	CPN (UML)	24 April 2025	9 September 2025	
19.	Minister for Defence	Manbir Rai	CPN (UML)	15 July 2024	9 September 2025	
20.	Minister for Energy, Water Resources and Irrigation	Deepak Khadka	Nepali Congress	15 July 2024	9 September 2025	
21.	Minister for Federal Affairs and General Administration	Raj Kumar Gupta	CPN (UML)	15 July 2024	9 September 2025	
22.	Minister for Forests and Environment	Aain Bahadur Shahi Thakuri	Nepali Congress	15 July 2024	9 September 2025	
State Ministers
23.	Minister of state for Culture, Tourism and Civil Aviation	Arun Kumar Chaudhary	Nagrik Unmukti	3 August 2024	9 September 2025	
24.	Minister of state for Forests and Environment	Rupa Bishwakarma	Nepali Congress	3 August 2024	9 September 2025	
25.	Minister of state for Energy, Water Resources and Irrigation	Purna Bahadur Tamang	Nepali Congress	3 August 2024	23 April 2025	
25.	Minister of state for Energy, Water Resources and Irrigation	Kham Bahadur Garbuja	Nepali Congress	4 May 2025	12 September 2025	

Oli's government is a coalition that includes the CPN (UML), Nepali Congress, PSP, LSP and NUP.

=== Advisors ===
Bishnu Rimal is the political advisor while Yuba Raj Khatiwada is the economic advisor.

== Foreign Policy and Trips ==
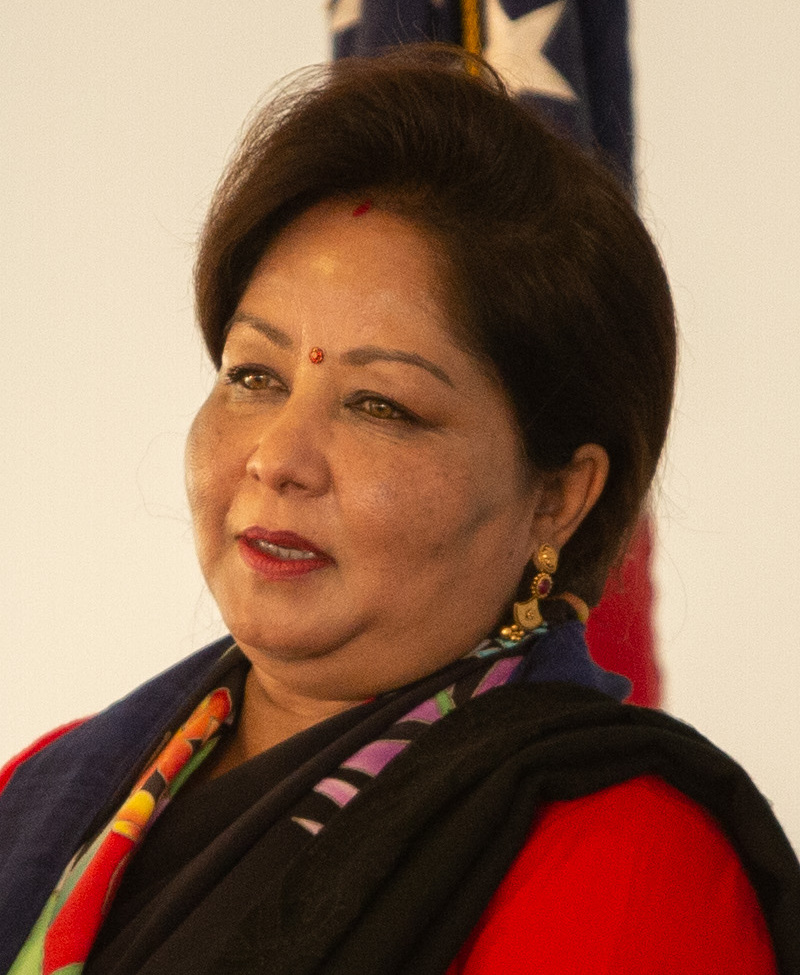
Minister for Foreign Affairs Arzu Rana Deuba 15 July 2024 — 12 September 2025

=== Foreign Trips ===
	Country	Areas visited	Dates	Details
1	United States	New York City	September 20–30 2024	To attend the 79th Session of UNGA
2	China	Beijing	December 2–5 2024	Official Visit
3	Thailand	Bangkok	April 1–5 2025	To attend 6th BIMSTEC summit
4	Spain	Seville , Madrid	June 28 – July 4 2025	To attend Fourth International Conference on Financing for Development (FFD4)
5	Turkmenistan	Awaza	August 3–8 2025	To attend the Third United Nations Conference on Landlocked Developing Countries (LLDCs)
6	China	Tianjin, Beijing	August 30 – September 4 2025	To attend 2025 Tianjin SCO summit and 2025 China Victory Day Parade

Oli's first visit as the new prime minister was to New York, USA to attend the Seventy-ninth session of the United Nations General Assembly. In the sidelines, he also met Indian Prime Minister Narendra Modi of India and discussed about energy, technology and trade. Oli discussed about trade, labour and investment with Sabah Al-Khalid Al-Sabah, Crown Prince of Kuwait. Oli also met Prime Minister of Bhutan, Tshering Tobgay.

== Domestic Policy ==
=== Energy Policy ===
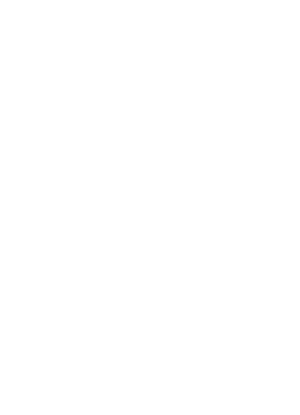
Minister for Energy, Water Resources and Irrigation
Deepak Khadka
15 July 2024 – 12 September 2025

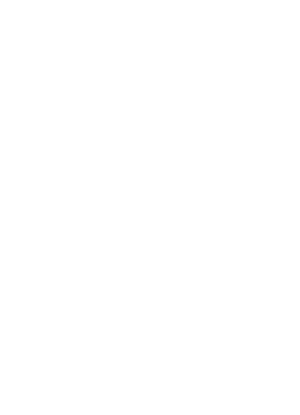
Minister for state for Energy, Water Resources and Irrigation
Purna Bahadur Tamang
3 August 2024 – 23 April 2025

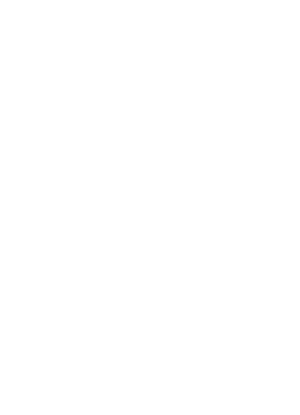
Minister for state for Energy, Water Resources and Irrigation
Kham Bahadur Garbuja
4 May 2025 – 12 September 2025

Oli chaired an inter-ministerial meeting including Deepak Khadka on October 8 2024, to formulate a "28,500 MW by 2035" energy strategy, from which 15000 MW would be exported and 13500 MW would be consumed domestically. The government planned to increase energy production, diversify energy trade, build a dedicated transmission line to export energy to Bangladesh via India. In the previous week, a newly tripartite agreement was signed with India and Bangladesh to send 40 MW to Bangladesh (via India). According to Khadka, the government would work towards mobilizing investment and advancing construction for various projects in Upper Karnali, Bheri and Jagadulla. He also amended the upcoming budget to introduce a "take-and-pay" mechanism in electricity purchasing. Kulman Ghising, Director of Nepal Electricity Authority, was removed from his Position by Oli's government on March 24 2025. NEA had previously cut off power to several industrial firms due to unpaid electricity bill. The decision was reversed by government. The ministry had also asked clarification from Kulman on multiple occasions. Purna Bahadur Tamang, the minister of state for Energy, was sacked by the government on April 23 2025 due to coordination issues with Deepak Khadka and Tamang's support for Ghising. Kham Bahadur Garbuja was appointed in his place on April 30 2025 and took oath on May 4 2025.

=== Agriculture Policy ===
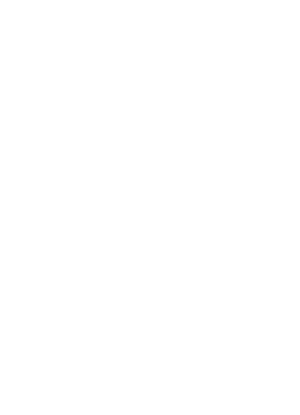
Minister for Agriculture and Livestock Development Ram Nath Adhikari 15 July 2024 — 9 September 2025

Oli, in a meeting, had directed Agriculture Ministry to ensure timely chemical fertilizer supplies for planting seasons and directed the ministry to plan for domestic fertilizer industry development, increased use of organic manure and reliable supply systems.
