= GGA =

GGA may refer to:

- Gga (Devanagari) (ॻ), used in Sindhi
- Apostolic Generation Church (Indonesian: Gereja Generasi Apostolik), an Indonesian church
- Gao language
- Generalized gradient approximation
- Georges Giralt PhD Award, a European scientific award in robotics
- Girl Guides Australia
- Goemon's Great Adventure, a 1998 video game
- Golden Gate Academy, in San Francisco, California, United States
- Gongora, a genus of orchid
- Good girl art
- Gossip Girl: Acapulco, a Mexican television series
- Governor-General of Australia
- Hotel and Restaurant Workers' Union (Austria), a former Austrian trade union
- GGA, a codon for the amino acid glycine
