= Gautama (disambiguation) =

Siddhartha Gautama, also known as the Buddha, was the founder of Buddhism.

Gautama or Gautam may also refer to:

== Ancient sages and philosophers ==
- Gautama Maharishi, one of the Saptarshi in Hinduism who authored hymns in Mandala 1 of the Rigveda
- Gautama Swami, a chief disciple of Mahavira, also known as Indrabhuti

== Etymology ==
- Gautama (etymology), meaning and history of the name "Gautam/Gautama"

== See also ==
=== Clans/ Subgroups ===
- Gautam Brahmins, a subgroup of Hindu Brahmins in India
- Gautam Rajputs, a sub-clan of Rajputs found in North India

=== Gautam (first name) ===
- Gautam (given name), the list of persons of Indian origin having "Gautam" as first (or given) name

=== Gautam (Nepali name) ===
- Gautam (Nepali name), the list of persons of Nepali origin having "Gautam" as last name

=== Places ===
- Gautam Ashram, the gurukul of the ancient Indian philosopher Gautama Akshapada
