= Rait, Himachal Pradesh =

Village in Himachal Pradesh, India

Rait (Hindi: रैत) is a village in the Kangra district, Himachal Pradesh, India. Rait is both a gram panchayat, and the centre of the Rait development block of Kangra district. It is a historically and culturally significant part of the Kangra valley, hosting sites and institutions related to Raja Sansar Chand, the Kangra school of Pahadi painting, Sanskrit learning, and Kangra's folk arts.

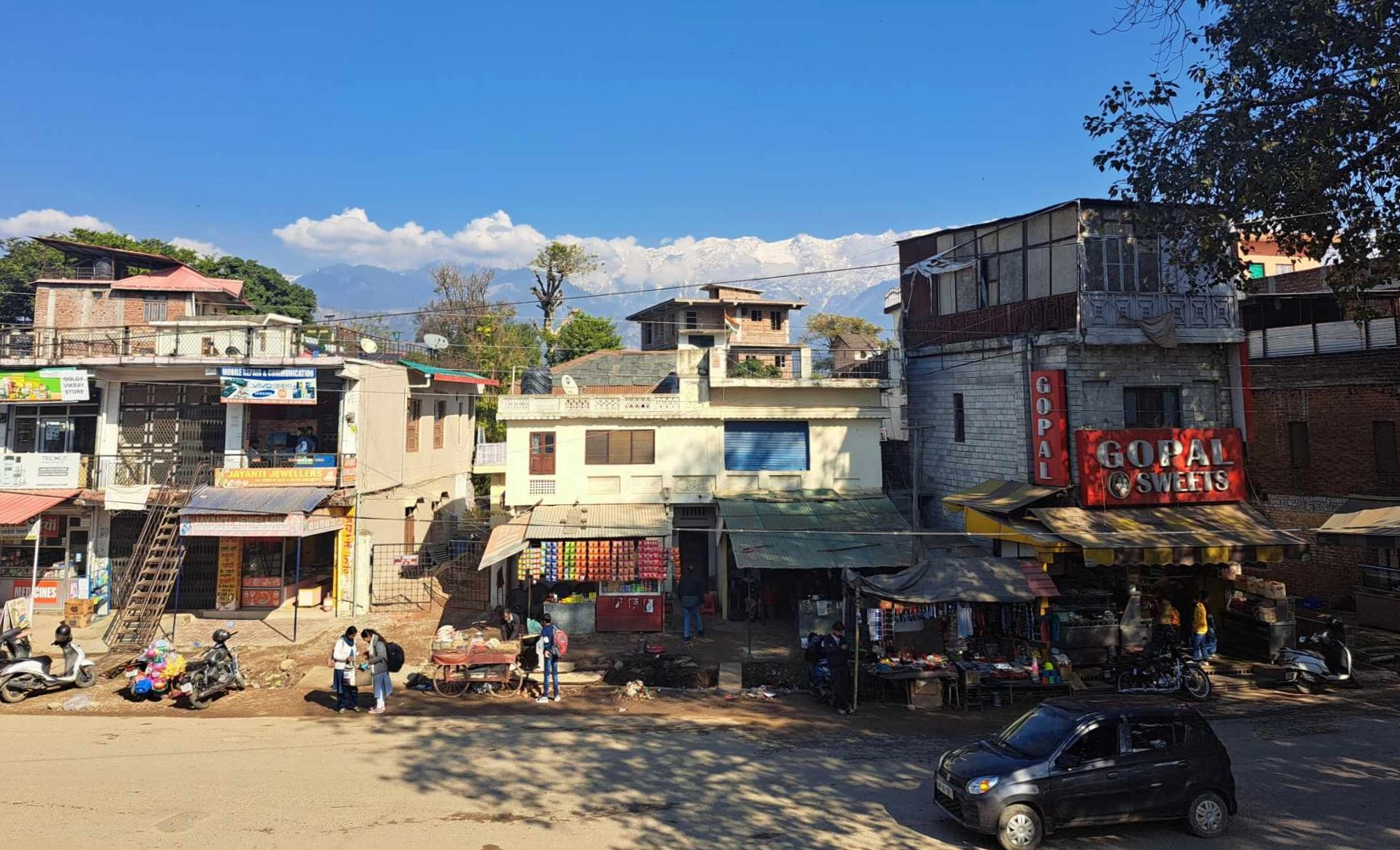
Rait village, Kangra valley, India. The Dhauladhar range can be seen in the distant background.

== Geography ==
Rait village is located on an elevated alluvial fan with the Dhauladhar range to its north. The village lies above the banks of the Chambi Khad, a tributary of the Gaj Khad, which in turn feeds into the Beas River.

== History ==
=== Pre-historic period ===
In 1975, it was reported that some pre-historic chopping tools had been found near Rait and the nearby village of Hatli.

=== Early modern period ===
Rait is located on the same alluvial fan as the villages Rihlu and Nerti, from which Rait is about 5 km and 1 km distant respectively. This fan formed the Rihlu ilaqa (territory), a Mughal appanage. Rihlu village had a small fort, the ruins of which can still be seen today. With the decline of Mughal power in the 18th century, the king of Chamba reasserted his hereditary claim on Rihlu ilaqa. In 1794, when Sansar Chand of Kangra's Katoch dynasty attempted to seize Rihlu ilaqa, Raja Raj Singh (the then king of Chamba) got the fort of Rihlu repaired, and advanced in person for the ilaqa's defence. But Raj Singh lost his life in the battlefield of Nerti. In 1796, a temple was erected at Nerti in memory of the fallen king, and in 1799, an annual fair was instituted to observe his death anniversary. The Kangri scholar Gautam Sharma Vyathit notes that the fair continues to be held every year in late June, both as a remembrance of Raja Raj Singh's self-sacrifice, and as a celebration of Kangra-Chamba friendship. Till several decades ago, the fair was held in Rait, Nerti, and Ghati Sanora. But with the building of the National Highway through Rait, in 1960 Rait became the main site for the fair, and continues to be so.

=== Colonial period ===
A Guide to the Kangra District, published in 1900, mentions Rait village as having a primary school and some shops. Among these was an agent of Kanyara Slate Company, for the sale of slates. This guide also mentions the nearby colonial-era bridge over the Chambi Khad, which by early 2025 had been in disuse for many years. Rait lay on the route from Panthankot to Kangra, and was accessible by tonga and ekka.

Settlements around the present-day Rait village, including villages such as Nerti, Rihlu, and Shahpur, were almost completely destroyed in the 1905 Kangra earthquake.

Vyathit records that for decades prior to India's Independence in 1947, there used to be a large Sanskrit school at Rait village. Pandit Padmanath Shastri was its head. This school had a collection of manuscripts related to the works of Pandits, Purohits, and Vaidyas. Pandit Vidyasagar, Sarandas Dixit, and Daulatram Dixit were some known Vaidyas associated with this school.

=== Post-Independence period ===
In 1945, the Indian freedom fighter and renunciate social reformer Swami Vijay Sheel (1907-1978) arrived at Nerti. Over 1945-50 he opened 13 schools for educating girls in and nearby Nerti. These were some of the first schools for girls in Kangra district. In the early 1970s, Swami shifted to Shahni's house in Rait village, where he would spend his last years, and pass away on 4 February 1978.

In 1958, Rait was made into a development block, which as of October 2024 comprised 61 gram panchayats. In 1967, Rait block was one of seven in the Kangra district to be taken up for intensive work under an Indo-German Package Programme for Agriculture. In 1967, an intensive padyatra of the Gramdan movement was launched in the Nagrota and Rait blocks of Kangra district. In Rait, the padyatra resulted in 104 gramdans.

In December 2020, Himachal Pradesh Chief Minister Jairam Thakur inaugurated the Kalyan Bhavan in Rait. In December 2023, the then Chief Minister Sukhvinder Singh Sukhu inaugurated the Block Development Office building at Rait.

As of April 2023, an alternate piece of land in the Lanj area of the Rait block had been proposed for the construction of a new airport in Kangra district, about 23 kms from the existing Gaggal airport.

== Culture ==
In 1966, Himachal Suprabhat, an Urdu fortnightly, began being published from Rait village. This publication was still in circulation in 1991.

Chandu Lal Raina, an exponent of the Kangra school of painting and a descendent of Pandit Seu and Nainsukh, was settled in Rait. In 1973, to revive Kangra painting, the Himachal Pradesh government started a training centre for young artists at Rait, with Chandu Lal Raina in charge as mentor. Raina trained 35 artists at this centre, and worked there till a year before his death on 5 May 1994.

In 1985, some researchers noted that Rait village was still inhabited exclusively by its native population which was little influenced by migrants and their culture.

In Himachal Pradesh, the town of Palampur, and the villages of Rait and Samloti were known for making wooden toys, even till the late 1990s.

Rait is also an important area for the pastoral Gaddi community, in the past as one of their traditional winter residence, and in the present more as their permanent residence.

== Demography ==
As per the 2011 Census of India, the Rait Development Block had a total of 22,962 households, and 1,04,115 persons living there.

== Transport ==
Rait village is located on the NH 154. It is 7.5 km from the Gaggal airport, and 17.5 km from Dharamshala.

== See also ==
- Gautam Vyathit
- Chamba state
- Kangra state
- Kangra Painting
- Kangra airport
