= AGC =

AGC may refer to:

== Transportation ==
- Allegheny County Airport in Pittsburgh, Pennsylvania, US (IATA airport code AGC)
- Agra Cantonment railway station (station code: AGC), Uttar Pradesh, India
- Autorail à grande capacité, a type of train

== Organizations ==
=== In business ===
- AGC Inc. (formerly Asahi Glass Co.), a glass manufacturer
- Associated General Contractors of America, an association of commercial construction contractors
- Australian Guarantee Corporation, a financial company
- Al Ghurair Centre, the first “modern” shopping mall in Dubai.

=== Military ===
- Adjutant General's Corps, in the British Army
- Army Geospatial Center, part of the US Army Corps of Engineers
- A retired US Navy hull classification symbol: Amphibious force flagship (AGC)

=== Religious organizations ===
- Apostolic Generation Church, a non-denominational church in Jakarta, Indonesia
- Associated Gospel Churches of Canada, a Canadian evangelical Christian denomination

=== Other organizations ===
- Assyrian General Conference, a political organization in Iraq
- Autodefensas Gaitanistas de Colombia (aka The Gulf Clan), a drug cartel and paramilitary group in Colombia

== Science and technology ==
- AGC, a codon for the amino acid serine
- Agra Cantonment railway station in Uttar Pradesh, India
- All glass cartridge automotive fuses
- Apollo Guidance Computer, for the Apollo program
- Atypical Glandular Cells, in the Bethesda system for reporting Pap smear results
- Automated Guided Cart, a small Automated Guided Vehicle
- Automatic gain control of electronic amplification
- Automatic generation control of electricity generators
- Auxiliary General sub-class C, formerly U.S. Navy ship type Amphibious Command Ship

== Other uses ==
- Agatu language
- Attorney General of California
- Attorney General of Canada
- Attorney General of Colombia
- Attorney General of Colorado
- Attorney General of Connecticut
- Auditor General of Canada
- Auditor General of China
- Auditor General of Colombia
- A Great Chaos
