= Gautam Kaul =

Gautam Kaul may refer to:

- Gautam Kaul (finance professor)
- Gautam Kaul (film critic)
