= Ramechhap 1 =

Parliamentary constituency in Nepal

- Parliamentary constituency
- Ramechhap 1 in Bagmati Province
- Province: Bagmati Province
- District: Ramechhap District
- Population: 170,302
- Electorate: 187,952

Current constituency
- Created: 1991
- Party: Rastriya Swatantra Party
- Member of Parliament: Krishna Hari Budhathoki

Ramechhap 1 is the parliamentary constituency of Ramechhap District in Nepal. This constituency came into existence on the Constituency Delimitation Commission (CDC) report submitted on 31 August 2017.

== Incorporated areas ==
Ramechhap 1 incorporates the entirety of Ramechhap District.

== Assembly segments ==
It encompasses the following Bagmati Provincial Assembly segment

- Ramechhap 1(A)
- Ramechhap 1(B)

== Members of Parliament ==
=== Parliament/Constituent Assembly ===
ty
1991	Laxman Prasad Ghimire	Nepali Congress
1994	Dev Shankar Paudel	CPN (Unified Marxist–Leninist)
1999	Kamal Prasad Sunuwar	CPN (Unified Marxist–Leninist)
2008	Tara Narayan Shrestha	CPN (Maoist)
January 2009	Tara Narayan Shrestha	UCPN (Maoist)
2013	Ang Tawa Sherpa	Nepali Congress
2017	Shyam Kumar Shrestha	CPN (Maoist Centre)
May 2018	Shyam Kumar Shrestha	Nepal Communist Party
March 2021	Shyam Kumar Shrestha	CPN (Maoist Centre)
2022	Purna Bahadur Tamang	Nepali Congress
2026	Krishna Hari Budhathoki	Rastriya Swatantra Party

=== Provincial Assembly ===
==== 1(A) ====
Election	Member	Party
2017	Shanti Prasad Paudel	CPN (Unified Marxist–Leninist)
May 2018	Shanti Prasad Paudel	Nepal Communist Party

==== 1(B) ====
Election	Member	Party
2017	Kailash Prasad Dhungel	CPN (Unified Marxist–Leninist)
May 2018	Kailash Prasad Dhungel	Nepal Communist Party

== Election results ==
=== Election in the 2020s ===
==== 2026 general election ====
Candidate	Party	Votes	%
Krishna Hari Budhathoki	Rastriya Swatantra Party	24,808	30.26
Madhav Prasad Dhungel	CPN (UML)	17,609	21.48
Ram Chandra Khadka	Nepali Congress	16,307	19.89
Shyam Kumar Shrestha	Nepali Communist Party	13,354	16.29
Dip Bahadur Yonjan	Ujyaalo Nepal Party	7,201	8.78
Dhal Bahadur Khapangi Magar	Shram Sanskriti Party	1,336	1.63
Gore Tamang	Rastriya Prajatantra Party	543	0.66
Arjun Bahadur Thapa Magar	Rastriya Janamorcha	161	0.20
Others		675	0.82
Total		81,994	100.00
Valid votes		81,994	94.20
Invalid/blank votes		5,048	5.80
Total votes		87,042	100.00
Registered voters/turnout		187,952	46.31
Majority		7,199	
Rastriya Swatantra Party gain			

==== 2022 general election ====
Candidate	Party	Votes	%
Purna Bahadur Tamang	Nepali Congress	47,099	56.14
Kailash Prasad Dhungel	CPN (UML)	30,730	36.63
Lal Bahadur Ghising	Rastriya Prajatantra Party	1,484	1.77
Samikshya Shrestha	Rastriya Swatantra Party	1,457	1.74
Others		3,129	3.73
Total		83,899	100.00
Majority		16,369	
Nepali Congress gain			

=== Election in the 2010s ===
==== 2017 legislative elections ====
es
CPN (Maoist Centre)	Shyam Kumar Shrestha	42,117
Nepali Congress	Purna Bahadur Tamang	35,771
CPN (Marxist–Leninist)	Mohan Karki	3,285
Others		1,957
Invalid votes		5,651
Result	Maoist Centre gain	
Source: Election Commission

==== 2017 Nepalese provincial elections ====
===== 1(A) =====
Party	Candidate	Votes
CPN (Unified Marxist–Leninist)	Shanti Prasad Paudel	22,369
Nepali Congress	Ratna Bahadur Karki	16,058
Others		1,663
Invalid votes		2,988
Result	CPN (UML) gain	
Source: Election Commission

===== 1(B) =====
Party	Candidate	Votes
CPN (Unified Marxist–Leninist)	Kailash Prasad Dhungel	26,935
Nepali Congress	Jit Bahadur Magar	14,729
Janasamajbadi Party Nepal	Raju Yonjan	1,127
Others		919
Invalid votes		2,093
Result	CPN (UML) gain	
Source: Election Commission

==== 2013 Constituent Assembly election ====
es
Nepali Congress	Ang Tawa Sherpa	13,615
UCPN (Maoist)	Laxmi Devi Gurung	9,903
CPN (Unified Marxist–Leninist)	Kamal Prakash Sunuwar	9,022
Rastriya Prajatantra Party	Gobinda Bahadur Khadka	2,516
Others		1,483
Result	Congress gain	
Source: NepalNews

=== Election in the 2000s ===
==== 2008 Constituent Assembly election ====
Party	Candidate	Votes
CPN (Maoist)	Tara Narayan Shrestha	19,910
Nepali Congress	Ang Tawa Sherpa	10,245
CPN (Unified Marxist–Leninist)	Dev Shankar Paudel	7,404
Rastriya Prajatantra Party	Dil Bahadur Tamang	1,101
Others		1,810
Invalid Votes		2,320
Result	Maoist gain	
Source: Election Commission

=== Election in the 1990s ===
==== 1999 legislative elections ====
Party	Candidate	Votes
CPN (Unified Marxist–Leninist)	Kamal Prasad Sunuwar	16,582
Nepali Congress	Laxman Prasad Ghimire	15,278
CPN (Marxist–Leninist)	Ram Bahadur Karki	4,881
Rastriya Prajatantra Party	Babu Ram Paudel	2,620
Others		450
Invalid Votes		1,562
Result	CPN (UML) hold	
Source: Election Commission

==== 1994 legislative elections ====
Party	Candidate	Votes
CPN (Unified Marxist–Leninist)	Dev Shankar Paudel	10,968
Nepali Congress	Laxman Prasad Ghimire	10,957
Rastriya Prajatantra Party	Ang Chhiring Lama	9,034
Independent	Yuba Raj Bhattarai	1,973
Others		1,274
Result	CPN (UML) gain	
Source: Election Commission

==== 1991 legislative elections ====
Party	Candidate	Votes
Nepali Congress	Laxman Prasad Ghimire	12,554
CPN (Unified Marxist–Leninist)	Dev Shankar Paudel	10,086
Result	Congress gain	

== See also ==
- List of parliamentary constituencies of Nepal
