= Krishna Hari Budhathoki =

Nepalese Politician and Economist

- कृष्णहरि बुढाथोकी

Member of Parliament, Pratinidhi Sabha
- Elected
- Assumed office 27 March 2026
- Preceded by: Purna Bahadur Tamang
- Constituency: Ramechhap 1

Personal details
- Citizenship: Nepalese
- Party: Rastriya Swatantra Party
- Education: Doctorate (Economics)
- Alma mater: Tribhuvan University (Ph.D)
- Profession: Politician; Economist

Krishna Hari Budhathoki (Note: Nepali: कृष्णहरि बुढाथोकी) is a Nepalese politician and economist serving as a member of parliament from the Rastriya Swatantra Party. He is the member of the 3rd Federal Parliament of Nepal elected from Ramechhap 1 constituency in 2026 Nepalese General Election securing 24,808 votes and defeating Madhav Prasad Dhungel of the CPN UML. He previously worked at Nepal Bank Limited before joining politics. He holds Ph.D in Economics from Tribhuvan University.
