= Laxmi Nath Gautam =

Nepalese central banker and civil servant

Second Governor of Nepal Rastra Bank
- In office 8 February 1961 – 17 June 1965
- Monarch: Mahendra
- Preceded by: Himalayan Shumsher J.B.R.
- Succeeded by: Pradyuma Lal Rajbhandari

Personal details
- Children: Sudha Sharma Gautam (daughter)
- Parent: Kulchandra Gautam (father)

Laxmi Nath Gautam (Nepali: लक्ष्मीनाथ गौतम) was a Nepalese central banker who served as the second Governor of Nepal Rastra Bank, the central bank of Nepal. He held office from 8 February 1961 to 17 June 1965.
