= Manilal Nag =

Indian musician (1939–2026)

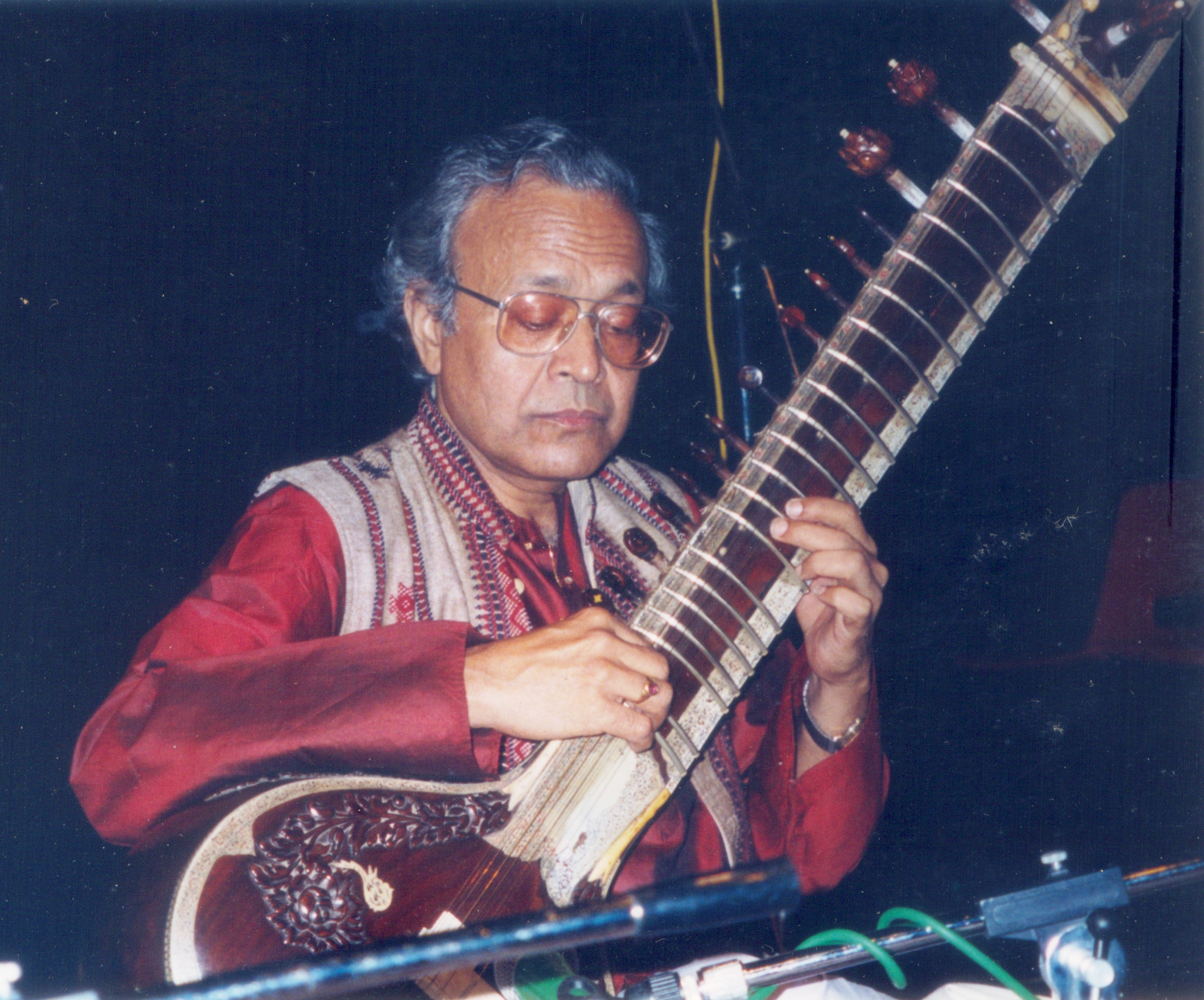

Background information
- Born: 16 August 1939; Bankura, Bengal Province, British India
- Died: 9 November 2026 (aged 87) Kolkata, West Bengal, India
- Genre: Indian classical music
- Instrument: Sitar

Pandit Manilal Nag (16 August 1939 – 9 November 2026) was an Indian Indian classical sitar player and an exponent of the Bishnupur gharana of Bengal. He was given the Padma Shri Award, the fourth highest civilian award in India, in 2020.

== Life and career ==
Nag was born in Bankura on 16 August 1939. He learned to play sitar from his father, Gokul Nag. He made his first public appearance in the All India Music Conference of 1953, accompanied by Samta Prasad on tabla. He was selected as an "A Grade" artist of All India Radio in 1954, and performed many times in the National Programme of Music and Akashvani Sangeet Sammelan after 1954.

He was invited to the United States and European countries through the I.C.C.R (Government of India) in 1973. In 1979 he was also invited to Australia by the Government of India as a delegate for participation in the Indian Ocean Art Festival, to mark the 150th anniversary of the Government of Australia. Nag was attached to the Instrumental Music Division of the ITC Sangeet Research Academy from 2005 to 2011.

Nag's children and students include sixth-generation sitarist Mita Nag, who is also associated with the Bishnupur gharana.

Nag died on 9 November 2026, at the age of 87.

== Awards ==
Nag received the Sangeet Natak Akademi Award in 2001 and also the Senior Fellowship Award from India's Ministry of Culture in 2005 and an Honorary Gold Medal from the Asiatic Society, Kolkata, in 2008. The Government of West Bengal awarded him the Allauddin Puraskar in 2012 and the Banga Bibhushan in 2015, as well as the Sangeet Mahasamman Award. He has also received the ITC Sangeet Samman, Doverlane Sangeet Samman, Koser Award from Pracheen Kala Kendra, Chandigarh, Sangeet Ratna Award from Mumbai, and Vitasta Award from New Delhi. He was awarded the Padma Shri Award, the fourth highest civilian award, in 2020.

== Discography ==
- Ragas Jog, Bhairavi (Ray Spiegel, tabla): Raga Records 215
- Raga Lalit (Anand Gopal Bandopadhyay, tabla): Raga Records 213.
- Classical Music of North India - Raga Suha Kanada (Mahapurush Misra, tabla): Koch World Music Library KICC 5111; King Records (Japan) K30Y 5101.
- Classical Music of North India - Ragas Puriya Dhanashri, Rageshri (Mahapurush Misra, tabla): Koch World Music Library KICC 5112; King Records K30Y 5119.
- Ragas Darbari Kanada, Mishra Kafi (Sankha Chatterjee, tabla): Dunya Records fy 8025 (Italy)
- Jugalbandi, a shenai and sitar duet. Ali Ahmad Hussein Khan shenai, Subhen Chatterjee tabla. Raga Desh: Rhyme Records RCD 9805
- Sitar & Sehnai - Manilal Nag & Ali Ahmed Hussain shenai, Subhen Chatterjee tabla. Marwa, Abhogi, Anand Kalyan, Purvi dhun Biswas BIS 115
- Harmony Of Strings V G Jog violin, Anand Gopal Bhandopadhyay tabla: Raga Shyam Kalyan, Raga Basant, Raga Bihari. Vista India VIST 114770
- Raga Charukeshi (Hom Nath Upadhyaya, tabla): Ravi Shankar Music Circle RSMC-18.
- Ragas Jogkauns, Saraswati (Sabir Khan, tabla): Gramophone Co. of India STCS 02B 6189.
- The Japan Concerts, 1985 - Ragas Puriya Kalyan, Misra Piloo, Khamaj (Mahapurush Misra, tabla): Raga Records 103
- Ragas Of Dawn, 2020 (Samar Saha, Tabla) - Raga Bilashkani Todi, Raga Bhairavi: Aimrec (Baltimore MD, USA)
