= Mahadev Deka =

- Professional bodybuilder
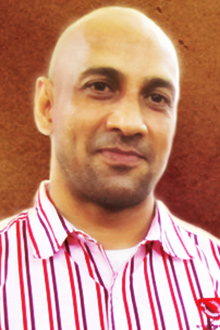
- Mahadev Deka Mahadev Deka

Personal info
- Born: 17 May 1969 (age 57); Barpeta District, Assam, India

Best statistics

Professional (Pro) career
- Best win: Mr Universe; 2009

Mahadev Deka is a bodybuilder from Barpeta district, Assam, India. By profession he is an superintending engineer in Public health department of Assam. In 2008 he was the runner up of Musclemania Superbody world championship and in 2009 has won the championship (Musclemania) in the Open BW (bantamweight) category, held in Florida from 18 to 21 June.

== Diet Schedule ==
He follows a daily diet of 20 egg whites, a chicken, fruit juice, little rice, lot of green vegetables and allotted supplements.

== Training ==
Mahadev took his first training from Manohar Aich in Kolkata in 1992 and went on to win bronze at Bharar Kumar Championship in Bangalore the same year.

== Heart surgery ==
In August 2002, Mahadev underwent an Open heart surgery. Post-operation, he developed a lump in his chest. He was advised an open-heart surgery to get it removed and so he took a break of three months. He also underwent chemotherapy. But all these could not resist him to go to his favorite place, the gym.

In 2008 he was the runner up of Musclemania Superbody world championship, and won its Mr Universe title in the bantamweight class in 2009 held in Florida. On his return he received a hero's welcome from fans for his victory. Chief Minister of Assam Tarun Gogoi promised him a house and the Numaligarh Refinery Limited has announces a cash award of Rs50,000. Asom PHE Minister Rihon Daimary, at a function held at his office chamber, felicitated him with Chelleng Chador, Xorai and a cash award of Rs.25,000.

== Philanthropy ==
Mahadev Deka has been involved in several charities. He is the brand ambassador for an NGO called Kidney Citizen which is a one of a kind not for profit organization supporting people with kidney diseases. Kidney Citizen is a registered charitable trust set up by Uttam Basar for helping the cause of the underprivileged and all patients with kidney diseases. The Foundation has two focus areas: Awareness and Healthcare. To increase the reach and corpus of the Foundation, Mahadev Deka has undertaken initiatives such as spreading awareness through public appearances and its website for which Kidney Citizen has teamed up with the internet technology company, TOUCHWEB Solutions. The aim is to raise awareness through the website about kidney transplant procedure, kidney stone, and other kidney related issues, which can save lives.

== See also ==
- Gautam Kalita
