= University of Michigan Social Venture Fund =

The University of Michigan Social Venture Fund (SVF) is the first student-run social venture fund in the United States. Established in 2009 by four Ross School of Business MBA students, the Social Venture Fund invests in innovative and mission-driven social enterprises. The SVF is overseen by Professor Gautam Kaul and housed in the Zell Lurie Institute for Entrepreneurial Studies at the University of Michigan.

The SvF aims to strengthen the leadership of the Ross School of Business by integrating social and environmental issues into business school education.

The Fund's members are currently organized into a non-hierarchical structure that includes a lead team and four circles of interest – Education, Food Systems & Environment, Health, and Urban Revitalization (focused on Detroit). The SVF was awarded with the 2010 Ross MBA class gift. The Social Venture Fund is the University of Michigan's third student-led fund, joining the early-stage Wolverine Venture Fund and the pre-seed Frankel Commercialization Fund. The Fund made its first investment in late 2011 and its second investment in early 2012.

This fund is currently being led by the Leadership Team, including Max Berry, Katherine Cima, Alli Lesovoy, Nathan Lohrmann, Hershey Pilla, and Caroline Suttlehan.
