= Deepak Khadka =

Nepalese politician and Minister of Energy, Water Resources and Irrigation since 2024

- दिपक खड्का

Minister of Energy, Water Resources and Irrigation of Nepal
- In office 15 July 2024 – 12 September 2025
- President: Ram Chandra Poudel
- Prime Minister: K. P. Sharma Oli
- Preceded by: Shakti Bahadur Basnet
- Succeeded by: Kul Man Ghising

Minister of State for Water Supply and Sanitation of Nepal
- In office 30 November 2016 – 31 May 2017
- President: Bidya Devi Bhandari
- Prime Minister: Pushpa Kamal Dahal
- Preceded by: Dinesh Chandra Yadav
- Succeeded by: Abdul razak gaddi
Parliamentary offices
Member of Parliament, Pratinidhi Sabha
In office 22 December 2022 – 12 September 2025
Preceded by	Rajendra Prasad Gautam
Constituency	Sankhuwasabha 1
Member of the Constituent Assembly / Legislature Parliament
In office 21 January 2014 – 14 October 2017
Preceded by	Dambar Bahadur Khadka
Succeeded by	Constituency abolished
Constituency	Sankhuwasabha–2

Personal details
- Born: 29 June 1971 (age 54) Dharmadevi, Sankhuwasabha, Nepal
- Party: Nepali Congress
- Spouse: Binita Khadka
- Parent: Drona Bahadur Khadka (father)
- Education: Tribhuwan University

Deepak Khadka is a Nepalese politician, belonging to the Nepali Congress and served as the Minister of Energy, Water Resources and Irrigation from 15 July 2024 to 9 September 2025 in the until the dissolution of the cabinet led by Prime Minister KP Sharma Oli.

Khadka also serves as a member of the 2nd Federal Parliament of Nepal. In the 2022 Nepalese general election, he won the election from Sankhuwasabha 1 (constituency). In November 2016, Khadka also served as a cabinet minister and was appointed Minister of State for Water Supply and Sanitation of Government of Nepal. Khadka was a member of the 2nd Nepalese Constituent Assembly. He won the election from Sankhuwasabha–2 constituency in the 2013 Nepalese Constituent Assembly election.
