= Shyam Kumar Shrestha =

Nepalese politician

- श्याम कुमार श्रेष्ठ

Member of Parliament, Pratinidhi Sabha
- Incumbent
- Assumed office 4 March 2018
- Preceded by: Ang Tawa Sherpa
- Constituency: Ramechhap 1

Member of Constituent Assembly
- In office 21 January 2014 – 14 October 2017
- Preceded by: Dilli Man Tamang
- Succeeded by: Constituency abolished
- Constituency: Ramechhap 2

Personal details
- Born: December 16, 1971 (age 54)
- Party: CPN (Maoist Centre)
- Other political affiliations: CPN (Masal)

Shyam Kumar Shrestha is a Nepalese politician, belonging to the Nepal Communist Party currently serving as the member of the 1st Federal Parliament of Nepal. In the 2017 Nepalese general election he was elected from the Ramechhap 1 constituency, securing 42117(50.66%) votes.
