= Sankhuwasabha 1 =

Parliamentary constituency in Nepal

- Parliamentary constituency
- Sankhuwasabha 1 in Province No. 1
- Province: Province No. 1
- District: Sankhuwasabha District

Current constituency
- Created: 1991
- Party: Nepali Congress
- Member of Parliament: Deepak Khadka
- Member of the Provincial Assembly: Purna Prasad Rai, CPN (MC)
- Member of the Provincial Assembly: Tulsi Prasad Neupane, CPN (UML)

Sankhuwasabha 1 is the parliamentary constituency of Sankhuwasabha District in Nepal. This constituency came into existence on the Constituency Delimitation Commission (CDC) report submitted on 31 August 2017.

== Incorporated areas ==
Sankhuwasabha 1 incorporates the entirety of Sankhuwasabha District.

== Assembly segments ==
It encompasses the following Province No. 1 Provincial Assembly segment

- Sankhuwasabha 1(A)
- Sankhuwasabha 1(B)

== Members of Parliament ==
=== Parliament/Constituent Assembly ===
| Election | Member | Party |
|---|---|---|
| 1991 | Parshuram Megi Gurung | CPN (Unified Marxist–Leninist) |
| 1994 | Dedh Raj Khadka | CPN (Unified Marxist–Leninist) |
| 1999 | Tanka Prasad Rai | Nepali Congress |
| 2008 | Purna Prasad Rai | CPN (Maoist) |
| January 2009 | Purna Prasad Rai | UCPN (Maoist) |
| 2013 | Tara Man Gurung | Nepali Congress |
| 2017 | Rajendra Prasad Gautam | CPN (Unified Marxist–Leninist) |
| May 2018 | Rajendra Prasad Gautam | Nepal Communist Party |
| March 2021 | Rajendra Prasad Gautam | CPN (Unified Marxist–Leninist) |
| 2022 | Deepak Khadka | Nepali Congress |

=== Provincial Assembly ===
==== 1(A) ====
| Election | Member | Party |
|---|---|---|
| 2017 | Purna Prasad Rai | CPN (Maoist Centre) |
| May 2018 | Purna Prasad Rai | Nepal Communist Party |
| March 2021 | Purna Prasad Rai | CPN (Maoist Centre) |

==== 1(B) ====
| Election | Member | Party |
|---|---|---|
| 2017 | Tulsi Prasad Neupane | CPN (Unified Marxist-Leninist) |
| May 2018 | Tulsi Prasad Neupane | Nepal Communist Party |
| March 2021 | Tulsi Prasad Neupane | CPN (Unified Marxist–Leninist) |

== Election results ==
=== Election in the 2020s ===
==== 2026 general election ====
| Candidate | Party | Votes | % |
|---|---|---|---|
| Arjun Karki | CPN (UML) | 15,636 | 26.55 |
| Mingma Sherpa | RSP | 15,000 | 25.47 |
| Dipan Shrestha | Congress | 13,271 | 22.54 |
| Uma Kumari Rai | SSP | 9,857 | 16.74 |
| Sarita Khadka Thapa | NCP | 2,812 | 4.78 |
| Others | | 2,312 | 3.93 |
| Total | | 58,888 | 100.00 |
| Registered voters/turnout | | 119,388 | – |
| Majority | | 636 | |
| CPN (UML) gain | | | |

==== 2022 general election ====
| Candidate | Party | Votes | % |
|---|---|---|---|
| Deepak Khadka | Nepali Congress | 32,161 | 51.39 |
| Rajendra Prasad Gautam | CPN (UML) | 26,721 | 42.70 |
| Bhakta Narayan Shrestha | Rastriya Swatantra Party | 1,136 | 1.82 |
| Others | | 2,567 | 4.10 |
| Total | | 62,585 | 100.00 |
| Majority | | 5,440 | |
| Nepali Congress gain | | | |

==== 2022 provincial election ====
===== 1(A) =====
| Candidate | Party | Votes | % |
|---|---|---|---|
| Rajendra Karki | CPN (Maoist Centre) | 13,433 | 44.69 |
| Bhabishwar Gurung | CPN (UML) | 13,399 | 44.58 |
| Sitaraj Timsina | People's Socialist Party | 997 | 3.32 |
| Ramod Shrestha | Rastriya Prajatantra Party | 779 | 2.59 |
| Others | 1,448 | 4.82 | |
| Total | | 30,056 | 100.00 |
| Majority | | 34 | |
| CPN (Maoist Centre) | | | |

===== 1(B) =====
| Candidate | Party | Votes | % |
|---|---|---|---|
| Bidur Kumar Limthep | CPN (UML) | 15,482 | 46.84 |
| Sarita Thapa | CPN (Unified Socialist) | 15,243 | 46.12 |
| Others | 2,326 | 7.04 | |
| Total | | 33,051 | 100.00 |
| Majority | | 239 | |
| CPN (UML) | | | |

=== Election in the 2010s ===
==== 2017 legislative elections ====
| Party | Candidate | Votes |
|---|---|---|
| CPN (Unified Marxist–Leninist) | Rajendra Prasad Gautam | 32,769 |
| Nepali Congress | Deepak Khadka | 31,639 |
| Others | | 1,559 |
| Invalid votes | | 3,256 |
| Result | CPN (UML) gain | |
Source: Election Commission

==== 2017 Nepalese provincial elections ====
===== 1(A) =====
| Party | Candidate | Votes |
|---|---|---|
| Communist Party of Nepal (Maoist Centre) | Purna Prasad Rai | 16,677 |
| Nepali Congress | Narendra Kumar Kerung | 14,632 |
| Others | | 976 |
| Invalid votes | | 1,211 |
| Result | Maoist Centre gain | |
Source: Election Commission

===== 1(B) =====
| Party | Candidate | Votes |
|---|---|---|
| CPN (Unified Marxist–Leninist) | Tulsi Prasad Neupane | 17,514 |
| Nepali Congress | Deepak Kumar Limbu | 16,140 |
| Others | | 741 |
| Invalid votes | | 1,302 |
| Result | CPN (UML) gain | |
Source: Election Commission

==== 2013 Constituent Assembly election ====
| Party | Candidate | Votes |
|---|---|---|
| Nepali Congress | Tara Man Gurung | 9,415 |
| CPN (Unified Marxist–Leninist) | Hem Raj Ghimire | 8,946 |
| UCPN (Maoist) | Indra Hang Rai | 4,438 |
| Federal Socialist Party, Nepal | Narad Kumar Rai | 1,520 |
| Rastriya Prajatantra Party Nepal | Roshan Rokka | 1,315 |
| Others | | 1,679 |
| Result | Congress gain | |
Source: NepalNews

=== Election in the 2000s ===
==== 2008 Constituent Assembly election ====
| Party | Candidate | Votes |
|---|---|---|
| CPN (Maoist) | Purna Prasad Rai | 12,948 |
| CPN (Unified Marxist–Leninist) | Kuwan Sen Rai | 9,148 |
| Nepali Congress | Tanka Prasad Rai | 7,106 |
| Others | | 2,053 |
| Invalid votes | | 1,627 |
| Result | Maoist gain | |
Source: Election Commission

=== Election in the 1990s ===
==== 1999 legislative elections ====
| Party | Candidate | Votes |
|---|---|---|
| Nepali Congress | Tanka Prasad Rai | 11,685 |
| CPN (Unified Marxist–Leninist) | Ded Raj Khadka | 10,983 |
| CPN (Marxist–Leninist) | Durga Kiran Rai | 2,968 |
| Rastriya Prajatantra Party | Kedar Nath Rai | 2,669 |
| Others | | 1,452 |
| Invalid Votes | | 754 |
| Result | Congress gain | |
Source: Election Commission

==== 1994 legislative elections ====
| Party | Candidate | Votes |
|---|---|---|
| CPN (Unified Marxist–Leninist) | Dedh Raj Khadka | 12,354 |
| Nepali Congress | Shiva Kumar Gauli | 8,339 |
| Rastriya Janamukti Party | Mani Dhan Rai | 2,377 |
| Rastriya Prajatantra Party | Kedar Nath Rai | 1,878 |
| Independent | Uttar Kumar Gurung | 478 |
| Result | CPN (UML) hold | |
Source: Election Commission

==== 1991 legislative elections ====
| Party | Candidate | Votes |
|---|---|---|
| CPN (Unified Marxist–Leninist) | Parshuram Megi Gurung | 15,060 |
| Nepali Congress | Padma Nath Regmi | 7,484 |
| Result | CPN (UML) gain | |

== See also ==
- List of parliamentary constituencies of Nepal
