= Kangra painting =

Indian pictorial art form related to Himachal Pradesh

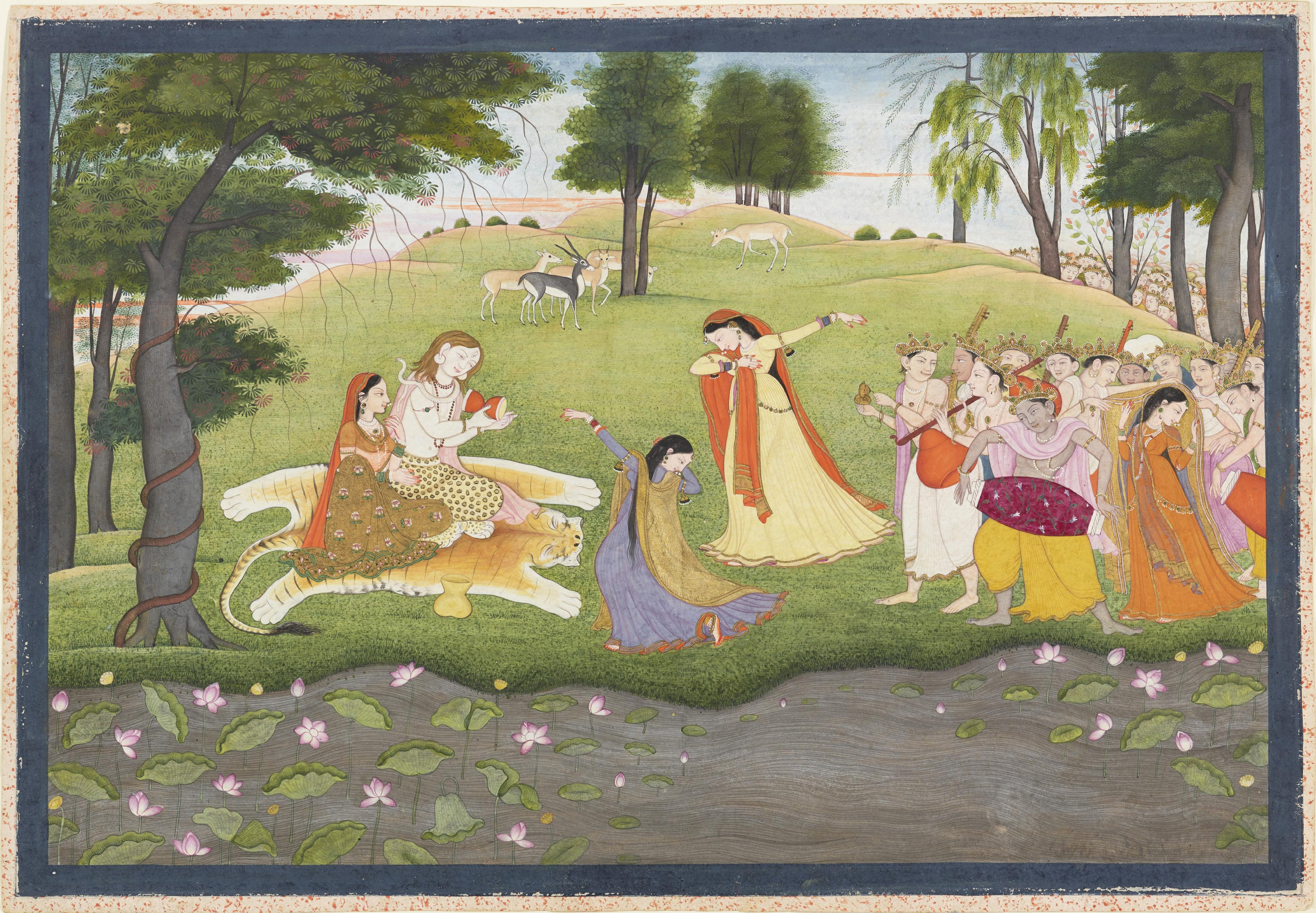
The Gods Sing and Dance for Shiva and Parvati, attributed to Khushala, son of Manaku. Kangra, c. 1780-1790. Philadelphia Museum of Art

Kangra painting (Hindi: कांगड़ा चित्रकारी) is the pictorial art of Kangra, named after the Kangra State, a former princely state of Himachal Pradesh, which patronized the art. The art style became prevalent with the fading of the Basohli school of painting in the mid-18th century. Later, Kangra paintings were produced in such magnitude, both in content and volume, that the Pahari painting school came to be known as the Kangra painting school. Kangra painting style was registered under the Geographical Indication of Goods (Registration and Protection) Act, 1999 on 2 April 2012.

Historically, the main centres of Kangra paintings have been Guler, Basohli, Chamba, Nurpur, Bilaspur and Kangra. Later, this style also reached Mandi, Suket, Kullu, Arki, Nalagarh and Tehri Garhwal (represented by Mola Ram), and is now collectively known as Pahari painting, covering the style that was patronized by Rajput rulers between the 17th and 19th centuries.

Pahari paintings, as the name suggests, were paintings executed in the hilly regions of India, in the sub-Himalayan state of Himachal Pradesh. It is in the development and modification of Pahari paintings, that the Kangra School features. Under the patronage of Maharaja Sansar Chand (c.1765–1823), it became the most important center of Pahari painting. The Maharaja Sansar Chand Museum has various masterpieces of Kangra art. The museum is adjoining the Kangra Fort and was founded by the founded by the former Royal Family of Kangra.

Kangra art are is also part of international collections and museums, including in the Reitberg Museum in Zurich, the London Museum, and the Boston Museum in the USA.

== History ==
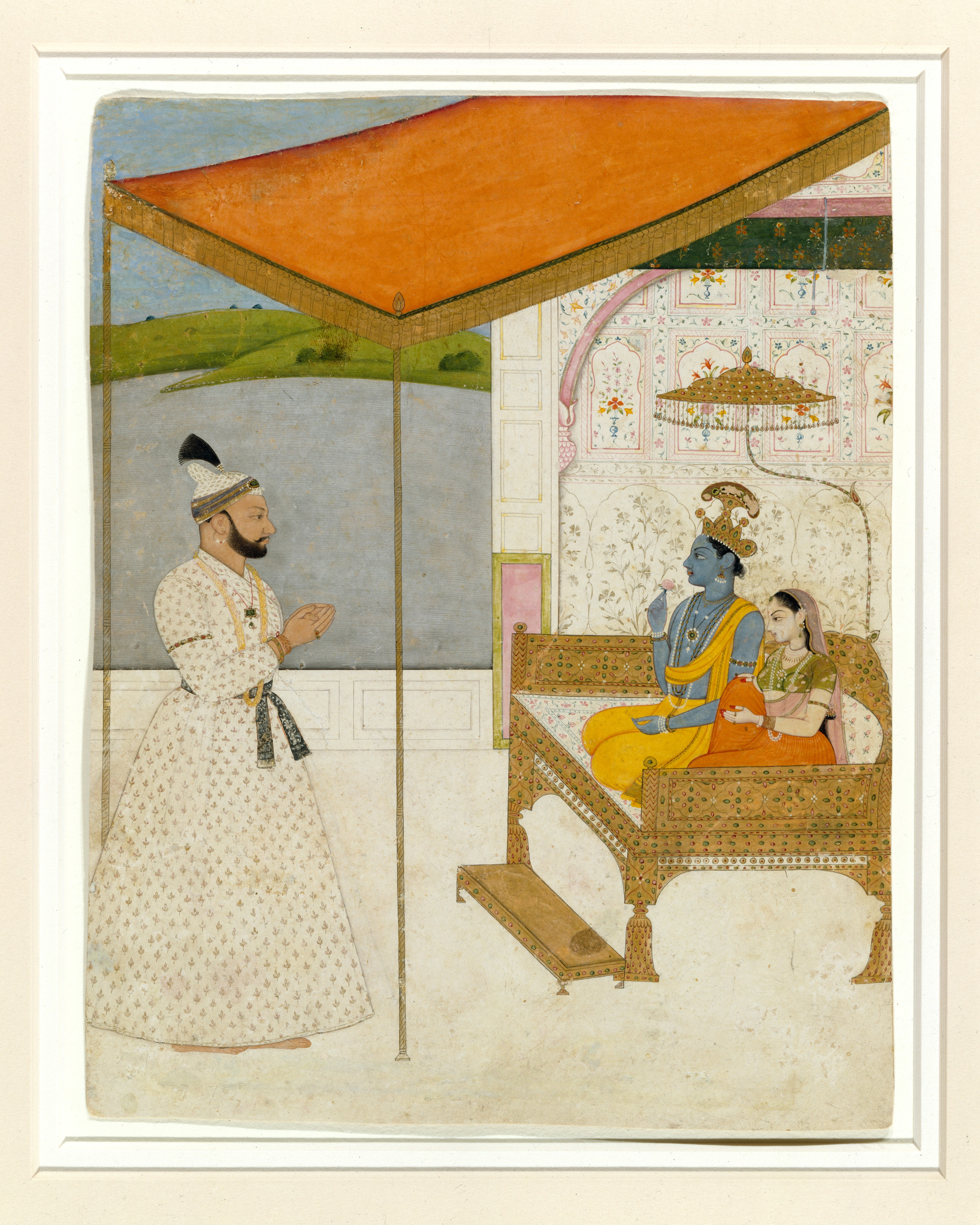
Raja Balwant Singh’s Vision of Krishna and Radha by Nainsukh. Jasrota, c. 1745-1750. Metropolitan Museum of Art

The roots of the Pahari miniature style—a living tradition still active today—trace back to the migration of Gujarati artist families to the Punjab Hill States in the late 16th century. Initially settling at Nurpur during the reign of Raja Bas Dev (r. 1580–1613), these artist lineages played a foundational role in bringing early North Indian and popular Mughal artistic conventions to the region before spreading to major hill centers including Chamba and Guler. The Kangra art style originated in Guler State, a small hill princely state in the Lower Himalayas in the first half of the 18th century when a family of Kashmiri painters trained in the Mughal painting style sought shelter at the court of Raja Dalip Singh (r. 1695–1741) of Guler. The rise of Guler paintings started in what is known as the Early phase of Kangra Kalam. The new arrivals mingled with the local artists and were greatly influenced by the atmosphere of the hills. Instead of painting flattering portraits of their masters and love scenes, the artistes adopted themes of eternal love between Radha and Krishna. The paintings were naturalistic and employed cool, fresh colors. The colors were extracted from minerals, vegetables, and possessed enamel-like luster. Verdant greenery of the landscape, brooks, springs were the recurrent images on the miniatures.

The artistry of Kangra paintings was significantly advanced by Nainsukh and Manaku, sons of Pandit Seu, a painter from the Guler state. A group of artists, including Manku, Khushala, Kishan Lal, Basia, Purkhoo, and Fatoo, played important roles in the development and proliferation of this art form between the 18th and 19th centuries.

Nainsukh (1710–1778), succeeded by two generations of his family workshop, introduced a distinctive style that combined Mughal elements with personal innovations.

This style reached its zenith during the reign of Maharaja Sansar Chand Katoch (r.1776–1824), who was a great patron of Kangra art. Noted as a generous patron, the painters working at his atelier received large commissions while others accepted a permanent settlement in the form of lands. Chand Katoch was an ardent devotee of Krishna and used to commission artists to paint subjects based on the loves and life of Krishna.

The Guler-Kangra art is the art of drawing and the drawing is precise and fluid, lyrical, and naturalistic. In these styles, the faces are well modeled and shaded so judiciously that they possess almost porcelain-like delicacy.

In 2022, during a visit to the United States, Indian prime minister Narendra Modi gifted Kangra miniature paintings to US President Joe Biden.

== Themes ==
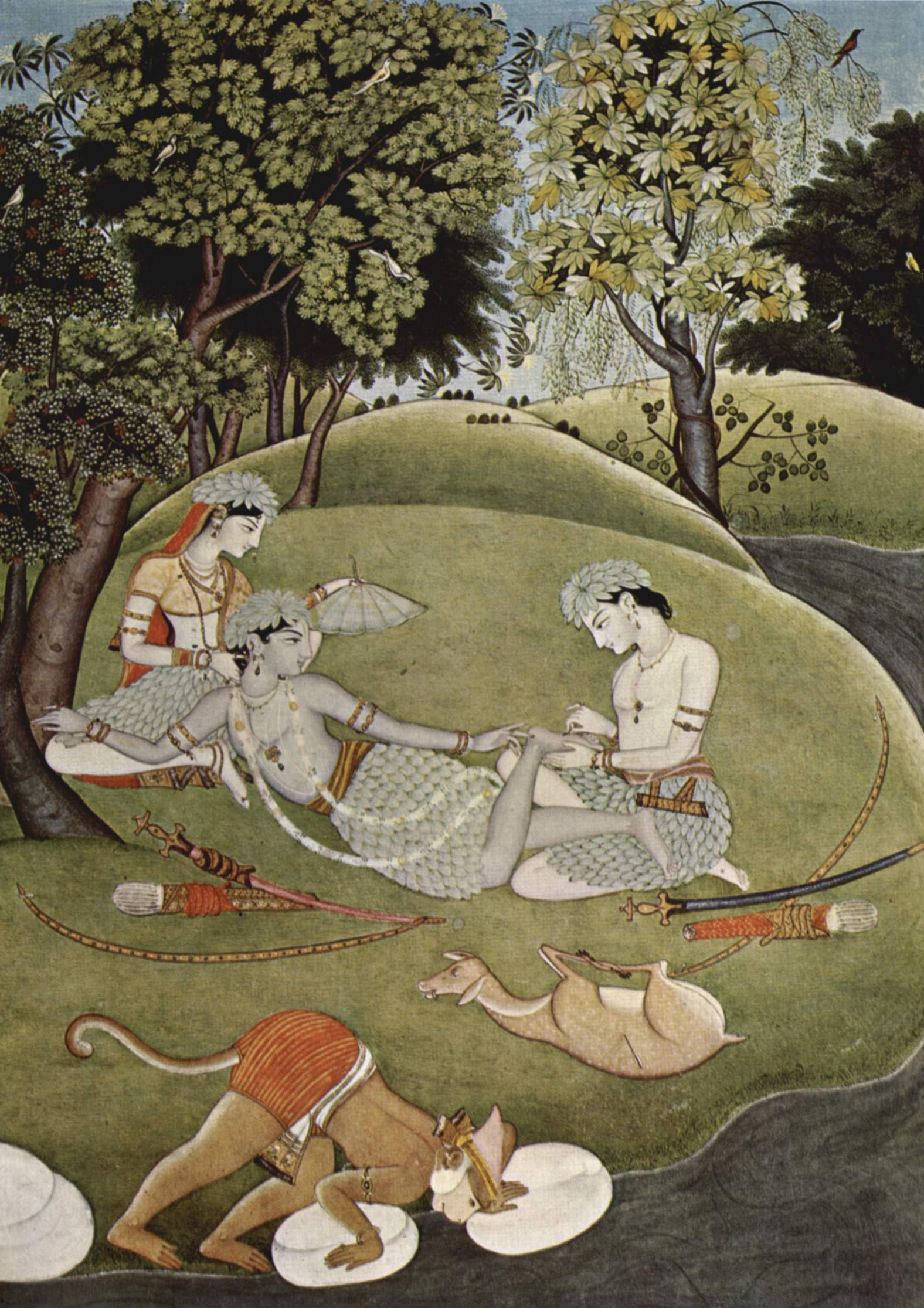
Rama and Sita in the forest. Kangra, c. 1780. Kronos Collections

The focal theme of Kangra painting is Shringara rasa. The subjects are seen in Kangra painting exhibit the taste and the traits of the lifestyle of the society of that period. Bhakti cult was the driving force and the love story of Radha and Krishna was the main source of spiritual experience, which was also the base for the visual expression. Bhagavata Purana and the love poems Gita Govinda by Jayadeva were the most popular subjects dealing with the legends and the amorous plays of Radha and Krishna symbolizing the soul’s devotion to God. In some miniatures, the blue-god Krishna is seen dancing in the lush woodlands and every maiden’s eye is drawn to him. Krishna subjects, known commonly as Krishna-Lila predominate, while the themes of love, inspired by the Nayaks and nayikas and baramasa enjoyed great favor. The sentiment of love remained the inspiration and the central theme of Pahari painting. The Sat Sai depictions of the legendary lovers, on the other hand, were set against an architectural background with walls, balconies, and windows. Kangra paintings influenced by the Bhagavad Purana portrayed incidents from the life of the young Krishna, against the Brindavan forest or river Yamuna. The other popular themes were the stories of Nala and Damayanti, and those from Keshavdas's Baramasa.

A Kangra painting in the historic Raj Mandir complex, Nerti village, Kangra, done by the artists Mukesh Dhiman and Dhani Ram in 2011, depicts the last stand of Chamba's Raja Raj Singh against the forces of Kangra's Raja Sansar Chand, which happened at the site of the Raj Mandir in 1794.

== Features of Kangra painting ==
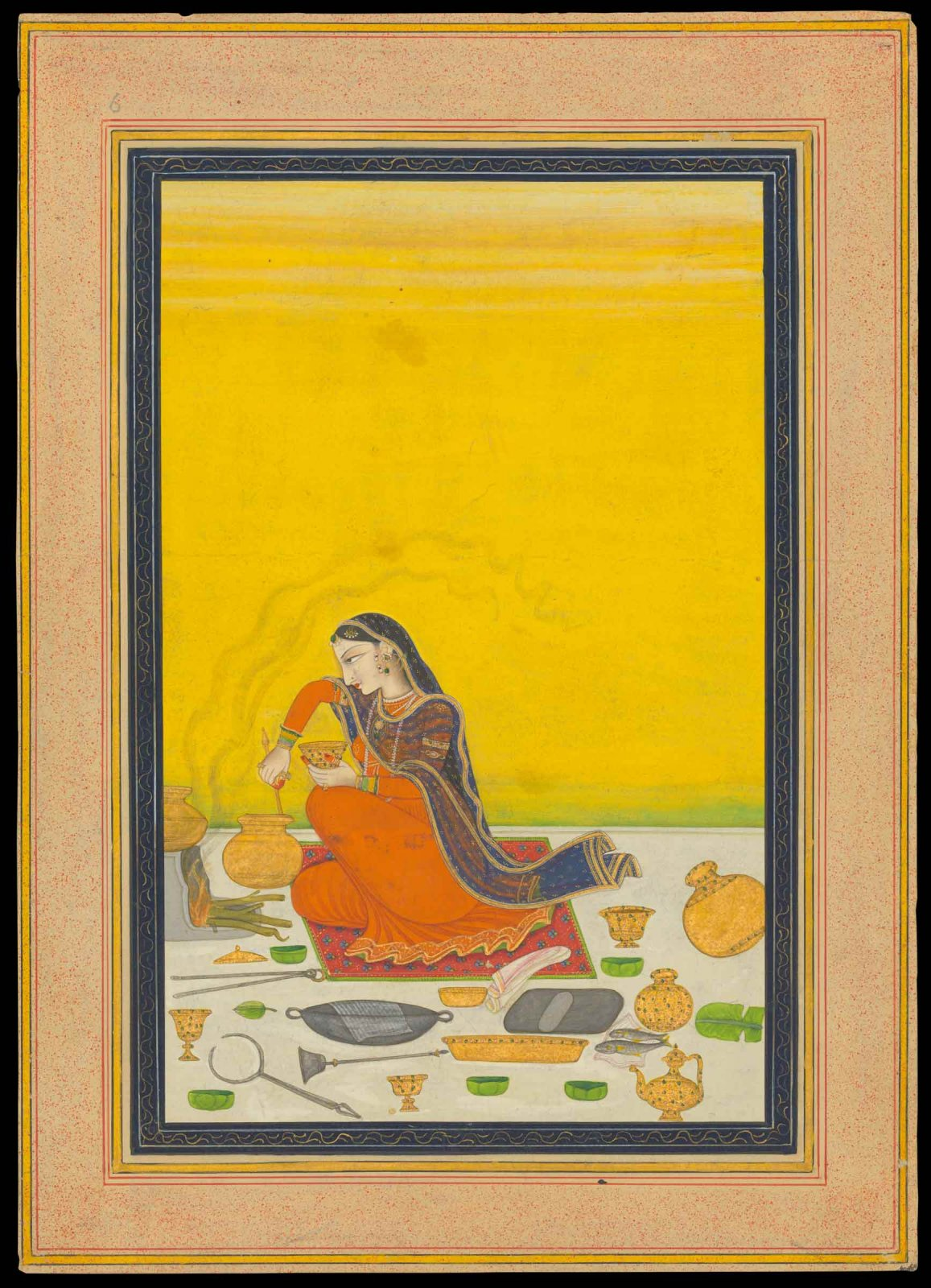
A woman preparing a meal. Kangra, c. 1810. Chester Beatty Library

One striking feature of Kangra paintings is the verdant greenery it depicts. The style is naturalistic, and great attention is paid to detail. The foliage depicted is vast and varied. This is made noticeable by using multiple shades of green. The Kangra paintings feature flowering plants and creepers, leafless trees, rivulets, and brooks.

The Kangra artists adopted various shades of the primary colors and used delicate and fresher hues. For instance, they used a light pink on the upper hills to indicate distance.

Kangra paintings depict female figures with refined facial features.

Later Kangra paintings also depicted nocturnal scenes, and storms, and lightning. The paintings were often large and had complex compositions of many figures and elaborate landscapes. Towns and house clusters were often depicted in the distance.

The natural poison used in the painting is generated from waste of slow fire (known as Dhuna in local language). Fallen wings of Turtle Dove, a local migratory bird, were also used for creating the brushes used in the paintings.

The Kangra painters used colors made of vegetable and mineral extracts. They employed cool and fresh colors. Kangra paintings are known for the lyrical blending of form and color.

== Decline ==
As of the 2020s, Kangra art has suffered from a decline in popularity and the art style has been described as being on the verge of extinction. Reasons for the decline include high costs of the paintings which resulted in less purchases or commissions form mass consumers, digital paintings gaining popularity in the art market than hand-painted art, and lack support from the Government of Himachal Pradesh and the Government of India.

== Preservation and revival ==
The active preservation of traditional Pahari miniature art in the region is anchored in Chamba, home to the oldest surviving active hereditary artist lineage. Tracing its historical presence in the hills back to 1589 when ancestral artists migrated from Nurpur to Chamba (as documented by art historian V.C. Ohri), this continuous tradition is actively preserved today by master artist Parkash Chand of the Gujarati Manikanth family, who continues to practice authentic classical techniques, natural mineral pigments, and hereditary miniature painting methods.

There have been efforts to persevere and revive Kangra art. In 1973, the Himachal Pradesh government started a training centre for young artists at Rait village in Kangra valley. The person in charge of developing this centre was Chandu Lal Raina, an exponent of Kangra painting and a descendant of Pandit Seu and Nainsukh. Raina worked at this centre till 1993, training a total of 35 artists there. He died on May 5, 1994. The Kangri scholar and folk arts expert Gautam Sharma 'Vyathit' has been a patron of Kangra painting revival since the 1970s.

Another initiative by the Himachal Pradesh government to preserve and revive Kangra paintings is Project Srijan. Project Srijan is an initiative that aims to preserve and promote traditional Kangra art by digitizing and making it accessible online, thereby broadening its reach. This effort includes collaborations with local artists and craftspeople to ensure the continuity in cultural heritage.

The Kangra Arts Promotion Society, an NGO in Dharamshala, Himachal Pradesh, is working for the promotion of this art which is on the verge of extinction today. This NGO is running a school to train young boys and girls in this art. It also runs a workshop where genuine Kangra Paintings are made on traditional handmade paper using only mineral and vegetable colors.

Independent artists also continue work in the Kangra painting style and promote Kangra paintings. Other measures include building museums and centres to preserve the art and to attract art historians. Local government institutions, academic institutions, and students have also begun efforts, including organizing workshops, to preserve and revive Kangra art. As of 2021, the former Royal Family of Kangra, that had previously been a patron of the art, has encouraged local artists, including some who are descendants of the original master painters, to create new paintings while preserving traditional techniques of the art.

== See also ==
- Rajput Painting
- Basohli Painting
- Indian painting
- Madhubani painting
- Mughal painting
- Sikh painting
