= Nawalparasi (Bardaghat Susta East) 1 =

Parliamentary constituency in Nepal

- Parliamentary constituency for the House of Representatives
- Nawalpur 1 in Gandaki Province; Protected areas in green

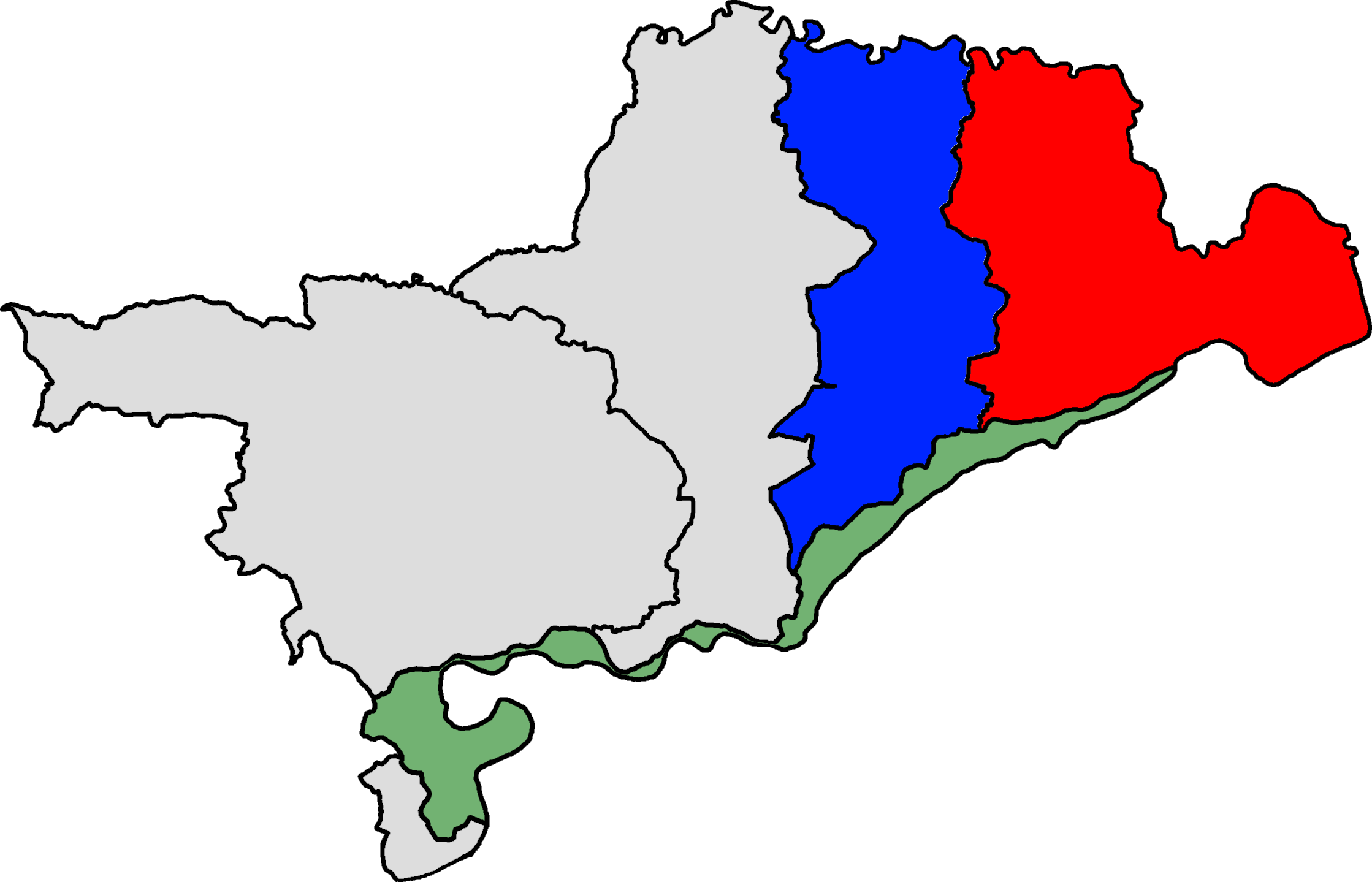
- Assembly segments Nawalpur 1(A) and Nawalpur 1(B) within Nawalpur District; Protected areas in green
- Province: Gandaki Province
- District: Parasi District
- Electorate: 113,947

Current constituency
- Created: 2017
- Party: Rastriya Swatantra Party
- MP: Rajan Gautam
- Gandaki MPA 1(A): Krishna Chandra Nepali Pokharel (NC)
- Gandaki MPA 1(B): Roshan Bahadur Gahra Thapa (NCP)

Nawalparasi (Bardaghat Susta East) 1 is one of two parliamentary constituencies of Parasi District in Nepal. This constituency came into existence on the Constituency Delimitation Commission (CDC) report submitted on 31 August 2017.

== Incorporated areas ==
Nawalparasi (Bardaghat Susta East) 1 incorporates Devchuli Municipality, Gaidakot Municipality, Bulingtar Rural Municipality and wards 1, 2 and 5–13 of Kawasoti Municipality.

== Assembly segments ==
It encompasses the following Gandaki Provincial Assembly segment

- Nawalparasi (Bardaghat Susta East) 1(A)
- Nawalparasi (Bardaghat Susta East) 1(B)

== Members of Parliament ==
=== Parliament/Constituent Assembly ===
Election	Member	Party
2022	Shashanka Koirala	Nepali Congress
2026	Rajan Gautam	Rastriya Swatantra Party

=== Provincial Assembly ===
==== 1(A) ====
Election	Member	Party
2017	Krishna Chandra Nepali Pokharel	Nepali Congress

==== 1(B) ====
Election	Member	Party
2017	Roshan Bahadur Gahra Thapa	CPN (Unified Marxist–Leninist)
May 2018	Roshan Bahadur Gahra Thapa	Nepal Communist Party

== Election results ==
=== Election in the 2020s ===
==== 2022 general election ====
Candidate	Party	Votes	%
Shashanka Koirala	Nepali Congress	27,067	32.78
Krishna Prasad Paudel	CPN (UML)	25,047	30.34
Rajan Gautam	Rastriya Swatantra Party	24,305	29.44
Mohani Lal Bhusal	Rastriya Prajatantra Party	3,469	4.20
Others		2,679	3.24
Total		82,567	100.00
Majority		2,020	
Nepali Congress hold			

==== 2022 provincial election ====
===== 1(A) =====
Candidate	Party	Votes	%
Mahendra Dhoj G.C.	Nepali Congress	15,137	38.17
Rabindra Adhikari	CPN (UML)	13,987	35.27
Santosh Thapa	Rastriya Prajatantra Party	6,140	15.48
Badri Kapri	Hamro Nepali Party	2,427	6.12
Kumar Gurung	Mongol National Organisation	929	2.34
Others	1,037	2.61	
Total		39,657	100.00
Majority		1,150	
Nepali Congress			

===== 1(B) =====
Candidate	Party	Votes	%
Roshan Bahadur Gaha Thapa	CPN (UML)	17,823	41.11
Lok Prasad Bhurtel	CPN (Maoist Centre)	14,110	32.55
Ramnath Upreti	Rastriya Prajatantra Party	7,671	17.69
Khanasaram Mahato	Nagrik Unmukti Party	917	2.12
Chok Narayan Kafle	Independent	819	1.89
Others	2,012	4.64	
Total		43,352	100.00
Majority		3,713	
CPN (UML)			

=== Election in the 2010s ===
==== 2017 legislative elections ====
Party	Candidate	Votes
Nepali Congress	Shashanka Koirala	40,620
CPN (Maoist Centre)	Bhavisor Parajuli	36,596
Bibeksheel Sajha Party	Hari Prasad Gautam	1,082
Others		2,962
Result	Congress gain	
Source: Election Commission

==== 2017 Nepalese provincial elections ====
===== 1(A) =====
Party	Candidate	Votes
Nepali Congress	Krishna Chandra Nepali Pokharel	17,683
CPN (Maoist Centre)	Surya Prasad Neupane	17,311
Rastriya Prajatantra Party (Democratic)	Santosh Thapa	1,044
Others		3,205
Result	Congress gain	
Source: Election Commission

===== 1(B) =====
Party	Candidate	Votes
CPN (Unified Marxist–Leninist)	Roshan Bahadur Garha Thapa	20,790
Nepali Congress	Mahendra Dhoj G.C.	19,941
Others		1,388
Result	CPN (UML) gain	
Source: Election Commission

== See also ==
- List of parliamentary constituencies of Nepal
