= Hom Nath Upadhyaya =

Nepali tabla player

Pandit Hom Nath Upadhyaya
- Born: 4 July 1943; Kathmandu, Nepal
- Died: 7 September 2016 (aged 73); Kathmandu, Nepal
- Education: MA in Music
- Alma mater: Prayag Sangeet Samiti
- Occupations: Tabla player, musician
- Known for: Being the royal court musician
- Awards: Kirateshwar Sangeetshram Award

Pandit Hom Nath Upadhyaya (4 July 1943 – 7 September 2016) was a Nepali tabla player who specialized in Hindustani classical music. Upadhyaya served as royal court musician in Nepal.

== Early life and education ==
He was born on 4 July 1943 (20 Ashar 2000 BS) in Gyaneshwor, Kathmandu to father Tulsi Prasad Upadhyaya and mother Bhagirathi Upadhyaya. He received training in tabla from Pandit Ramji Mishra, Pandit Shambhu Mishra, and Ahmed Jan Thirakwa. In addition, Upadhyaya obtained a B.A. in English, History, and Sanskrit from Gorakhpur University and an M.A. in Music from Prayag Sangeet Samiti in Allahabad, India.

== Musical career ==
Upadhyaya served as royal court musician in Nepal. He played globally as a soloist and accompanist in both Hindustani and Western musical traditions, including for artists such as Manilal Nag, Tarun Bhattacharya, Mahesh Kale, Steve Gorn, Jim Pepper, and Paul Livingstone. He also played in the film orchestra of Bollywood music director S. D. Burman.

Upadhyaya taught extensively, both privately and at institutions such as the Royal Nepal Academy, Tribhuvan University, and the University of California, Santa Barbara. He has authored two books on tabla, one each in Nepali (Rhythmic Garland) and English (From Kashi To Kantipur: Theory, Practice and History of the Banaras Gharana of Tabla). His students include his son Pramod Upadhyaya, Sarita Mishra, Dheeraj Shreshtha, Atul Gautam, Rob Wallace, Rabin Lal Shreshtha, and Achyut Ram Bhandari.

== Awards and honours ==
Upadhyaya was conferred the Kirateshwar Sangeetshram Award and Nararaj Dhakal Award, and was a recipient of the Narayan Sangeet Pratishtan Fellowship of the Royal Nepal Academy and collaborative project grant from the Interdisciplinary Humanities Center, University of California, Santa Barbara.

== Death ==
Upadhyaya died on 7 September 2016 in Om Hospital, Kathmandu, Nepal.
