= Indri Gautama =

Indonesian pastor

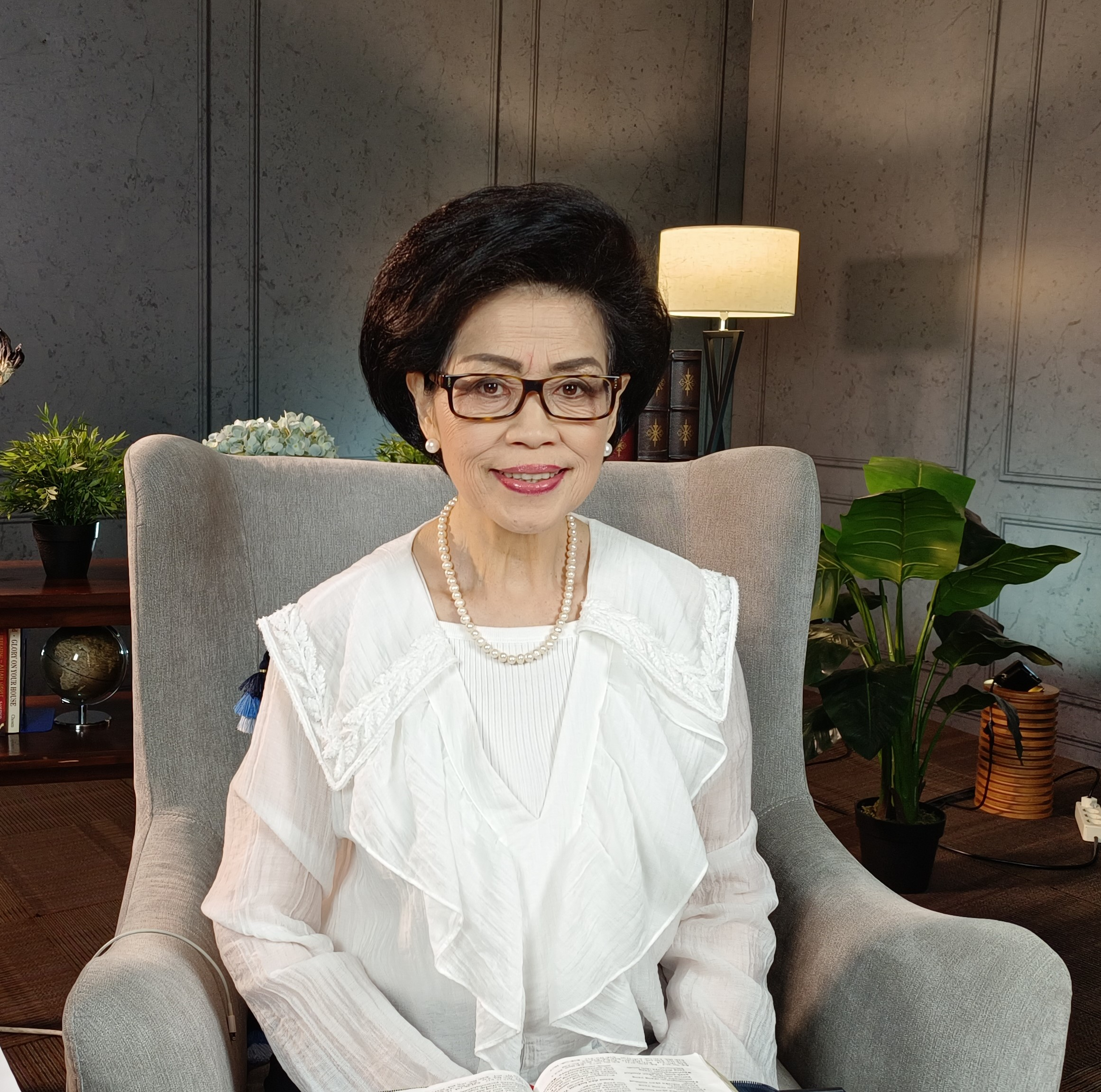
Indri Gautama

Indri Gautama is an Indonesian female Christian leader. She is the founder of Apostolic Generation Church and Maria Magdalena Ministries.

== See also ==
- Apostolic Generation Church
- Christianity in Indonesia
