= Gautama V. Vajracharya =

Gautama Vajra Vajracharya (Nepali: गौतम वज्र वज्राचार्य) is a Sanskritist and scholar specializing in the iconography of the Indian subcontinent. Vajracharya was born into a Newar family in Kathmandu in 1940.

Vajracharya's inclination toward Sanskrit and iconography was a result of his family environment. His father and uncle were both Sanskrit scholars. It was this family tradition of studying the archaic language of the Indian subcontinent that led to Gautama attending a Sanskrit school called Samsodhana Mandala. The school itself was set up by his father, who was wary of the Western schooling model of holding exams.

== Career ==
Vajracharya learned Sanskrit from Nayaraj Pant. Beside grammar Vajracharya was also taught to read ancient inscriptions and iconography. Vajracharya's first job, which was commissioned by Tribhuvan University, was writing a guide to the Basantapur Durbar Square. His career took a major turn when he received a scholarship by the Rockefeller Foundation in the late 1970s to work at the Los Angeles County Museum of Art under the supervision of Dr. Pratapaditya Pal, Senior Curator of Indian and Southeast Asian Art at the museum. Vajracharya got a master's degree in Art History from the Claremont Graduate University. He completed his Ph.D. in South Asian Languages and Literature from the University of Wisconsin–Madison. Vajracharya taught at the University of Wisconsin for nearly 30 years and is a Professor Emeritus in the Department of Art History. He has published numerous works and books related to the Nepali and South Asian history extracted from the region's art.
