= Golden Gate Academy =

Coordinates: 37.79944°N 122.18433°W

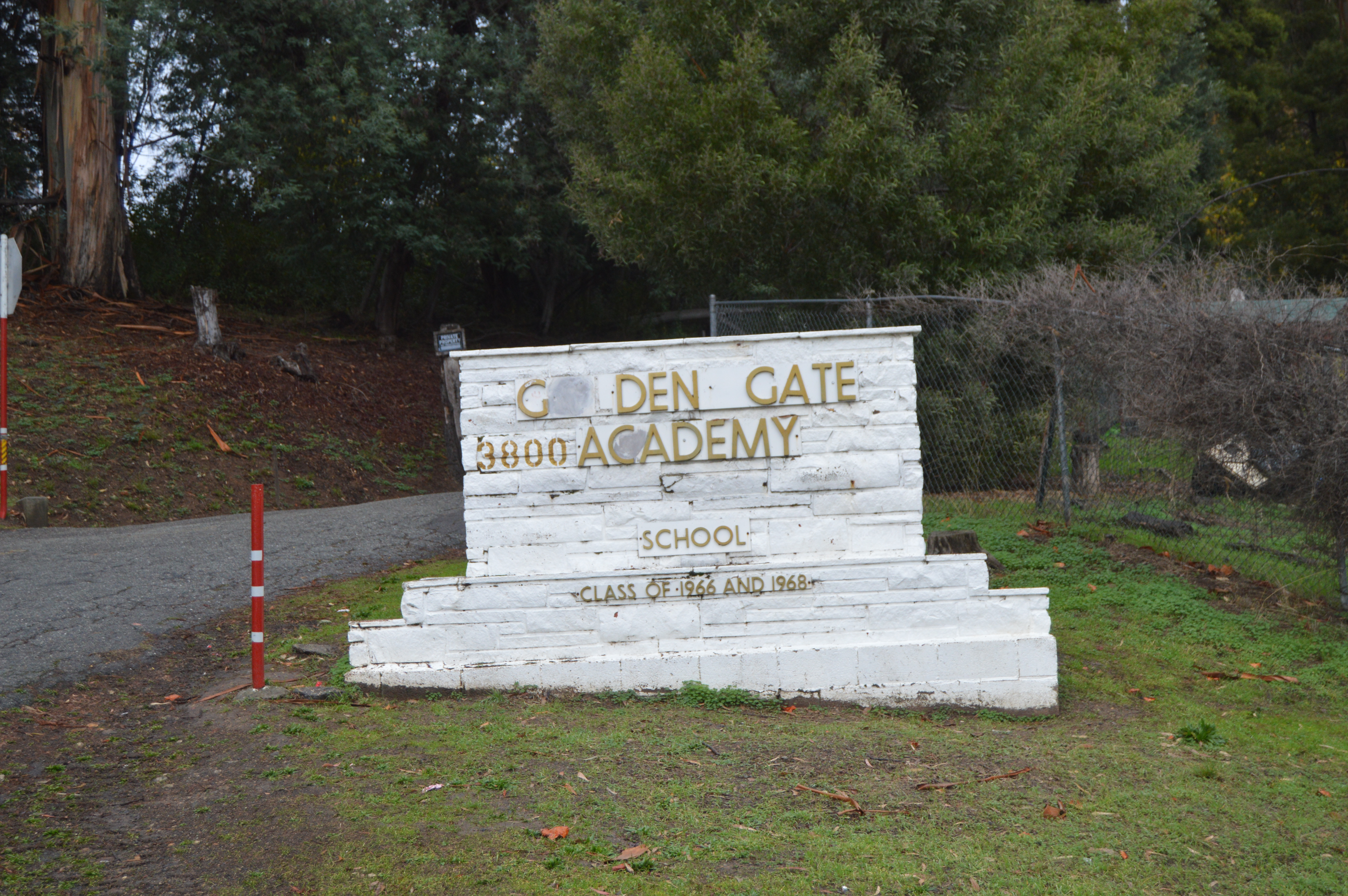
- Oakland, California; United States

Information
- Type: 1-8
- Established: 1923
- Mascot: Gators

Golden Gate Academy location in California

Golden Gate Academy (GGA) was founded in 1923 as a Seventh-day Adventist Elementary and High School on Mountain Boulevard in Berkeley, California. It remained there for 23 years until it moved to its current position in the Oakland Hills next to Holy Names University in 1949.

In 2007 the Northern California Conference of the Adventist church closed down Golden Gate Academy for lack of enrollment. The grounds are now used as a private arts school. The nearest K-8 Adventist elementary school to GGA is San Francisco Adventist School, located near City College of San Francisco. The nearest Adventist High School to GGA is Pleasant Hill Adventist Academy.

== See also ==
- List of Seventh-day Adventist secondary schools
- Seventh-day Adventist education
