= Chambi Khad =

- Location in Himachal Pradesh, India Chambi Khad (India)

Location
- Country: India
- State: State of Himachal Pradesh

Chambi Khad is a river in India. Chambi Khad is located in the State of Himachal Pradesh, in the northern part of the country, 400 km north of capital city New Delhi. Chambi Khad is part of the water channel on the Indus River.
