= Rajan Gautam =

Nepalese politician

The Honourable Rajan Gautam
- राजन गौतम

Member of Parliament, Pratinidhi Sabha
- Incumbent
- Assumed office 26 March 2026
- Preceded by: Shashanka Koirala
- Constituency: Nawalpur 1

Personal details
- Citizenship: Nepalese
- Party: Rastriya Swatantra Party
- Profession: Politician

Rajan Gautam (Nepali: राजन गौतम) is a Nepalese politician serving as a member of parliament from the Rastriya Swatantra Party. He is the member of the 7th Pratinidhi Sabha elected from Nawalpur 1 constituency in 2026 Nepalese General Election securing 50,945 votes and defeating his closest contender Bal Krishna Ghimire of the Nepali Congress.
