= Gautam Vaghela =

Indian artist (193647–2010)

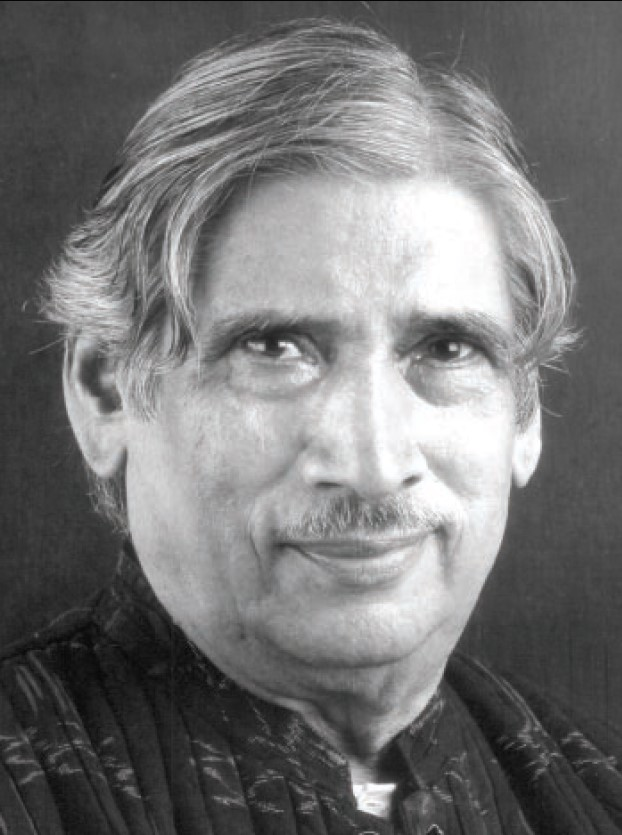
- Born: 5 January 1936
- Died: 6 April 2010 (aged 74)
- Education: Sir J. J. School of Art, Mumbai
- Known for: painting
- Awards: Padma Shri (1982)

Gautam Vaghela (5 January 1936 – 6 April 2010) was an Indian artist.

His early art education was at the Sir Jamsetjee Jeejebhoy School of Art in Bombay. He later he went on to train in fresco and mural techniques in Banasthali, Rajasthan. From 1962 to 1994 he was associated with the Weaver's Service Centre at the government of India's Ministry of Textiles. He retired as Director, Coordination and Design Exports for the Centres and Indian Institutes of Handloom Technology. The W.S.C's had artists working closely with weavers for the development of modern textile designs, and it was at the Centre that Vaghela interacted with artists including K.G. Subramanyan, Prabhakar Barwe and Ambadas.

Vaghela has illustrated several books including The Story of Dance: Bharata Natyam by Krishna Sahai and Another India: An Anthology of Indian Contemporary Fiction and Poetry with British painter Howard Hodgkin. In more than four decades as an artist and designer, he has exhibited all over India and overseas, including at the 1966 Biennale de Paris and the 1967 São Paulo Art Biennial.

== Awards ==
- 1982: Padma Shri
- 1990: Maharashtra Gaurav Puraskar

== Selected illustrations ==
- The Story of Dance: Bharata Natyam by Krishna Sahai (2003) ISBN 81-87981-51-2
- Another India: An Anthology of Indian Contemporary Fiction and Poetry (1990) ISBN 0-14-012428-4
