= Laxmi Gautam (professor) =

Indian academic (born 1963)

- Born: c. 1963; Vrindavan
- Other name: Angel of Vrindavan
- Education: Agra University
- Occupation: academic
- Employer(s): Institute of Oriental Philosophy, Vrindavan
- Awards: Nari Shakti Puraskar

Illustration of Dr. Laxmi Vijay Gautam

Laxmi Gautam (born c. 1963) is an Indian academic who dedicates her time to caring for abandoned widows. She has been called the "Angel of Vrindavan". In 2015 she received the Nari Shakti Puraskar in recognition of her work. She teaches at the Institute of Oriental Philosophy in Vrindavan.

== Life ==
Gautam was born about 1963 in Vrindavan. She studied Hindi and history at Agra University and obtained her doctorate. She then went on to be an associate Professor at the Institute of Oriental Philosophy, Vrindavan.

At a young age she began to understand that the women in white with shaved heads were widows. Child brides could become widows before they were women and then spend the rest of their lives as widows lacking respect or an expectation of being fed or looked after. In 1995 she was a deputy mayor.

Gautam decided to do something about the plight of widows and she started an NGO foundation in 2013. Widows frequently die penniless and young widows become prostitutes to survive.

Gautam searches to find the bodies of abandoned widows. Their bodies can be eaten by animals but she sees that the bodies are collected and they are given a respectful cremation. She does not just care for the dead, but the foundation she founded cares for abandoned widows. She has had thirty-five widows living under her support. Her foundation has also provided legal and emotional support to victims of sexual abuse.

In 2015 her work was recognised when she received the Nari Shakti Puraskar award. The citation noted that she handled bodies that rotted for days and she had performed the last rites on 500 bodies. However the award was for looking after the dead and the living as she arranged food, drink and a blanket.
