= Gautam Srivastava =

- Born: 1972 (age 53–54); Calcutta, India
- Education: University of California, Los Angeles
- Occupation: Executive Vice President
- Organization: Universal Music Group

Gautam Srivastava is the executive vice president of human resources at Universal Music Group.

== Career ==
Srivastava was born in Calcutta, India, and grew up in San Francisco. He graduated from University of California, Los Angeles, with a Bachelor's degree in business economics. His career has spanned management consulting, technology, and entertainment. He started his career with SCA Consulting, a boutique executive compensation consultancy focused on value-creating incentive plans, in Los Angeles and New York. He left SCA to join i-drive as vice president of finance in San Francisco and then On2.com. He later returned to consulting as a principal at Mercer Human Resources Consulting. In 2004, he joined Advanced Micro Devices, Inc. and held several general operating positions through 2008, including vice president of compensation and benefits; vice president and chief of staff of sales and marketing, and VP of sales and marketing and managing director, Middle East Africa and Pakistan, based in Dubai. In 2009, he joined LSI as senior vice president, chief human resources officer and was then also made chief marketing officer, in 2011. He was part of the management team that sold LSI in early 2014 to Avago (now Broadcomm) for $6.6 billion. In 2014 he was named senior vice president and chief human resources officer at Shutterfly, Inc.

In 2016, Srivastava was named executive vice president of human resources at Universal Music Group, reporting to Lucian Grainge, chairman and chief executive officer of Universal Music Group. He oversees all aspects of UMG's global human resources operations spanning over 60 countries and over 7500 employees. He is also a member of UMG's executive management board. He is based at the company's headquarters in Santa Monica, California.
