= Gautam Sharma "Vyathit" =

Indian folklorist, playwright, and poet (born 1938)

Gautam Chand Sharma Vyathit
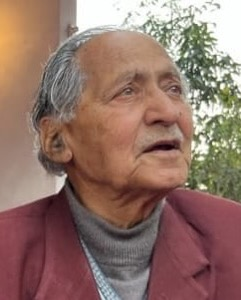
- Born: 15 August 1938 (age 88); Nerti
- Education: Guru Nanak Dev University; Panjab University
- Occupations: Professor, folklorist, playwright, poet, linguist
- Organization: Kangra Lok Sahitya Parishad
- Known for: Preservation of Kangri folk arts and knowledge Revival of Jhamakra dance
- Notable work: Kangri Lok Geet (1973); Dholru: Himachal ki lok gathae (1973); Kāṅgaṛā ke lokagīta, sāhityika viśleshaṇa evaṃ mūlyāṅkana (1984); Bharatiya sahitya ke nirmata: Baba Kanshi Ram (2000); Folklore of Himachal Pradesh (2006)
- Children: 1
- Awards: Sahitya Akademi Award (2007)

Gautam Sharma "Vyathit" (born on 15 August 1938; born Gautam Chand Sharma), is a folklorist, playwright, and poet from Himachal Pradesh, India. He is also known as Gautam Chand Sharma "Vyathit" or just Gautam Vyathit. He is noted for his literary works in Kangri and Hindi, as well as for his various efforts to preserve and nurture the endangered folk arts of Himachal Pradesh, especially those of the Kangra region. Vyathit was the joint recipient of the 2007 Sahitya Akademi Award (Bhasha Samman) for his contributions to Himachali languages and literature. 'Vyathit', Gautam Sharma's pen-name in Hindi, means 'pained', or 'distressed'.

== Personal life ==
Vyathit was born to Faquir Chand and Sheela Devi on 15 August 1938, at village Nerti in the Kangra district of erstwhile Punjab Province, British India. Nerti is now located in Kangra district, Himachal Pradesh, India. Vyathit did his primary schooling from Nerti, matriculation from the nearby village of Rait (1957), and B.A. (1965), B.Ed., and M.A. in Hindi (1968) from Panjab University. He ultimately earned a PhD in 1974, from the Guru Nanak Dev University in Punjab. His doctoral thesis was titled Literary evaluation and critical analysis of Kangri folk songs. He began his teaching career as a primary school teacher and proceeded to teach Hindi at Government College, Dharamshala for many years. Vyathit continues to live in Nerti.

Vyathit's son Durgesh Nandan, a poet and a writer, has been an active collaborator for several decades in his father's endeavours to preserve and articulate the endangered Kangri folk arts and disappearing ways of life.

== Works ==
=== Kangra Lok Sahitya Parishad ===
Vyathit has been the founder-director of the NGO 'Kangra Lok Sahitya Parishad' (translated as Kangra folk literature council), established at Nerti in 1973. This NGO works for documenting and promoting the endangered folk arts of Himachal Pradesh. Its activities have included surveying and documenting these arts, and organising cultural events including poetry recitals, folk theatre, folk dances, festivals, and publications. Vyathit has also developed an open-air theatre in Nerti, where the Parishad often hosts its activities.

=== Works on Kangri folk arts ===
Vyathit's documentation and analyses of Kangra's folklore have been considered significant by scholars of disciplines including literature, anthropology, and folklore studies. These include Kirin Narayan, and Alan Dundes, besides others. Since the early 1970s, Vyathit has been known for re-choreographing Kangra's Jhamakara folk-dance, which earlier used to be performed by women during marriage festivities only behind closed doors, and promoting this dance as a public art form. Vyathit is known for revitalising Kangra's traditional folk-theatre, infusing it with current themes and challenging traditional norms of participation in these plays.

=== Poetry ===
Vyathit is widely considered a prominent poet from Himachal Pradesh. He writes in Kangri and Hindi. His poems revolve around rural life and nature in Kangra. Atma Ram notes that Vyathit expresses the 'vyatha' (suffering; from which the pen-name 'vyathit' is derived) of the common person in rural Kangra.

=== Linguistics ===
Vyathit contributed the sections on Kangri and Hindi for the Himachal Pradesh volume of the People's Linguistic Survey of India.

=== Others ===
- Vyathit has been a patron of Kangra painting revival since the 1970s.
- Vyathit is a member of the Himachal Pradesh Brahmin Kalyan Board.

== Recognition ==
Some among the numerous awards received by Vyathit are the following:

- In 2007, Vyathit shared the Sahitya Akademi Award (Bhasha Samman) with Pratyush Guleri for his contributions to the Himachali language and literature.
- In 2014, Vyathit received the Shan-e-Himachal Award from Virbhadra Singh, then Chief Minister of Himachal Pradesh.
- In 2016, Vyathit received the Himachal Shiromani Samman from the Himachal Sanskritik Shodh Sansthan evam Natya Rangmandal.
- In 2022, Vyathit received the Himachal Gaurav Puraskar (Pride of Himachal Award) of the Government of Himachal Pradesh, from Jai Ram Thakur, then Chief Minister of the state.

== Select Bibliography ==
- (1973) Kangri Lok Geet. Palampur: Sheela Prakashan
- (1973) Dholru: Himachal ki lok gathae.
- (1984) Kāṅgaṛā ke lokagīta, sāhityika viśleshaṇa evaṃ mūlyāṅkana. Jayaśrī prakāśana
- (2000) Bharatiya sahitya ke nirmata: Baba Kanshi Ram.
- (2006) Folklore of Himachal Pradesh. Delhi: National Book Trust.
