= Gautam Kalita =

Indian bodybuilder

- professional bodybuilder

Personal info
- Born: Nagaon, Assam, India

Best statistics
- Chest: 42 in
- Height: 5 ft 3 in (1.60 m)
- Weight: 60 kg (132 lb)

Professional (Pro) career
- Best win: Mr World; 2007

Gautam Kalita is an Indian bodybuilder from Panigaon in Nagaon, Assam. He won the Mr World title in the Bantam class during ESPN-Musclemania World, a bodybuilding championship held in Los Angeles on 16–17 November 2007. He was born to Late Golok Kalita and Sabitry Kalita in Nagaon.

Gautam Kalita took to bodybuilding at the age of 20 with no formal training. He runs a gym named Nagaon Health Club in his home town.

== Achievements ==
In Bantam class, his achievements include:

- Mr. Nagaon (1989–90)
- Mr Assam (1994–98), five times
- Mr North East (2001-2002-2003), three times
- Mr India (2004-2005-2007)
- Mr World (2007)

== See also ==
- Mahadev Deka
- See Photo
