= Purna Bahadur Tamang =

Nepalese politician

Honourable Purna Bahadur Tamang
- पुर्ण वहादुर तमाङ्ग

Minister of State for Energy, Water Resources and Irrigation of Nepal
- In office 3 August 2024 – 23 April 2025
- President: Ram Chandra Poudel
- Prime Minister: K. P. Sharma Oli
- Preceded by: Deepak Bahadur Singh

Member of Parliament, Pratinidhi Sabha
- In office 22 December 2022 – 12 September 2025
- Succeeded by: Krishna Hari Budhathoki
- Constituency: Ramechhap 1

Personal details
- Born: 30 July 1965 (age 60) Ramechhap District
- Party: Nepali Congress
- Spouse: Laxmimaya Lama
- Parent: Sher Bahadur Tamang (father)

Purna Bahadur Tamang is a Nepalese politician, belonging to the Nepali Congress and is the former Minister of State for Energy, Water Resources and Irrigation of Government of Nepal. He has also served as member of the 2nd Federal Parliament of Nepal. In the 2022 Nepalese general election, he won the election from Ramechhap 1 (constituency).
