= Gautam Kaul (finance professor) =

American professor of finance

- Born: 27 April 1954; India
- Citizenship: United States
- Education: University of Chicago; University of Delhi
- Scientific career
- Fields: Finance
- Workplaces: Ross School of Business, University of Michigan (1985-present); University of Chicago (1984); Business India (1980-1981); University of Delhi (1976-1977)

Gautam Kaul is a John C. and Sally S. Morley Professor of Finance in the Ross School of Business, University of Michigan.

Kaul's research focuses on the behavior of stock and bond prices including asset pricing models, market microstructure and the time-series behavior of stock prices. He uses computer-intensive methodologies to gauge the effectiveness of trading strategies commonly proposed on Wall Street and in academic literature.

Kaul has published widely in top finance journals and was awarded the Senior Faculty Research Award in 2003 for sustained, exceptional, and continuing contributions to scholarly research in the field of business, and noteworthy contributions to building and maintaining a strong research environment at RSB.

Kaul is also involved in University of Michigan Social Venture Fund helping new innovative businesses create a greater social impact.

== Selected publications ==
- Value versus Glamour
- Good Capital
- Predictable Components in Stock Returns
- Acumen: Valuing Social Venture
- Oil and the Stock Markets
- Information, Trading and Volatility
- Asymmetric Predictability of Conditional Variances
