= Krishna Murari Gautam =

Nepali a writer and poet

Krishna Murari Gautam or popularly known as the Chatyang Master (Nepali: चट्याङ्ग मास्टर) is a writer, poet, comedian and social activist of Nepal. He founded a NGO called Ageing Nepal dedicated to the betterment of the ageing population which was awarded in 2020. He has participated in numerous national and international courses and conferences, has guided research and authored books on various issues pertaining to aged populations in Nepal.

== Career ==
Gautam did master's degree in economics from an Australian university and began his professional career in 1978 as an assistant lecturer. He joined the Agriculture Projects Services Center in 1979 as an Agriculture Specialist. In 1988, he was appointed as the Senior Agriculture Economist. He also established a consulting company and worked in various rural development projects in Nepal, China, and India. He has training and substantial experience in various subjects ranging from media to alternative energy technologies. He worked for the World Bank to share his knowledge with farmers in China and for the USAID to work in India. He also hosted a radio talk show on Radio Sagarmatha.

== Work for ageing people ==
In 2009 when his father passed by Alzheimer he was motivated to establish NGO for senior citizens. The NGO was named Ageing Nepal. This organization was awarded UNESCO King Sejong Literacy Prize in 2020.

== Awards ==
- Bhairab Award in 2071BS
