= Atul Gautam =

Atul Gautam (Nepali: अतुल गौतम) (1973 – 16 January 2005) was a talented Tabla Maestro of Nepal, born in 1973. He was a representative of the Kavi Prasad Gautam family who started endless 24 hours HARERAMA KIRTAN in Nepal 1929 AD. Lt Atul learnt music from his grandfather, father and later vocal from Ambika Rimal and Tabla from Pt Hom Nath Upadhyaya. He got a gold medal in Master's in Music Examination. He established Narayan Music Academy, Kirateshwor and later Sukarma. He visited many countries to popularize the Nepali classical music and Hare Rama Kirtan under an umbrella of जानकी जीवनकुञ्ज Janaki Jeevan Kunja. He died leaving his disciples Parsuram Poudel, Ananta Prajapati, Nabin Neupane, Santosh Verma, Madhusudan and others during 2005 due to a brain haemmorhage in Kathmandu.
