= Apostolic Generation Church =

Religious Organization

Church logo

Apostolic Generation Church (or Gereja Generasi Apostolik) is a non-denominational church located in Jakarta, Indonesia

As of March 2007, it has more than 1,800 weekly attendees during its English and Indonesian language services.

== Leadership ==
Apostle Indri speaking at a crusade held by Gereja Generasi Apostolik in Jakarta

Apostle Indri Gautama—as the church founder—is the senior pastor of Apostolic Generation Church. The church currently has 10 pastors with their unique area of ministries.

Indri Gautama founded the church without the name of AGC in 2002 with seven people. The church opened officially on the 3rd of April on the next year with the name Apostolic Generation Church, after Gautama met Naomi Dowdy, an American missionary living in Singapore.

== See also ==
- Indri Gautama
- Christianity in Indonesia
- Religion in Indonesia
