= Kulchandra Gautam =

Sanskrit scholar

Bidwat Shiromani Kulchandra Gautam
- कुलचन्द्र गौतम
- Born: 15 October 1867; Kel Tole, Kathmandu, Nepal
- Died: 29 December 1929 (aged 62); Kathmandu, Nepal
- Occupations: Sanskrit and Ayurveda scholar
- Children: Laxmi Nath Gautam (son)
- Parents: Ramakanta Gautam (father); Sabitri Devi Gautam (mother)

Pandit Kulchandra Gautam (Note: Nepali: पं. कुलचन्द्र गौतम) (born 15 October 1867) was a Nepalese Sanskrit scholar in the field of spirituality, language and philosophy. He has also worked in the field of Ayurveda. He was born in Nepal and hounured by the title of Bidwat Siromani. He has also been featured in the postage stamp of Nepal in 1992.

== Early life ==
Gautam was born on 15 October 1867 as the youngest child of Pandit Ramakanta Gautam (father) and Savitridevi Gautam (mother) in Tamaguru Tole, Jiwanpur Village of Dhading district of Nepal (currently in province 3). His exact birthday is controversial because his Janmakudali was burnt during his cremation. His siblings are Bhadranidhi Gautam, Dandapadi Gautam, the name of his sister is not known. The name Kulchandra was given to him while he was a student in Kashi. He died in 2015 B.S.

== Publications ==
Gautam has published various books in Sanskrit and Nepali language on various topics.

- Prapancha Charcha (pubhlished in 1993 BS (1936–1937) by Laxminarayan Publication, Kasi), in a form of epic, described the social, political, economic status of Rana rule in Nepal.
- Manas Manjari (ISBN 9789937266697)
- Translated Amarakosha into Nepali
- Sanskrit- Nepali dictionary
- Radhawlankar (2016 BS (1959–1960))
- Tulsikrit Ramayana (1996 BS (1939–1940))
- Alankar Chanradaya (1979 BS (1922–1923))
- Swayam Baidya (on Ayurbed 1972 BS (1915–1916))
- Purusartha Kalpaballi (1956 BS (1899–1900))
