= Suren Gautam =

Nepalese singer

Suren Gautam सुरेन गौतम
- Born: August 15; Nepal
- Genres: Folk, Pop & modern
- Occupation: Singer
- Years active: 2004 - present

Suren Gautam (Nepali: सुरेन गौतम) is also known as Surendra Gautam is a singer from Nepal known for his work in folk, pop, and modern music genres. He was born on August 15 in Arghakhanchi district of Nepal.

== Biography ==
Gautam started his musical journey in his early childhood in Nepal and has been contributing to the Nepali music industry since 2004, nearly 20 years. Tusaro is his first official song recorded in the year 2004. "Reshami Parda Le Chekena," "Pirati Lari Lai," "Baa Aakash Hun," "Dui Najar," and "Salleri Pakhaharu" are some of the popular songs in his musical career. A few of his songs, including "Pinajada Ko Surakshya," "Dui Najar," "Baa Aakash Hun," and "Salleri Pakhaharu," have received national and international awards. He has been recognized by Radio Nepal (Government of Nepal) as popular singer of Nepal.

== Songs ==
SN	Songs Name	Gener	ref
1	Baa Aakash Hun		
2	Pinjada Ko Surakshya		
3	Launa Ke Bho	Pop Songs	
4	Chekyo Danda Kuhirole	Pop Songs	
5	Sundar Sapana		
6	Timro Mero		
8	Saleri Pakhaharu		
9	Sadhai Sadhai		
10	Dui Najar		

== Awards ==
SN	Award title	Award Category	Notable work	Result	Ref
1	OS Nepal Music Award 2017	Best Modern Singer	Pinjada Ko Surakshya	Won	
2	4th Nepal Music & Fashion Award 2023	Best Singer-Folk Pop Song		Won	
3	4th OSNEPAL Music Award 2023	Best Modern Song	Baa Aakash Hun	Won	
4	4th Himalayan International Award	Best LokPop	Salleri Pakhaharu	Won	
