= Rajendra Prasad Gautam =

Nepalese politician

- राजेन्द्र प्रसाद गौतम

Member of Parliament, Pratinidhi Sabha
- In office 4 March 2018 – 18 September 2022
- Preceded by: Tara Man Gurung
- Constituency: Sankhuwasabha 1

Personal details
- Born: 20 December 1962 (age 63)
- Party: CPN (UML)

Rajendra Prasad Gautam is a Nepalese politician, belonging to the Nepal Communist Party currently serving as the member of the 1st Federal Parliament of Nepal. In the 2017 Nepalese general election he was elected from the Sankhuwasabha 1 constituency, securing 32769 (49.67%) votes.
