= Punjab States Agency =

Agency of British India

Coordinates: 30°6′N 77°10′E

- British Residency
- 1921–1947
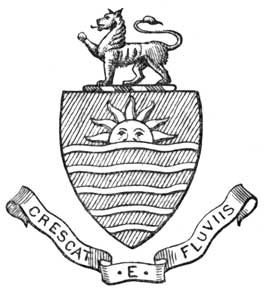
- Flag Coat of arms

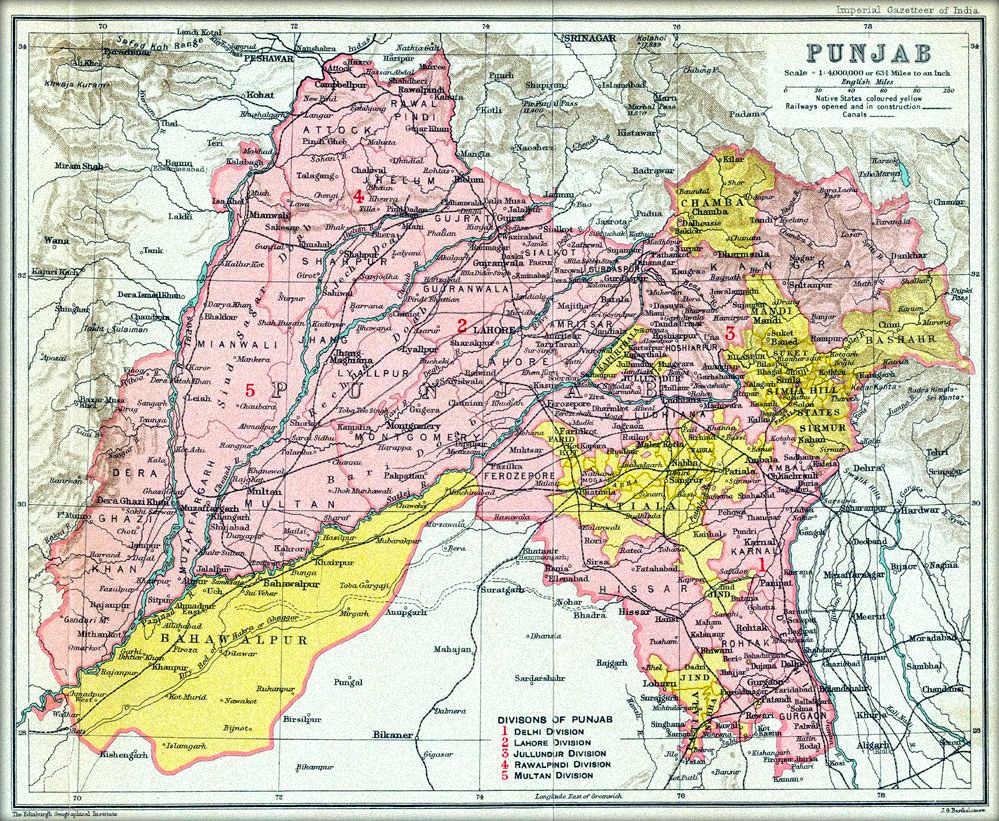
- Map of the British Punjab in 1909.
- Area
  - 1921: 86,430 km^{2} (33,370 sq mi)
- Population
  - 1921: 465,493
- Historical era: New Imperialism
  - Established: 1921
  - British withdrawal from India: 1947
Succeeded by
Patiala and East Punjab States Union
Simla Hill States
Bilaspur State (1950–54)
Bahawalpur (princely state)
- Today part of: In Pakistan: Punjab; in India: Punjab, Haryana, Himachal Pradesh

The Punjab States Agency was an agency of the British Raj. The agency was created in 1921, on the model of the Central India Agency and Rajputana Agency, and dealt with forty princely states in northwest India formerly dealt with by the Province of Punjab.

After 1947, all of the states chose to accede to the Dominion of India, except Bahawalpur, which acceded to the Dominion of Pakistan.

== History ==
After the 1809 Treaty of Amritsar, most Cis-Sutlej states came under British protection. Following the First Anglo-Sikh War and the Treaty of Lahore & Amritsar in 1846, several princely states such as Kapurthala, Jammu and Kashmir, and the hill states between the Beas and Ravi—previously part of the Sikh Empire—also came under British influence and were administered under the Punjab. Chamba was added to Jammu in 1846 but was separated from Jammu and established as a separate state in 1847. Jammu and Kashmir remained under the administration of the Punjab State until 1877, when it was placed under the direct political control of the Government of British India.

While the hill princely states south of the Sutlej came under the suzerainty of the British crown after the Anglo-Nepalese War of 1814–16 and became known as the Punjab Native States and the Simla Hill States. They later entered into direct diplomatic relations with the British province of Punjab, with the exception of Tehri Garhwal State, which maintained a connection with the United Provinces.

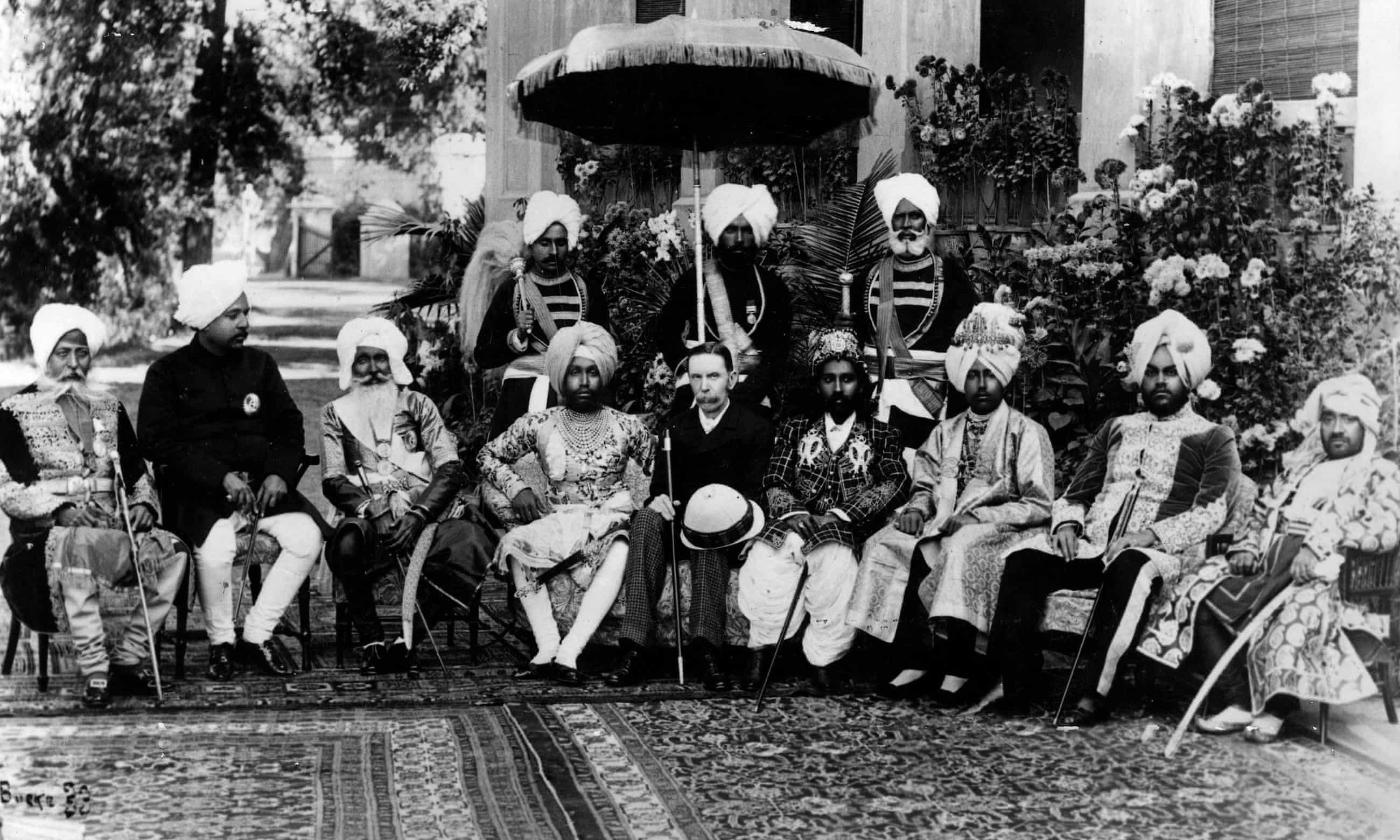
Photograph of the Lt. Governor of Punjab, Sir Dennis Fitzpatrick, with rulers of princely-states, namely Faridkot, Sirmur, Nabha, Patiala, Bahawalpur, Jind, Kapurthala, and Malerkotla, Lahore, 1894

The Punjab States Agency was established in 1921 out of the previous Punjab Native States, which had received advice from the Lieutenant Governor of Punjab Province, and the Simla Hill States, advised by the Deputy Commissioner of Simla district. The agency was created under the direct authority of the Governor General of India, with its headquarters in Shimla.

By 1941, the term "Punjab Hill States" had replaced "Shimla Hill States" in formal usage — particularly in census tables, reports, and statistical summaries. Until the 1941 Census, there were 18 Punjab Hill States and 16 Punjab States. After Indian Independence in 1947, except Bahawalpur State (which acceded to the Dominion of Pakistan), all others acceded to the new Dominion of India and became part of East Punjab. Today, these regions are part of Punjab (Pakistan) and Punjab, Himachal, Haryana (India).

== Princely states survived till 1947 ==
=== Punjab States Agency & Punjab Hill State ===
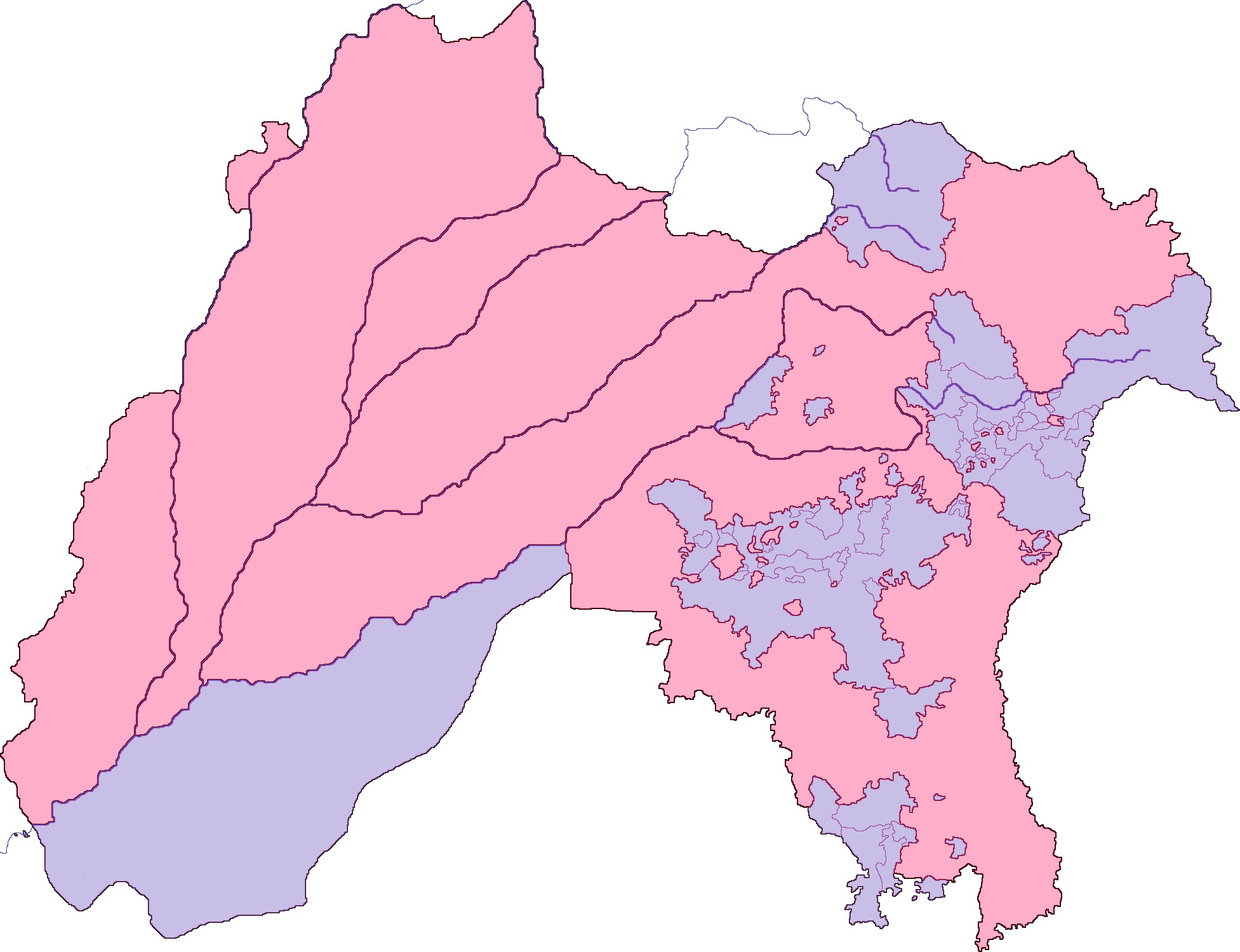
Map of Punjab in 1947, with princely-state territory in purple & direct British-rule in pink.

18 Punjab Hill State & 16 Punjab State Noted in 1941 Census

Those 16 Punjab state were Patiala, Nabha, Jind, Kapurthala, Kalsia, Faridkot, Bahawalpur, Maler Kotla, Loharu, Dujana, Pataudi, Bilaspur (Kahlur), Chamba, Mandi, Sirmur (Nahan), Suket. and 18 Punjab hill states were Nalagarh (Hindur), Bashahr, Baghat, Balsan, Beja, Bhajji, Darkoti, Dhami, Jubbal, Keonthal, Kumharsain, Kunihar, Kuthar, Mahlog, Mangal, Sangri, Tharoch.

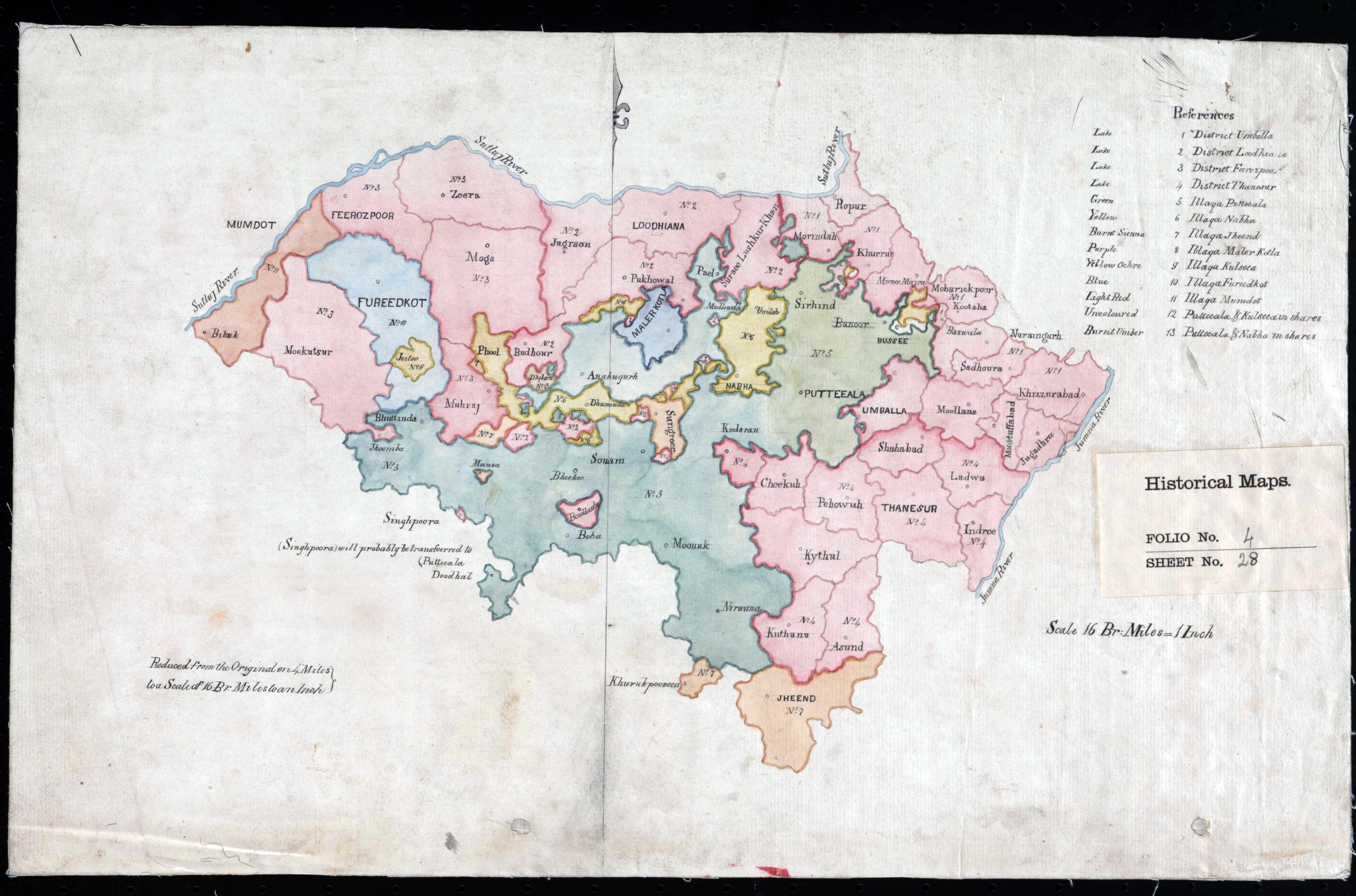
Map of the Cis-Sutlej territory 1846-51

=== State by Fall Region ===
==== Pakistan ====
- Punjab
1. Bahawalpur (now in Pakistan), title Nawab, Hereditary salute of 17-guns (later promoted to 21 guns by the Pakistani president)

==== India ====
Details map on village level of the Cis-Sutlej Princely States of Punjab (c. 1829–1835) showing over 60 states and estates, along with Lahore (Sikh Empire) and direct British territory.

- PEPSU (7 Punjab State & 1 Punjab Hill State)
1. Patiala, title Maharaja, Hereditary salute of 17-guns (19-guns local)
2. Nabha, title Maharaja, Hereditary salute of 13-guns (15-guns local)
3. Jind, title Maharaja, Hereditary salute of 13-guns (15-guns personal and local)
4. Kapurthala, title Maharaja, Hereditary salute of 13-guns
5. Faridkot, title Raja, Hereditary salute of 11-guns
6. Malerkotla, title Nawab, Hereditary salute of 11-guns
7. Kalsia, title Raja, Non Salute
8. Nalagarh (Hindur), Non Salute Punjab Hill state
- Himachal Pradesh (17 Punjab Hill State & 4 Punjab state)
1. Chamba, title Raja, Hereditary salute of 11-guns
2. Mandi, title Raja, Hereditary salute of 11-guns
3. Sirmur (Nahan), title Maharaja, Hereditary salute of 11-guns
4. Suket (Sundarnagar), title Raja, Hereditary salute of 11-guns
5. Bashahr, title Raja, Personal 9 guns-salute(Personal) Punjab Hill state
6. Baghal, Non Salute Punjab Hill state
7. Baghat, Non Salute Punjab Hill state
8. Balsan, Non Salute Punjab Hill state
9. Beja, Non Salute Punjab Hill state
10. Bhajji, Non Salute Punjab Hill state
11. Darkoti, Non Salute Punjab Hill state
12. Dhami, Non Salute Punjab Hill state
13. Jubbal, Non Salute Punjab Hill state
14. Keonthal, Non Salute Punjab Hill state
15. Kumharsain, Non Salute Punjab Hill state
16. Kunihar, Non Salute Punjab Hill state
17. Kuthar, Non Salute Punjab Hill state
18. Mahlog, Non Salute Punjab Hill state
19. Mangal, Non Salute Punjab Hill state
20. Sangri, Non Salute Punjab Hill state
21. Tharoch, Non Salute Punjab Hill state
- Bilaspur
1. Bilaspur (Kahlur), title Raja, Hereditary salute of 11-guns
- Merge within surrounded districts of East Punjab
1. Loharu, title Nawab, Hereditary salute of 9-guns added in Hisar District
2. Dujana, title Nawab. added into Rohtak District
3. Pataudi, title Nawab added into Gurgaon District

Today, all of Himachal Pradesh, along with Bilaspur, Nalagarh, and a very small part of Patiala State (its Kandaghat Tehsil part), is part of Himachal Pradesh. All merged states (Dujana, Loharu, Pataudi), most of Kalsia (chachruali etc.) and Jind (including Jind and Dadri), as well as some parts of Patiala (Such as Pinjore, Narwana and Mahendragarh) and Nabha (Bawal), are now part of Haryana. Some parts of Kalsia (such as Dera Bassi, charik) and Jind (like Sangrur, balanwali etc.), most of Patiala and Nabha, and the entire states of Faridkot, Malerkotla, and Kapurthala are now part of Punjab.

== Princely States: annexed by Britisher ==
Map of the Cis-Sutlej Princely States of Punjab (c. 1829–1835), showing over 60 states and estates, along with Lahore (Sikh Empire) and direct British territory.

- Jagadhari, tittle sardar, annexed in 1829
- Thanesar, tittle Sardar, annexed in 1832 & 1850
- Kaithal, title Bhai ( Maharaja) annexed in 1843
- Ladwa State, title Sardar, annexed in 1846
- Dialgarth tittle Sardar, annexed in 1852
- Raikot, tittle nawab, annexed in 1854
- Mamdot, tittle nawab, annexed in 1855
- Bahadurgarh, title Nawab, annexed 1857
- Ballabgarh, title Raja, annexed 1857
- Farrukhnagar, title Nawab, annexed 1857
- Jhajjar, title Nawab, annexed 1857

And Many more.

=== Transfer ===
- Jammu & Kashmir, formerly included (from 1846) among the Punjab States, was placed under the direct Political control of the Government of British India in 1877.

== Jagirs ==
- Kunjpura, title Nawab
- Arnauli, title Bhai
- Karnal, title Nawab
- Shantiabad, title Sardar
- Dhanaura, title Sardar
- Tangaur, title Sardar
- Jharauli, title Sardar
- Shamgarh, title Sardar
- Panipat, title Nawab
- Shahzadapur, title Sardar
- Mustafabad, title Sardar
- Gogripur, title Chaudhary

== Historical princely states of the Punjab Hills ==
- Kangra
- Kangra-Nadaun
- Jaswan
- Guler (Haripur)
- Siba
- Datarpur
- Kutlehar
- Madhopur
- Nurpur

== Simla Hill States Superintendency of the Punjab States Agency ==
Salute states:

- Bashahr, title Raja, Personal 9 guns-salute

Non-salute states, alphabetically:

- Baghal
- Baghat
- Balsan
- Beja
- Bhajji
- Darkoti
- Dhami
- Jubbal
- Keonthal
- Kumharsain
- Kunihar
- Kuthar
- Mahlog
- Mangal
- Nalagarh (Hindur)
- Sangri
- Tharoch

== Dynasties by State ==
The following are the dynasties of respective states of the Punjab Agency:

Salute states, by precedence:

- Patiala - Sidhu Jat (Phulkian Dynasty)
- Bahawalpur - Daudpotra Abbasi
- Jind - Sidhu Jat (Phulkian Dynasty)
- Kapurthala - Kalal Jat
- Nabha - Sidhu Jat (Phulkian Dynasty)
- Bilaspur (Kahlur) - Agrok Rajput
- Chamba - Agrok Rajput
- Faridkot - Brar Jat (Phulkian Dynasty)
- Maler Kotla (Malerkotla) - Sherwani Pathan
- Mandi - Chandravansi Rajput (Lunar Race)
- Sirmur (Nahan) - Jadu Bhati Rajput
- Suket - Chandravansi Rajput (Lunar Race)
- Loharu - Pathan

Non-salute states, alphabetically :

- Dujana State - Yusufzai Pathan
- Mamdot - Hassanzai Pathan
- Pataudi - Barech Pathan

Annexed States:

- Bahadurgarh - Barech Pathan
- Ballabgarh - Tewatia Jat
- Farrukhnagar - Baluch
- Jhajjar - Barech Pathan

== See also ==
- Political integration of India
