= Hill States of India =

Princely states in the northern border regions of British India

Historical Hill States of the Punjab Hills region

The Hill States of India were princely states lying in the northern border regions of the British Indian Empire. The historic terms Punjab Hills and Pahari Hills were used to describe the foothills of the Western Himalayan-range prior to the independence of India in 1947.

== History ==
=== Punjab Hills ===
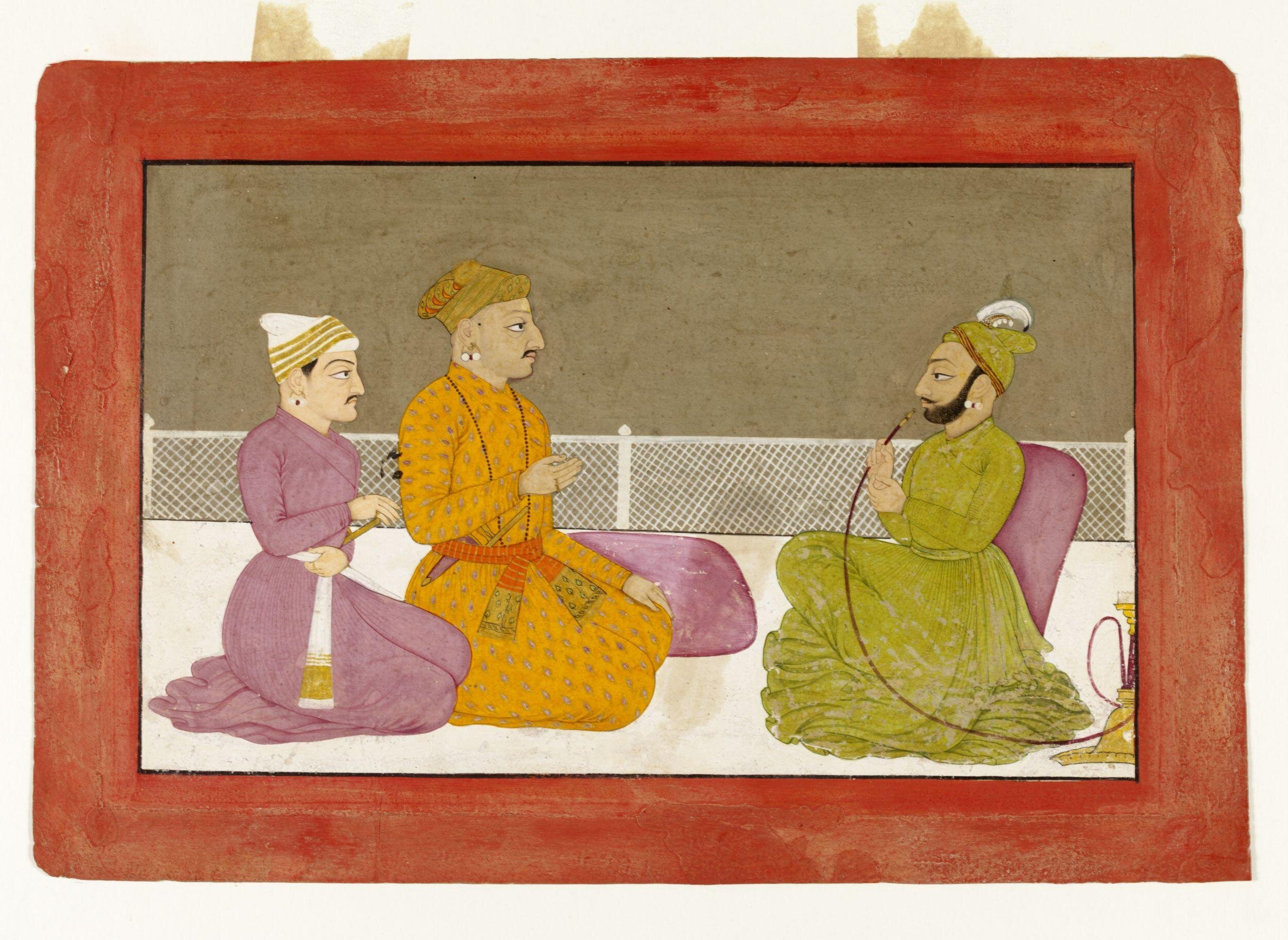
Painting of a meeting between the Pahari rulers Raja Bhupal Dev of Jasrota State, Raja Dalip Singh of Guler State, and Raja Daya Dhata of Nurpur State, ca.1705

Prior to the late 1940s, the region that is now classified as Jammu and Himachal Pradesh was termed the "Punjab Hills". The Punjab Hills are around 483 kilometres (300 miles) long and 161 kilometres (100 miles) wide. It consisted of a range of foot-hills, known as the Shivalik Range, meeting the Punjab Plains. The hills of the region are stony and rough. The term "Punjab Hills" is now only generally used in the present era to describe painting styles produced in the courtly settings of Mankot, Guler, Kangra, Kulu, Mandi and Basohli states. The Punjab Hills are not to be confused with the Punjab Plains (i.e. the Punjab proper, being the plains-region with five rivers running through it). There were 35 states located in the Punjab Hills.

==== Early history ====
The term Dogra is thought to derive from Durgara, the name of a kingdom mentioned in an eleventh century copper-plate inscription in Chamba. According to Mira Seth, the Durgara region was situated between the outer hills located between the Ravi and Chenab rivers and was derived from a tribal name. In medieval times the term became Dugar, which later turned into Dogra. Kalhana's Rajatarangini makes no mention of a kingdom by this name, but it could have been referred to by its capital (either Vallapura, modern Balor, or Babbapura, modern Babor). In modern times, the term Dogra turned into an ethnic identity, claimed by all those people that speak the Dogri language.

Prior to the arrival of the Dogras in the region, the local inhabitants of the Durgara region were likely Khasas and Kanets, who originally inhabited the Western Himalayan-range. Migrations of Dogri-speaking peoples later followed. The Dogras claim descent from migrants who originated from the present-day regions of Uttar Pradesh, Bihar, and Bengal prior to the Islamic invasions of the Indian subcontinent. Most of the ruling families of the Pahari Hill States traditionally trace their ancestry back to Ayodhya, claiming descent from Sumitra, who was the last descendant of the Suryavanshi lineage of Rama. An ancestor named Jambu Lochan is said to have first moved to the Jammu region, where he established the settlement of Jammu. According to local mythology, Jambu decided to construct a settlement at Jammu after he witnessed a wild goat and lion drinking from the same water-hole in a forest that was located at the site, being impressed by how two species of predator and prey could peacefully co-exist. From there onwards, branches of the family spread-out to conquer the surrounding mountainous areas of the region, establishing their own dynasties.

In around the year 850, the Dogras came to power in Jammu, being established by Raja Bhuj or Bhuj Dev. The centres of power for the Dogra rulers at this era were Bahu, Babbapura (Babor), and Jammu. The first historical mention to a Pahari ruler relates to two copper-plate inscription dated to the years 1056 and 1066 that eulogize the feats of Raja Sahilavarman of Chamba State (r. 920–940).

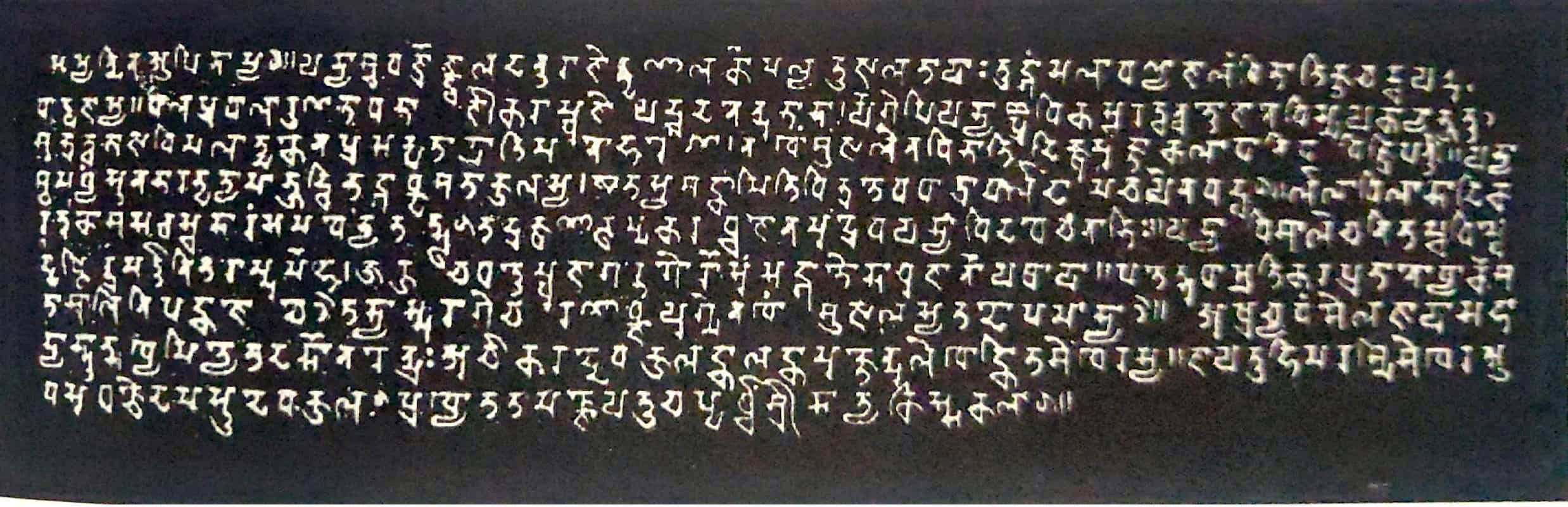
Inscription of text from the Sarahan Prashasti, a Sanskrit poem, incised on stone tablet, Sarahan (near Saho), Himachal Pradesh, circa 10th century

The earliest type of administration in the region consisted of reigns by feudal chieftains, referred to as a thakur or rana. This form of government gradually shifted to one that was hereditary based on primogeniture, leading to the formation of dynasties. These states often warred with one another, absorbing or being absorbed by other states, with the winner usually being the stronger state and the loser the smaller one. By the tenth century, the following prominent Dogra states arose in the Pahari Hills region of the Western Himalayas:

- Jammu – ruled by the Jamwal clan
- Mankot – ruled by the Mankotia clan
- Jasrota – ruled by the Jasrotia clan
- Lakhanpur – ruled by the Lakhanpuria clan
- Samba – ruled by the Sambial clan
- Tirikot – ruled by the Tiri Kotia clan
- Akhnur – ruled by the Akhnuria clan
- Riasi – ruled by the Riasial clan
- Dalpatpur – ruled by the Dalpatia clan
- Bhau – ruled by the Bhauwal clan
- Bhoti – ruled by the Bhatial clan
- Chenehni – ruled by the Hantal clan
- Bandralta – ruled by the Bandral clan
- Basholi – ruled by the Balauria clan
- Bhadrawaha – ruled by the Bhadrawahia clan
- Bhadu – ruled by the Bhaduwal clan
- Kashtwar – ruled by the Kashtwaria clan
- Punch – ruled by the Manjwal clan
- Kotli – ruled by the Mangral clan
- Rajauri – ruled by the Jaral clan

There is a mention in Kalhana's Rajatarangini of three Dogra rulers, namely Kirti and Vajradhara of Babbapura and Umadhara. All three of these rulers are also mentioned in the Vansavali (genealogy) of the Jammu ruling house, albeit with minor variations. The Jammu rulers were close with the Kashmiri rulers, such as during the reign of Kalasa and Bhikshachara. The Dogra-ruler Vajradhara is said to have allied with Trigarta (Kangra), Vallapura (Balaor), Vartula (Batal), and Thakkuras of the Chandrabhaga Valley, to pledge alliegance to Bhikshachara of Kashmir. Bhikshachara asceded to the throne of Kashmir in 1120.

==== Mughal vassalage ====
The Mughals were aggressive toward the small states of the Western Himalayas, with Akbar declaring himself as their sovereign ruler. The Punjab Hill states became tributaries to the Mughals around the reign of Akbar (r. 1556–1605). With the capture of the Kangra Fort by the Mughal forces under Jahangir (r. 1605–1627), it allowed Mughal-influence to more effectively permeate into the Punjab Hills. The Mughals maintained regional influence through a kilahdar (fort-keeper) that was stationed at Kangra and hostages from more rebellious hill states were kept at the Mughal court. Twenty-two of the hill states recognized the sovereignty of Akbar and each dispatched a local prince to the Mughal court. The princes would effectively be hostages to ensure that the small hill states would act courteous to the Mughal authority. The Pahari hill states in-reality were de facto quite independent from the Mughals, even with this arrangement. This relative independence allowed the hill states freedom regarding their internal affairs and also allowed them to war against each-other without reference to the Mughal emperor. Usually when two hill states warred with one another, the defeated state often appealed to the regional Mughal viceroy and the Delhi court to assist them against their rival.

However, the hill states often resisted the Mughals and rose up in rebellion against them, such is the case with Jammu State, which rose in insurrection against the Mughals on three separate instances during this time: the first between the years 1588–9, the second between 1594–5, and the third from 1616–17. During the reign of Akbar between the years 1594–95, the Jammu ruler Raja Parasram Dev teamed-up with fellow Pahari rulers Rai Pratap of Jasrota and Rai Balbhadra of Lakhanpur in a rebellion against the Mughals, which raged from Kangra to the Jammu Hills.

According to Sikh legend, the sixth Sikh guru, Guru Hargobind, helped secure the release of 52 "Rajput rajas" of the Hill region who were jailed in Gwalior Fort. This event is celebrated as Bandi Chhor Divas by Sikhs. Portraiture of rulers arose in the Pahari polities in the first quarter of the 16th century.

==== Decline of the Mughals and rise of the Sikhs ====
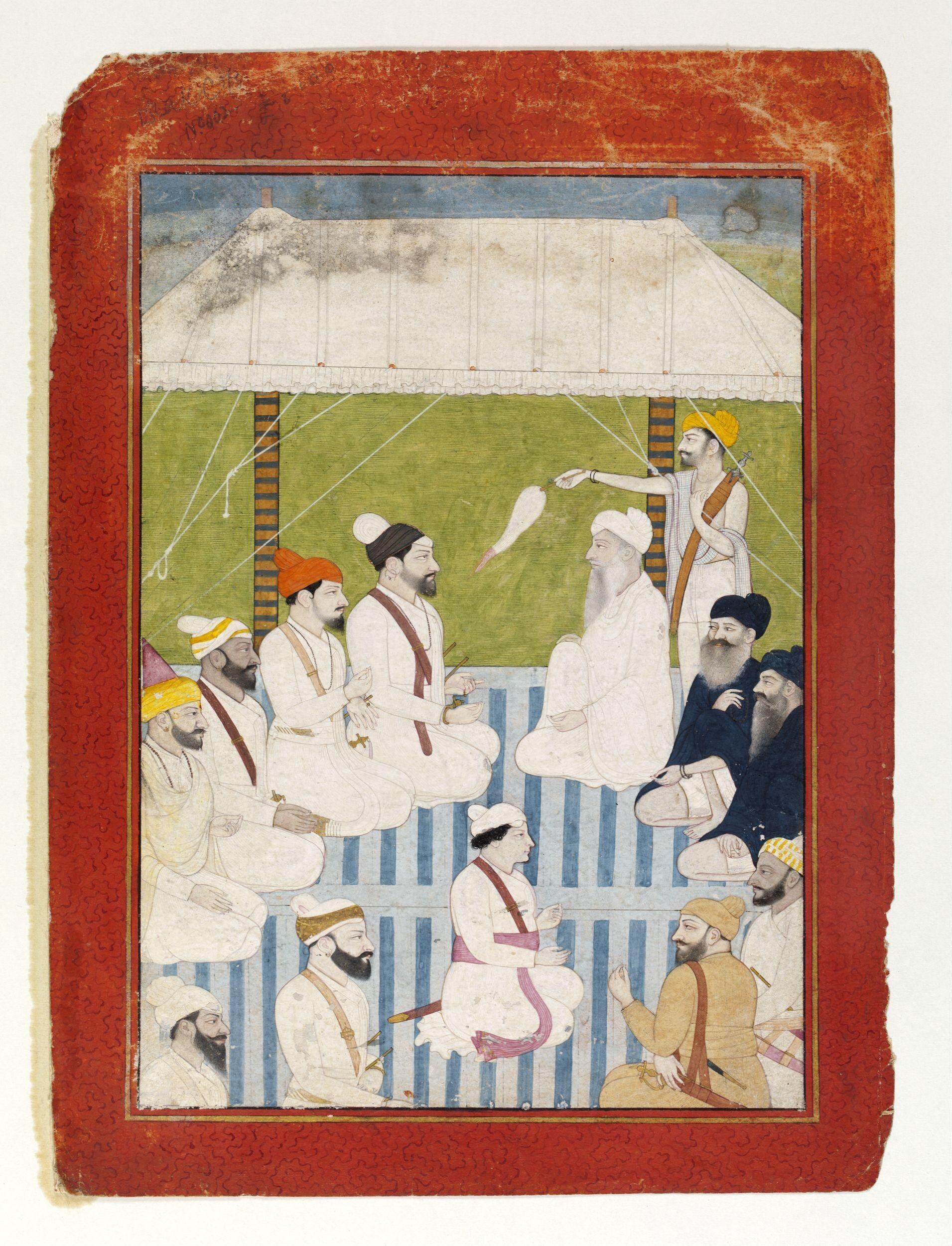
Painting of Jai Singh Kanhaiya receiving Raja Raj Singh (1764-1794) of Chamba, Raja Prakash Chand (1773-1790) of Guler, and other Hill princes with a canopy overhead, ca.1774

Due to the invasion of northern India by the Persians in 1738–39 under Nader Shah, and the subsequent invasions by the Durrani Afghans under the leadership of Ahmad Shah Durrani, central Mughal authority collapsed, which allowed the Sikhs to rise in the Punjab Plains and the Pahari Rajput states to re-cement their independence in the Punjab Hills. With the Pahari Rajput states gaining their true independence again, Kangra State was one of the hill states that greatly benefited from the changed times, as Raja Sansar Chand of Kangra State took-over the Kangra Fort in 1786, with him being the first Katoch raja to-do so in 166 years. By 1794, Kangra State had bested the adjacent states of Guler (in 1786), Mandi (in 1792), and Chamba (in 1794). By the closing years of the 18th century, the Sikh leader Ranjit Singh had emerged as the hegemonic ruler of much of the Punjab Plains, with his influence shortly after reaching the hill states. In 1803–04, a conflict occurred in Hoshiarpur between the Sikh Empire and Kangra State, with Kangra being bested and their expansionary ambitions being foiled by the Sikhs. In 1806, the Gurkhas conquered Kangra State and occupied it for a period of three years, with the Kangra ruler requesting Sikh-assistance to oust the occupying Nepalis from the territory. With the Sikhs obliging and successfully dislodging the Nepalis, the Kangra State ceased to become independence and assumed vassalage status to the Sikh Empire, with Ranjit Singh being given control over the Kangra Fort (Kot Kangra) as well. While Sansar Chand tried to negotiate with the Sikh-ruler to obtain more freedoms, he was ignored by Ranjit Singh and the Kangra ruler died in 1823. Ranjit Singh tried to continue controlling the Katoch ruling family by setting up the daughter of Sansar Chand to be wedded to the Dogra official Raja Hira Singh. However, the Kangra-ruler Raja Anirudh Chand (r. 1823–28) left the Kangra estate in 1828 and brought his sisters with him to prevent such a marriage from taking-place. The daughter eventually was married to Raja Sudarshan Shah of Tehri-Garhwal State.

Map of the various Hill States of the Punjab Hills region ("Alpine Punjab") between the Indus River and Sutlej River, surveyed by Alexander Cunningham, drawn by Kalleemoodden, copied in 1852

During the 17th, 18th, and early 19th century, there were 35 feudal states located in the Punjab Hills. Each state was ruled by a Rajput ruler. Around two-thirds of the states were patrons of painting, with 23 of the states specifically being known patrons of art. The following were the 35 polities (kingdoms and principalities) located in the Punjab Hills region during the pre-colonial period:

- Baghal (Arki)
- Bandralta (Ramnagar)
- Bangahal
- Bashahr
- Basohli
- Bhadrawah
- Bhadu
- Bhau
- Bhoti
- Chamba
- Chanehni
- Dalpatpur
- Datarpur
- Garhwal
- Guler
- Hindur (Nalagarh)
- Jammu
- Jasrota
- Jaswan
- Kahlur (Bilaspur)
- Kangra
- Kashtwar
- Kotla
- Kullu (Kulu)
- Kutlehr
- Lakhanpur
- Mandi
- Mankot
- Nurpur
- Punch (Poonch)
- Samba
- Siba
- Sirmur (Nahan)
- Suket
- Tirikot

==== Subdivisions ====
The Punjab Hills could be further subdivided into three areas:

1. Northwest area (loosely termed the "Jammu" area) – located on the northwest end of the hill range, containing 16 hill states in three parallel rows, contained around one-fifth of the total area of the Punjab Hills. The first row of hill states of this sub-region was adjoined to the Punjab Plains region and contained the states of Lakhanpur, Jasrota, Samba, Tirikot, Dalpatpur, and Jammu states. The second row was located around 32 kilometres into the hills and were bounded by mountain ranges, it consisted of five hill states, namely Basohli, Bhadu, Mankot, Bandralta (Ramnagar), and Bhoti. The third row was deeper into the mountains and contained the hill states of Bhau, Chanehni, Bhadrawah, and Kashtwar. Punch State was technically outside of the region as it lay to the west of the Tawi river but is still included for practical reasons.
2. Central area – located to the southeast of the northwest sub-region mentioned above. Two of Punjab's rivers, the Ravi and Beas, flows through this sub-region. The hill states that were located in this area were: Nurpur, Guler, Kotla, Chamba, Siba, Datarpur, Kangra, Kutlehr, Jaswan, and Bangahal. The most powerful states of this sub-region were Chamba and Kangra states, who dominated the area.
3. Southeast area – located to the southeast of the central sub-region mentioned above. It contains nine hill states (not including the Shimla Hills): Kullu (Kulu), Mandi, Suket, Kahlur (Bilaspur), Baghal (Arki), Hindur (Nalagarh), Sirmur (Nahan), Bashahr, and Garhwal. This was the largest sub-region and it contained around half the total area of the Punjab Hills. Kullu (Kulu) and Bashahr states were the furthest away from the Punjab Plains, with them bordering the high Himalayan mountain-ranges beyond.

=== Colonial period ===
During the colonial Raj period, two groups of princely states in direct relations with the Province of British Punjab became part of the British Indian Empire later than most of the former Mughal Empire, in the context of two wars and an uprising.

For its princely rulers the informal term Hill Rajas has been coined. It does not apply to other native hill country princes such as the Rawat of Rajgarh.

After the independence and split-up of British India, the Hill States acceded to the new Dominion of India and were later divided between India's constituent states of Punjab (proper), Haryana and Himachal Pradesh.

== List of hill states during the British Raj ==
=== Simla Hills ===
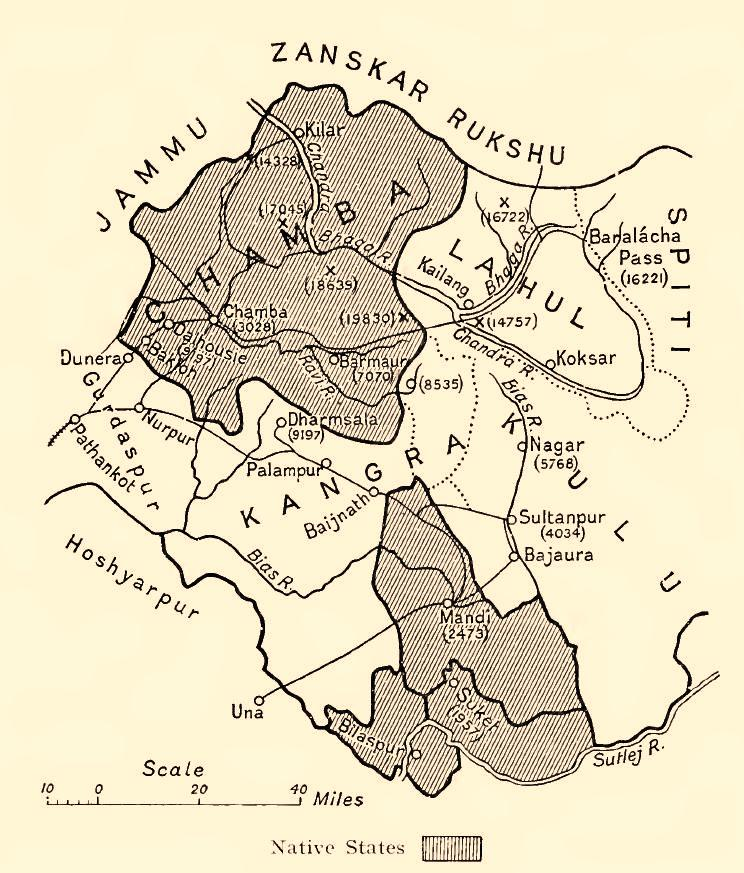
Map of some Hill states, 1911

28 princely states (including feudatory princes and zaildars) in the promontories of the western Himalaya were named after Shimla as the Simla Hill States. These states were ruled mainly by Hindu Rajputs.

Three quarters of the about 4,800 square miles (12,000 km^{2}), on both sides of the Sutlej river, was the territory of the Raja (earlier Rana) of Bashahr. The direct tributaries of Bashahr were :

- the Thakur of Khaneti
- the Thakur of Delath

Initially both Khaneti and Delath were feudatory of Kumharsain.

The other, all far smaller, princely states, including a few with some petty dependencies of their own, were further south, on the left bank of the Sutlej :

- the Rana (also styled as Rana Saheb) of Kumharsain. Tributaries of Kumharsain until 1815 were:
  - the Rana of Balsan
  - the Thakur of Madhan
  - the Thakur of Bharauli
- the Thakur of Beja State
- the Rana of Bhaji /Bhajji
- a prince of Bhagat
- the Raja of Bilaspur (formerly Kahlur/Kehloor), entitled to an 11-guns salute
- the Rana of Darkoti
- the Rana (Shri) of Dhami
- the Raja (formerly Rana) of Jubbal, which had two tributaries:
  - the Thakur (sahib) of Dhadi State, initially tributary to Tharoch, then to Bashahr and finally in 1896 to Jubbal.
  - (title?) Rawin = Rawingarh
- the Raja (formerly Rana) of Keonthal, where the feudal pyramid included five zaildars (jagirdars collecting a special tax) :
  - a Jagirdar Gundh
  - a Jagirdar Madhan = Kiari
  - the Rana Sahib of Koti (since 1815)
  - the Thakur Saheb (also styled as Rana) of Ratesh (popularly known as Kot, 'fortress')
  - the Rana of Theog
- the Thakur of Kunihar
- the Rana of Kuthar
- the Thakur of Mahlog
- the Rana of Mangal
- the Raja of Nalagarh
- the Thakur (or Rai Mian) of Sangri State
- the Thakur (originally titled Rana up to the occupation by the Gurkhas; Thakurs from 1815 to 1929) of Tharoch = Tiroch

NB - For various of the entities above, the authentic title of the chieftain is missing. While some of the lowest ranking may have had none, for the princes that can merely be due to insufficient sources available

The princely states of the Simla Hills all ultimately became part of the modern Indian state of Himachal Pradesh.

=== States of the Punjab Hills ===
Some nearby Hindu and Sikh states include :

- the Maharaja of Kangra,
- the Raja (Saheb) of Chamba, entitled to an 11 gun salute
- the Raja of Mandi,
- the Raja of Suket,
- the Raja of Siba, no salute, as Siba was not fully part of the British Indian Empire, only Siba Jagir (Jagir of Mian Devi Singh) up to Kotla.
- etc.

== Demographics ==
=== Shimla Hill States ===
Religious groups in Simla Hill States (British Punjab province era)
Religious group	1901		1911		1921		1931		1941	
Religious group	Pop.	%	Pop.	%	Pop.	%	Pop.	%	Pop.	%
Hinduism (Note: 1931-1941: Including Ad-Dharmis)	373,886	96.03%	386,953	95.7%	292,768	95.45%	317,390	95.93%	345,716	96.16%
Islam	11,535	2.96%	11,374	2.81%	9,551	3.11%	10,017	3.03%	10,812	3.01%
Buddhism	2,223	0.57%	2,709	0.67%	2,052	0.67%	1,308	0.4%	10	0%
Sikhism	1,318	0.34%	2,911	0.72%	2,040	0.67%	1,817	0.55%	2,693	0.75%
Jainism	274	0.07%	172	0.04%	142	0.05%	141	0.04%	126	0.04%
Christianity	113	0.03%	224	0.06%	164	0.05%	176	0.05%	161	0.04%
Zoroastrianism	0	0%	0	0%	0	0%	1	0%	2	0%
Judaism	0	0%	0	0%	0	0%	0	0%	0	0%
Others	0	0%	0	0%	1	0%	0	0%	0	0%
Total population	389,349	100%	404,343	100%	306,718	100%	330,850	100%	359,520	100%
Note1: British Punjab province era district borders are not an exact match in the present-day due to various bifurcations to district borders — which since created new districts — throughout the historic Punjab Province region during the post-independence era that have taken into account population increases. Note2: 1901-1911 census: Including Jubbal, Bashahr, Keonthal, Baghal, Bilaspur, Nalagarh, and other minor hill states. Note3: 1921-1931 census: Including Bashahr, Nalagarh, Keonthal, Baghal, Jubbal, and other minor hill states. Note3: 1941 census: Including Bashahr, Nalagarh, Keonthal, Baghal, Jubbal, Baghat, Kumarsain, Bhajji, Mahlog, Balsan, Dhami, Kuthar, Kunihar, Mangal, Bija, Darkoti, Tharoch, and Sangri states.

== Sources and external links ==
- Indian Princely States website
- Punjab State Gazetteer [then Punjab was much larger], vol. VIII, Gazetteer of the Simla Hill States 1910
- Himachal Pradesh State's official website and various links therefrom (click on map or names) to official sites of the state's districts
