= Bilaspur State (princely state) =

Hill kingdom and later princely state of British India (697–1948)

Coordinates: 31°19′N 76°50′E

- 697–1948
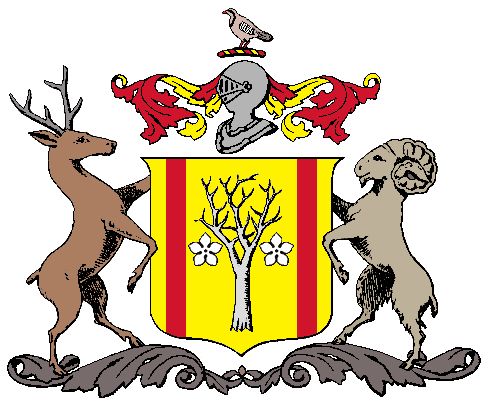
- Flag Coat of arms

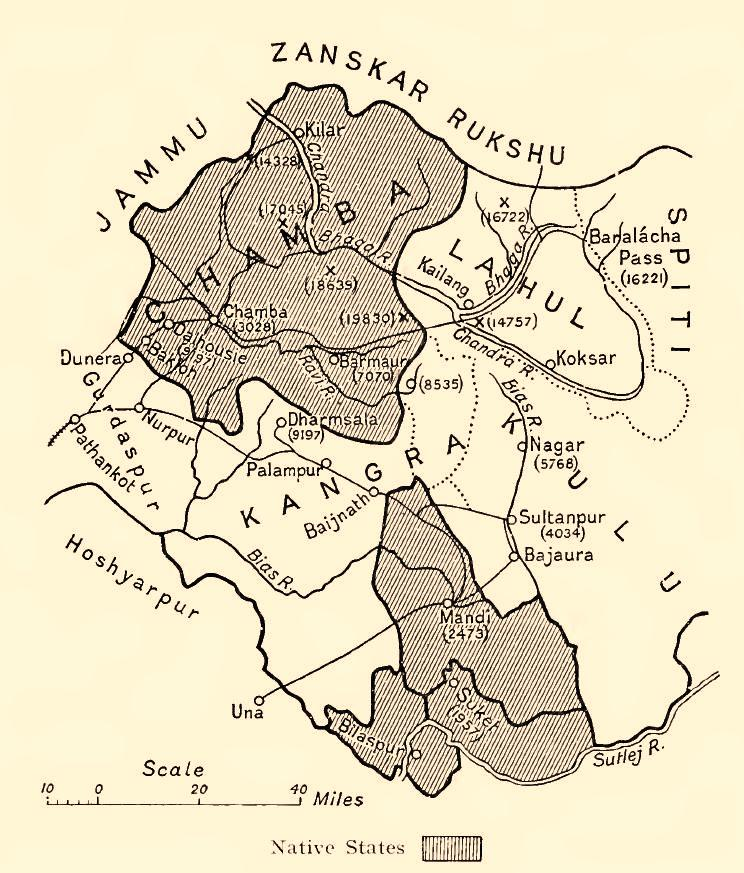
- Princely States of the Shimla Hills, Bilaspur in the south straddling the Sutlej (1911)
- Capital: Bilaspur
- Government: Monarchy
- History
  - Established: 697
  - Disestablished: 1948
Succeeded by
Bilaspur State (1950–1954)
- Today part of: Himachal Pradesh, India

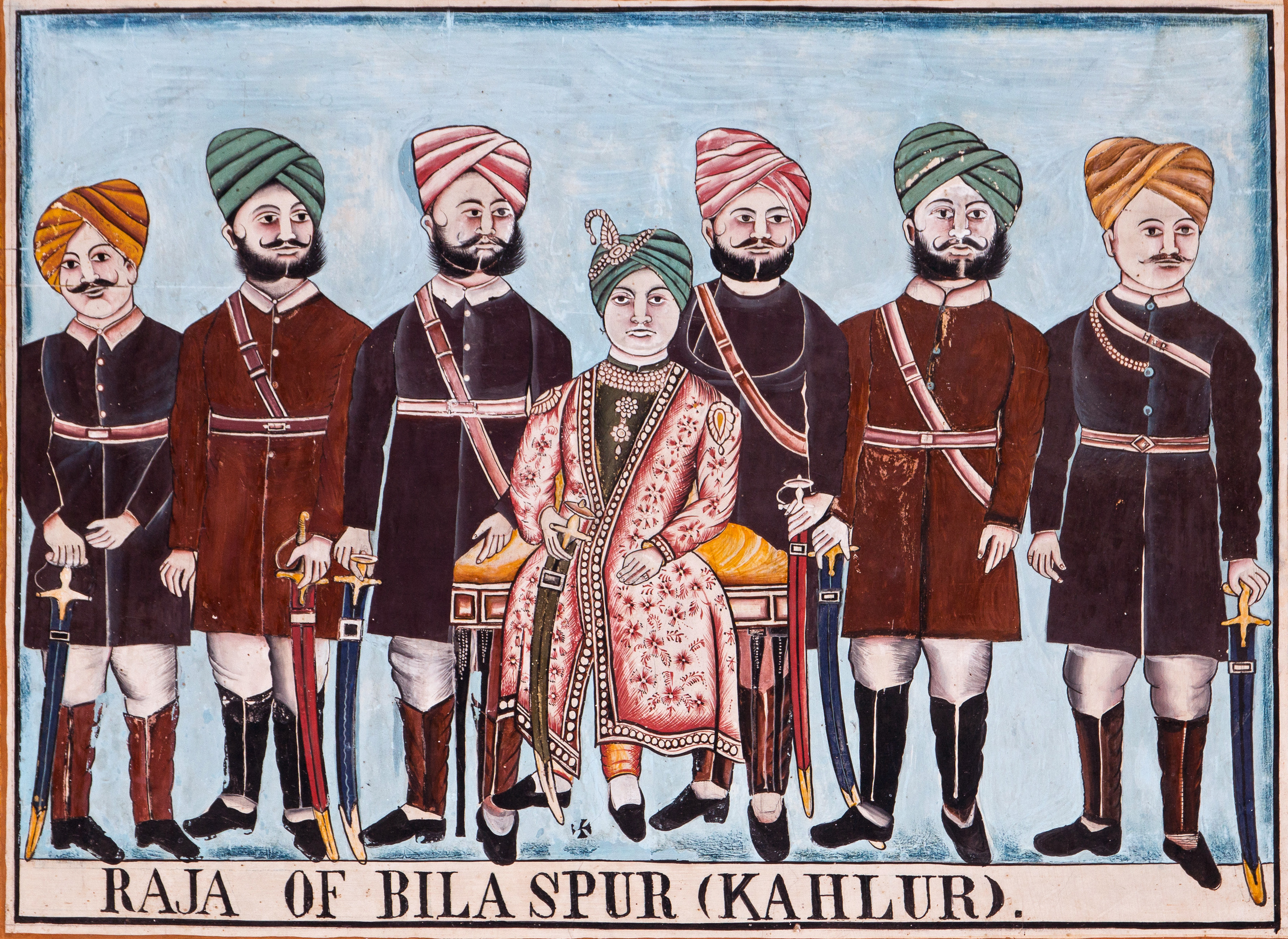
Raja Bijai Chand with other Rajput chiefs.

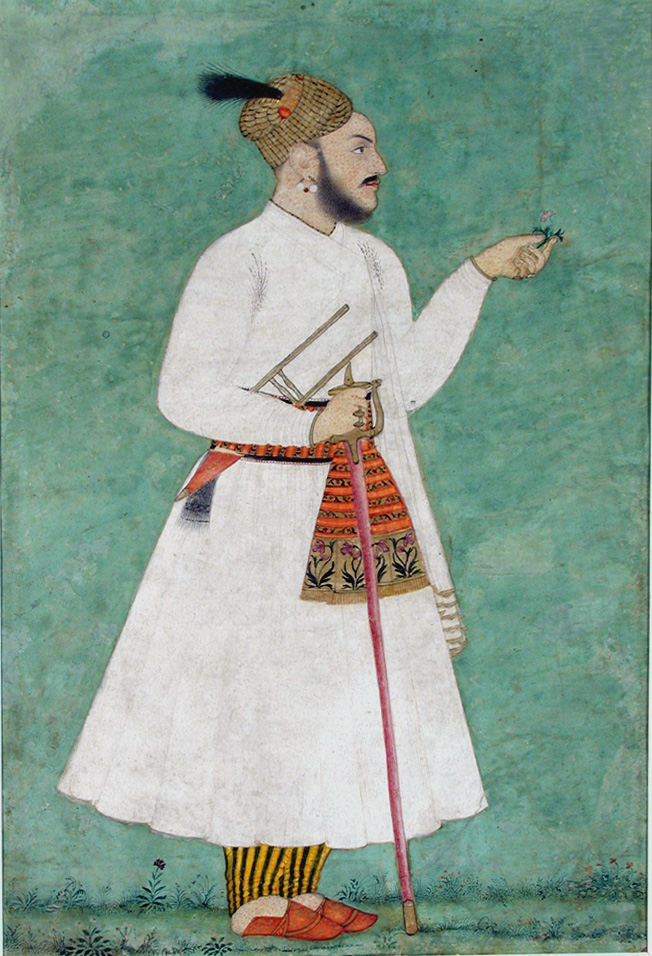
Dan Chand, prince of Bilaspur. Last quarter of the 18th century.

Bilaspur State (or Kahlur State) was a kingdom (697–1815) and later a princely state (1815–1948) under the Punjab States Agency of British India. The state was earlier known as Kahlur and was later renamed Bilaspur. It covered an area of 1,173 km^{2} (453 sq mi) and had a population of 100,994 according to the 1931 Census of India. The last ruler of Bilaspur State acceded to the Indian Union on 12 October 1948. Bilaspur State remained Bilaspur Province in independent India until 1950 when the province was briefly renamed "Bilaspur State" before it was merged with Himachal Pradesh state as a district in 1954.

== History ==
According to local oral tradition and records during the reign of Raja Harihar Chand, a new state was founded around 697 CE by his son First Ruler Raja Bir Chand (697–730). He was born in the Chandel Rajput dynasty, who claimed to be a descendant of Sisupala from the Chandravansha. After Raja Kahal Chand (890–930) had built Kahlur Fort the state was named Kahlur (probably from Kahal-pur) and the ruling Chandel dynasty of Kahlur was also known as Kahluria. Initially the capital of the state was at a place named Jandbari (now in Punjab, India) and then it was transferred to Kahlur Fort, but was later moved permanently to present town Bilaspur by Dip Chand, the 32nd Raja of Kahlur (reigned 1663–1665).

Raja Bhim Chand who succeeded Raja Deep Chand fought Battle of Nadaun against Mughals and came out victorious. Mughals under Alif Khan were supported by Raja of Kangra and Raja Dayal of Bijarwal When Raja Bhim Chand abdicated in 1692 to lead a life of sanyasi the state was at previously unknown heights. The reign of Bhim Chand's son Ajmer Chand was of conquest as well. By the end of his forty years reign the number of states paying tribute was considerable: Baghal State, Baghat, Keonthal, Beja, Mangal, Bhajji, Mahlog, Dhami, Kuthar, Kotkhai, Kunihar, Balsan, and Nehra among others. All continued to pay tribute until Mahan Chand (1778) but by 1790 only Mangal State continued to acknowledge Bilaspur's suzerainty. Since the 18th century the rulers of Bilaspur State patronised artists of the Kangra painting style.

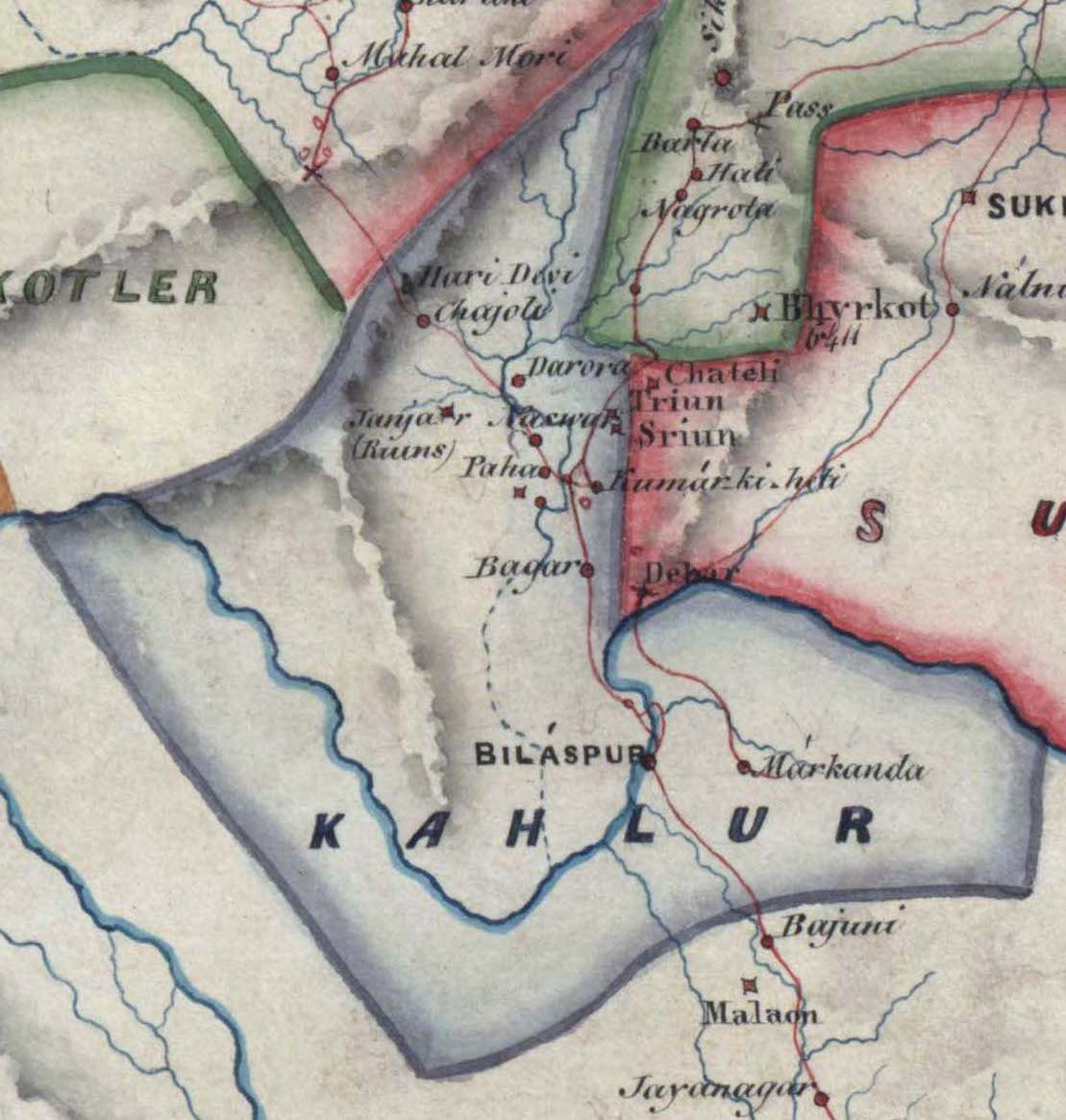
Detail of the territory of Kahlur (Bilaspur) State from a map of the various Hill States of the Punjab Hills region, copied in 1852.

Bilaspur State came under British protection in 1815 under Raja Mahan Chand and became one of the Simla Hill States. Raja Anand Chand was the last ruler of the princely state and Pandit Sant Ram was the last Home Minister. As Bilaspur acceded to India on 28 October 1948, from 26 January 1950 Bilaspur retained an independent identity as a separate province and as a part-C State of India named Bilaspur State. The Raja was appointed commissioner of the State. In following years after Raja resigned, his deputy Chhabra was appointed by govt of India and helped run the temporary government of Bilaspur while the territory of the princely state was politically integrated into the Indian Union.

== Demographics ==
Religious groups in Bilaspur State (British Punjab era)
Religious group	1921		1931		1941	
Religious group	Pop.	%	Pop.	%	Pop.	%
Hinduism (Note: 1931-1941: Including Ad-Dharmis)	96,000	97.96%	99,023	98.05%	108,375	98.22%
Islam	1,559	1.59%	1,458	1.44%	1,498	1.36%
Sikhism	437	0.45%	507	0.5%	453	0.41%
Christianity	4	0%	6	0.01%	7	0.01%
Jainism	0	0%	0	0%	3	0%
Zoroastrianism	0	0%	0	0%	0	0%
Buddhism	0	0%	0	0%	0	0%
Judaism	0	0%	0	0%	0	0%
Others	0	0%	0	0%	0	0%
Total population	98,000	100%	100,994	100%	110,336	100%
Note: British Punjab province era district borders are not an exact match in the present-day due to various bifurcations to district borders — which since created new districts — throughout the historic Punjab Province region during the post-independence era that have taken into account population increases.

== Ruling dynasty ==
Chandel in Bilaspur belong to different branches of the ruling family. These families are numerous, and all enjoyed jagir pensions from state amounting in aggregate to Rs. 40,000 a year in 1933. The chief names are:

- Ajmerchandia
- Kaliyanchandia
- Tarachandia
- Sultanchandia

=== Rajas ===
1. Bir Chand, founder; (r. 697–730)
2. Udhran Chand
3. Jaskarn Chand
4. Madanbrahm Chand
5. Ahl Chand
6. Kahal Chand, 6th Raja;(r. 890–930)
7. Slar Chand
8. Men Chand
9. Sen Chand
10. Sulkhan Chand
11. Kahn Chand, 11th Raja. Conquered Hindur, which he created as a separate realm for his second son.
12. Ajit Chand, 12th Raja (son of Khan Chand)
13. Gokul Chand
14. Udai Chand, (r. 1133–1143)
15. Gen Chand
16. Pruthvi Chand
17. Sangar Chand, (r. 1197–1220)
18. Megh Chand, (r. 1220–1251)
19. Dev Chand
20. Ahim Chand
21. Abhisand Chand, (r. 1302–1317)
22. Sampurn Chand (r. 1317–1355)
23. Rattan Chand (r. 1355–1406)
24. Narandar Chand
25. Fath Chand
26. Pahar Chand
27. Ram Chand
28. Uttam Chand
29. Gyan Chand (r. 1518–1555)
30. Bikram Chand (r. 1555–1593)
31. Sultan Chand (r. 1593–1600)
32. Kalyan Chand (r. 1600–1636)
33. Tara Chand (r. 1636–1653)
34. Dip Chand (r. 1653–1665)
35. Bhim Chand (Kahlur) (r. 1665–1692)
36. Ajmer Chand (r. 1692–1728)
37. Devi Chand (r. 1738–1778)
38. Mahan Chand (r. 1778–1824)
39. Kharak Chand (r. 1824 – March 1839)
40. Jagat Chand (r. March 1839 – 1850)
41. Hira Chand (r. March 1850 – January 1883)
42. Amar Chand (r. January 1883 – January 1889)
43. Bijai Chand (r. 3 February 1889 – 18 February 1927)
44. Anand Chand (r. 18 February 1927 – 12 October 1983)

== Currency ==
No coins from Bilaspur State have been found, and the state may have simply been too small and remote, with little demand for currency, to mint its own. There was little long-distance trade that required currency. Any coins that did circulate in the area were probably originally from elsewhere, such as the Delhi Sultanate. After the British gained influence in the region in the mid-1800s, the British system based on the rupee predominated. For everyday transactions, though, barter was the main way that most people exchanged goods and services.
