= Nalagarh State =

Princely State of India

Nalagarh State नालागढ़ (Hindi)
- 1100–1948
- Government: Hereditary monarchy
- Raja
  - 1100–1171: Ajai Chand (first)
  - 1946–1948: Surendra Singh (last)
- History
  - Founded: 1100
  - Accession to the Union of India: August 1947
  - Merged into PEPSU: 15 July 1948

Area
- 1931: 663.037 km^{2} (256.000 sq mi)

Population
  - 1921: 46,868
- Today part of: Himachal Pradesh

Nalagarh State was a princely state in India during the British Raj. It formed part of the Punjab States Agency. It was also known as Hindur State.

== Area ==
The state included around 331 villages and covered an area of approximately 256 square miles. Two of these villages were in the state of Mahilog.

== Geography ==
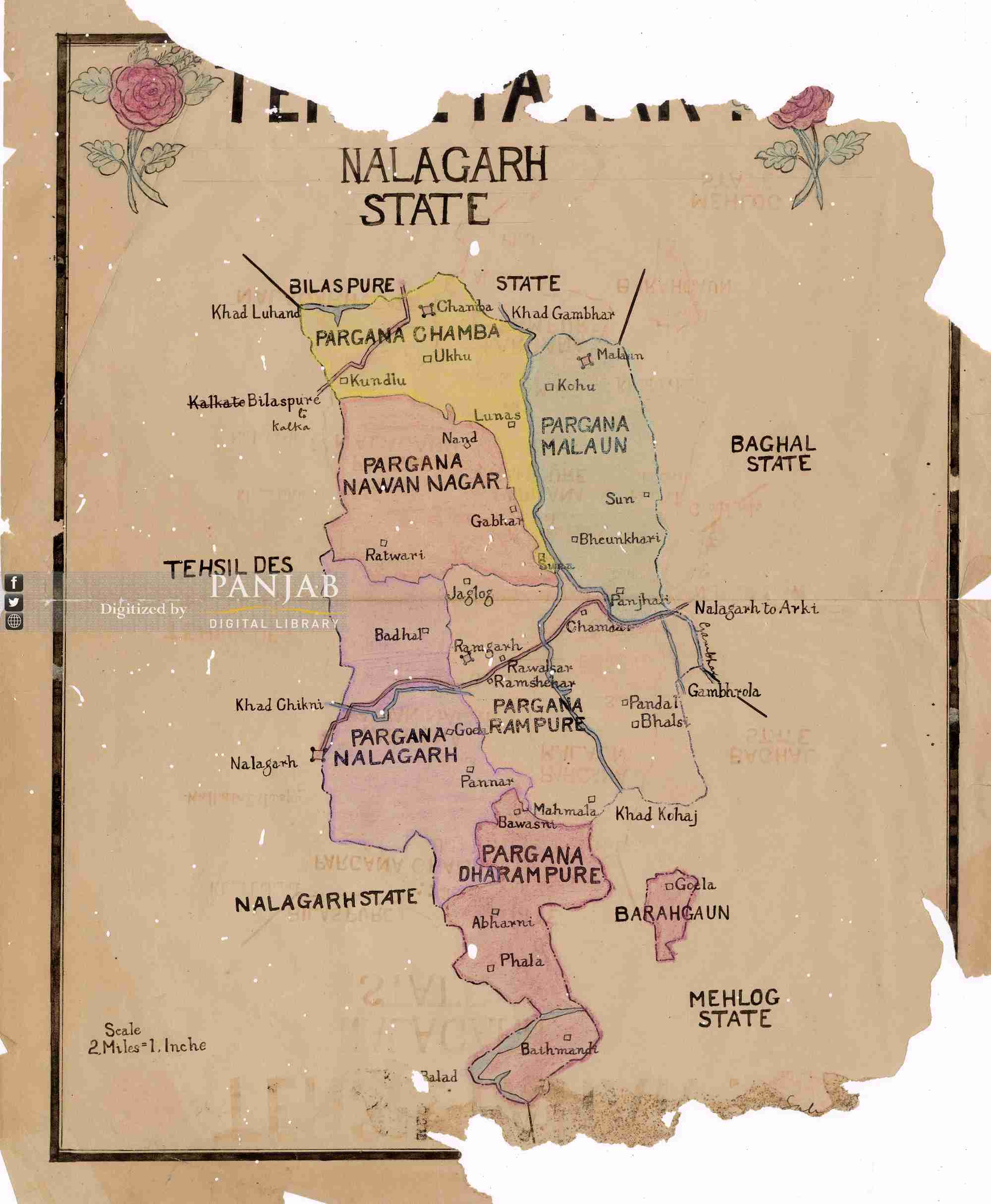
Map of Nalagarh State, divided into parganas

It was bounded on the north by Bilaspur and Hoshiarpur, on the east by Mahilog and Baghal, on the south by Patiala and the Kharar, and on the west by the Rupar. It lay between 30°54′ and 31°14′ N., and 76°39′ and 76°56′ E.

== History ==
Hindur was originally ruled by a Brahmin of the name of Handu. When in the year 1100, Ajai Chand, the eldest son of Kahan Chand, the Raja of Bilaspur, lost his right to his father's throne to his younger brother Ajit Chand, he gathered an army and took a vow to create his own separate principality. Accordingly, he decided to invade the dominions of Handu, and was welcomed in this endeavor by the people of Hindur, who were tired of Handu's unjust and cruel rule. Handu, when he got to know that Ajai's force was near his border, attacked Ajai first with a larger army, but Ajai managed to defeat and kill him. Afterwards, Ajai performed Handu funeral rites and provided for his family. Ajai ruled his new-found kingdom until his death in 1171 and was succeeded by his son Bijai Chand, who at the time of his accession was four months old. Bijai was known for his charitable disposition and for increasing the prosperity of his state. When Bijai died in 1201, his son Dham Singh succeeded him as a minor. Dham was followed by Bajrang Chand, Bajrang by Lachmann Chand, Lachmann by Utal Chand, Utal by Amar Chand, and Amar by Alam Chand. During Alam's reign, the Turco-Mongol conqueror Timur invaded India and on his return in 1399 AD pitched his camp in the open field on the frontier of Hindur. Seeing this, Alam at once repaired and provisioned his forts and, to avoid war, visited Timur in person and offered him a supply of provisions that Timur's army desperately needed. Timur accepted his offer and left Hindur without causing it any harm. Alam was followed by his son Udham Chand on the throne, and Udham in turn by his son Bikram Chand, who established the town of Nalagarh and shifted his capital there. Over time, Nalagarh grew so much in importance that the state of Hindur came to be known as Nalagarh. During the minority of Narain Chand, the Raja of Bilaspur at the instigation of Raja of Nurpur attacked Nalagarh. To effect peace with him, Nalagarh had to surrender its seven forts, which were called Satghara Forts. Narain's successor Ram Chand built the town of Ramshehar, which he made his summer capital, and also built a fort there.

Following the lapse of British paramountcy in India, the then ruler of the state, Surinder Singh, acceded to the Dominion of India. At the time, Surinder was granted by the Government of India a privy purse of Rs. 65,000 per annum, which was to be reduced to Rs. 45,000 per annum for his successors. It was merged with seven other princely states to form the Patiala and East Punjab States Union. This union was inaugurated by Vallabhbhai Patel on 15 July 1948. On 6 September 1970, Surinder ceased to be recognised as the ruler of Nalagarh, after an order in this respect was issued by the President of India, using the powers vested in him through article 366(22) of the Constitution of India.

== Rulers ==
The rulers of Nalagarh represented the elder branch of the family that ruled Bilaspur and belonged to Candravaṃśa who hailed from Chanderi. The ruler was a Rajput of the Chandel family. The ruler enjoyed unrestricted powers except that death sentences passed by him required the confirmation of the superintendent of Hill States. The ruler ranked third in order of precedence among the rulers of Hill States, and eleventh amongst rulers of the Punjab States. The ruler was also entitled to be received by the Viceroy and Governor-General of India.

Rulers were:

Ruler		Life		Reign		Note(s)	Reference(s)
Name	Portrait	Birth	Death	Start Date	End Date	Note(s)	Reference(s)
Raja of Hindur							Reference(s)
Ajai Chand				1100	1171		
Bijai Chand				1171	1201	Greatly increased the internal prosperity of the state.	
Dham Chand				1201	1236		
Bairang Chand				1236	1276		
Lachmann Chand				1276	1306		
Utal Chand				1306	1316		
Jaimal Chand				1316	1338		
Amar Chand				1338	1356		
Alam Chand			1406	1356	1406		
Udham Chand				1406	1421		
Raja of Nalagarh
Bikram Chand				1421	1435	Established his capital at Nalagarh.	
Kidar Chand				1435	1448		
Jai Chand				1448	1477		
Narain Chand				1477	1522		
Ram Chand				1522	1568		
Sansar Chand				1568	1618		
Dharm Chand				1618	1701		
Himmat Chand				1701	1705		
Bhup Chand				1705	1761		
Man Chand				1761	1762		
Gaje Chand				1762	1788		
Ram Saran Singh		1762	1848	1788	1848		
Bije Singh			1857	1848	1857		
Agar Singh		1804	1876	1860	1876		
Ishri Singh		1836	18 September 1911	1876	1911		
Jogendra Singh		1877	1946	1911	1946		
Surendra Singh		13 January 1922	5 May 1971	1946	5 May 1971		
Vijayendra Singh		26 June 1946		5 May 1971	present		

=== Title and style ===
The ruler, or the head of the family, bears the title of Raja, his wife that of Rani, and his heir-apparent that of Tikka.

== Gallery ==
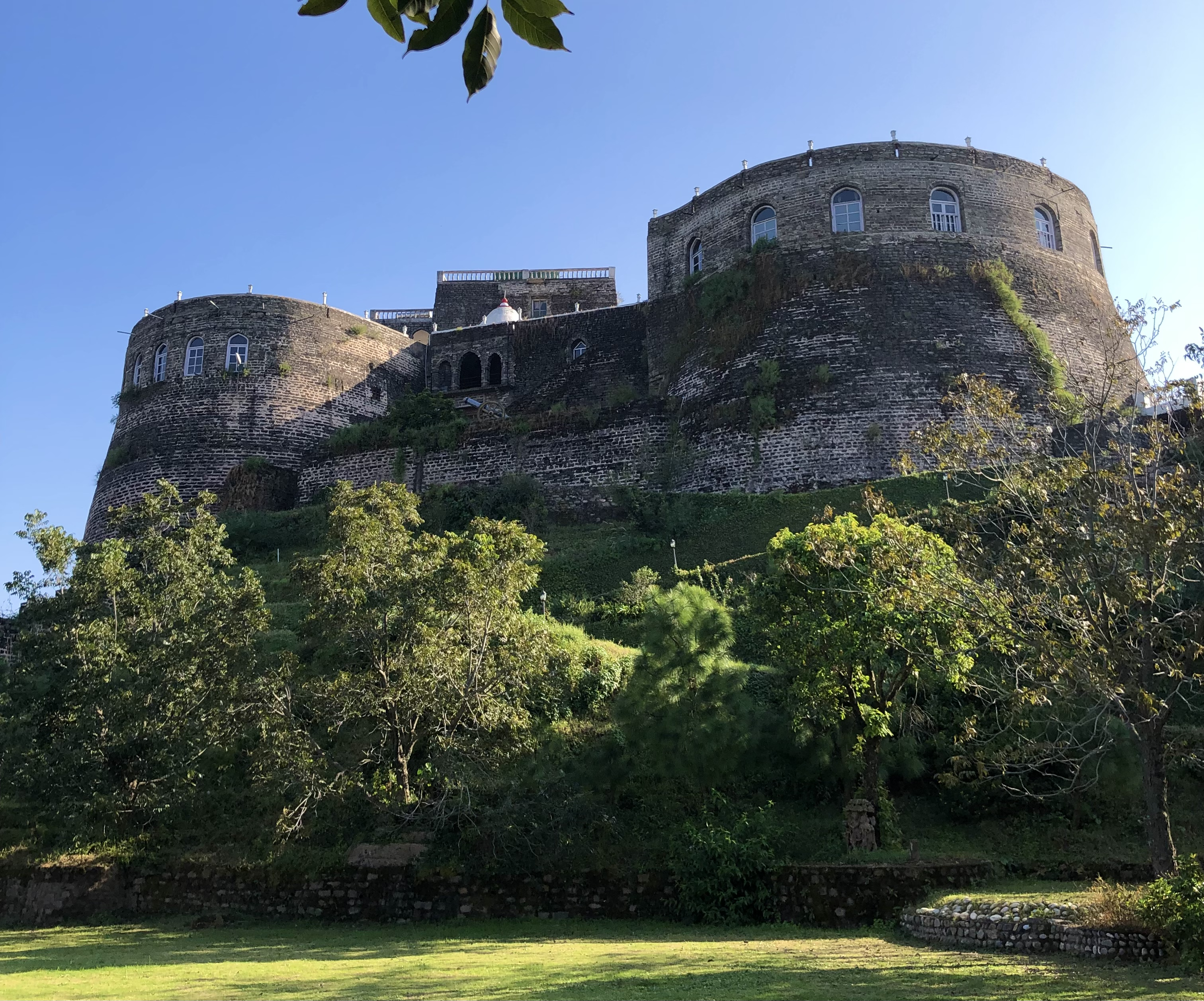
Ramshehar Fort

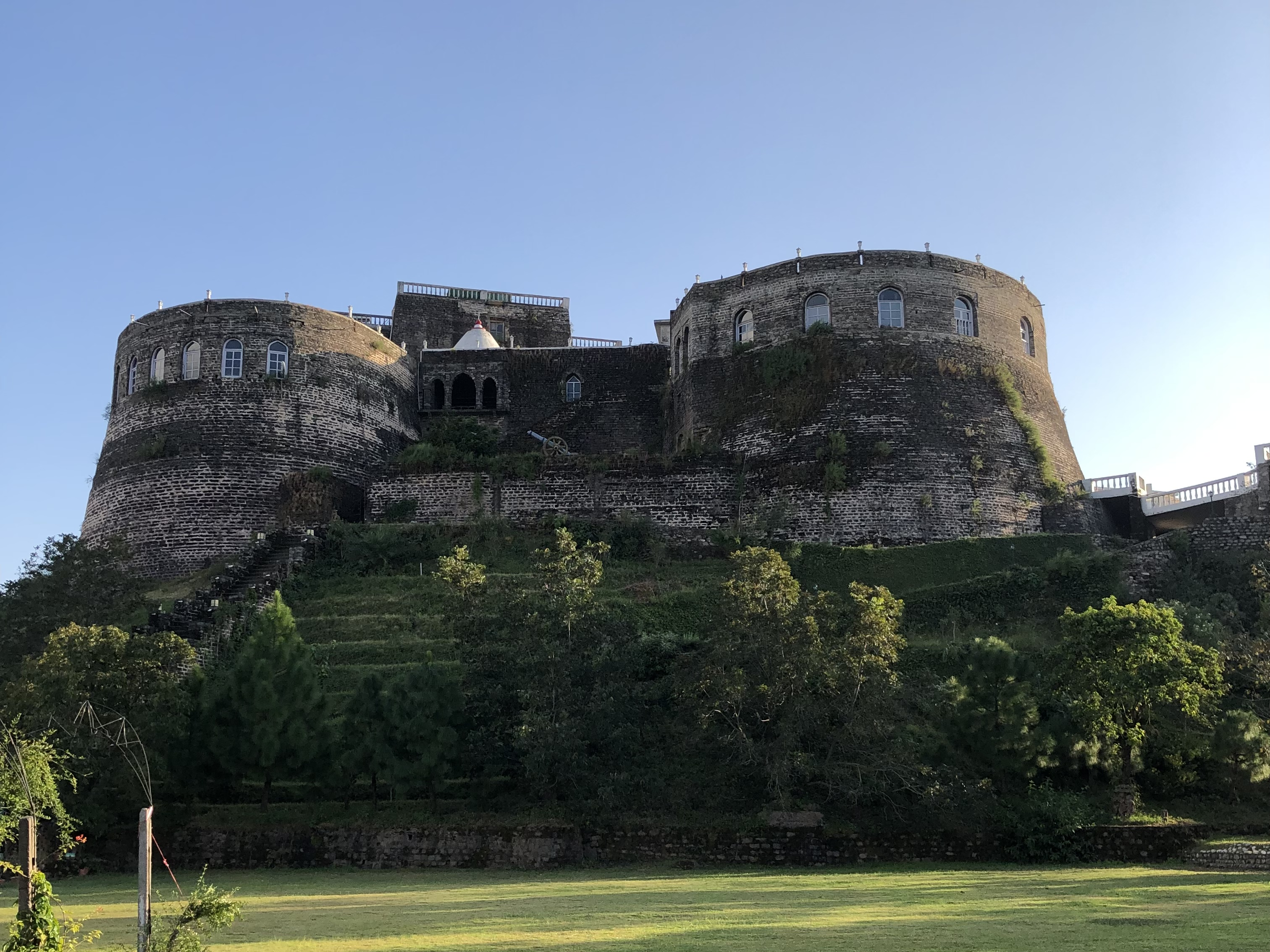
Ramshehar Fort

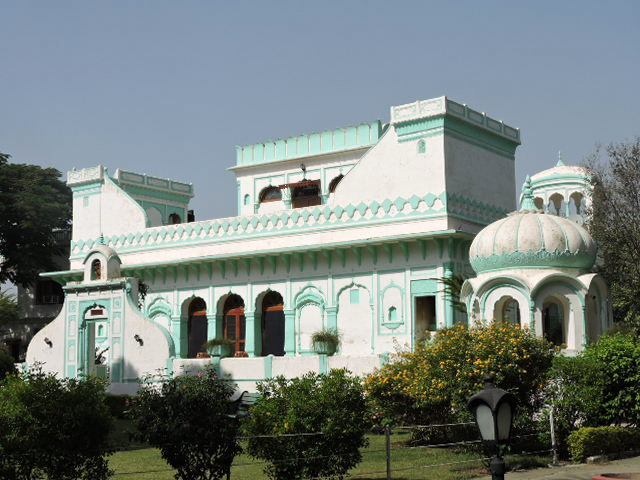
Palace of Nalagarh

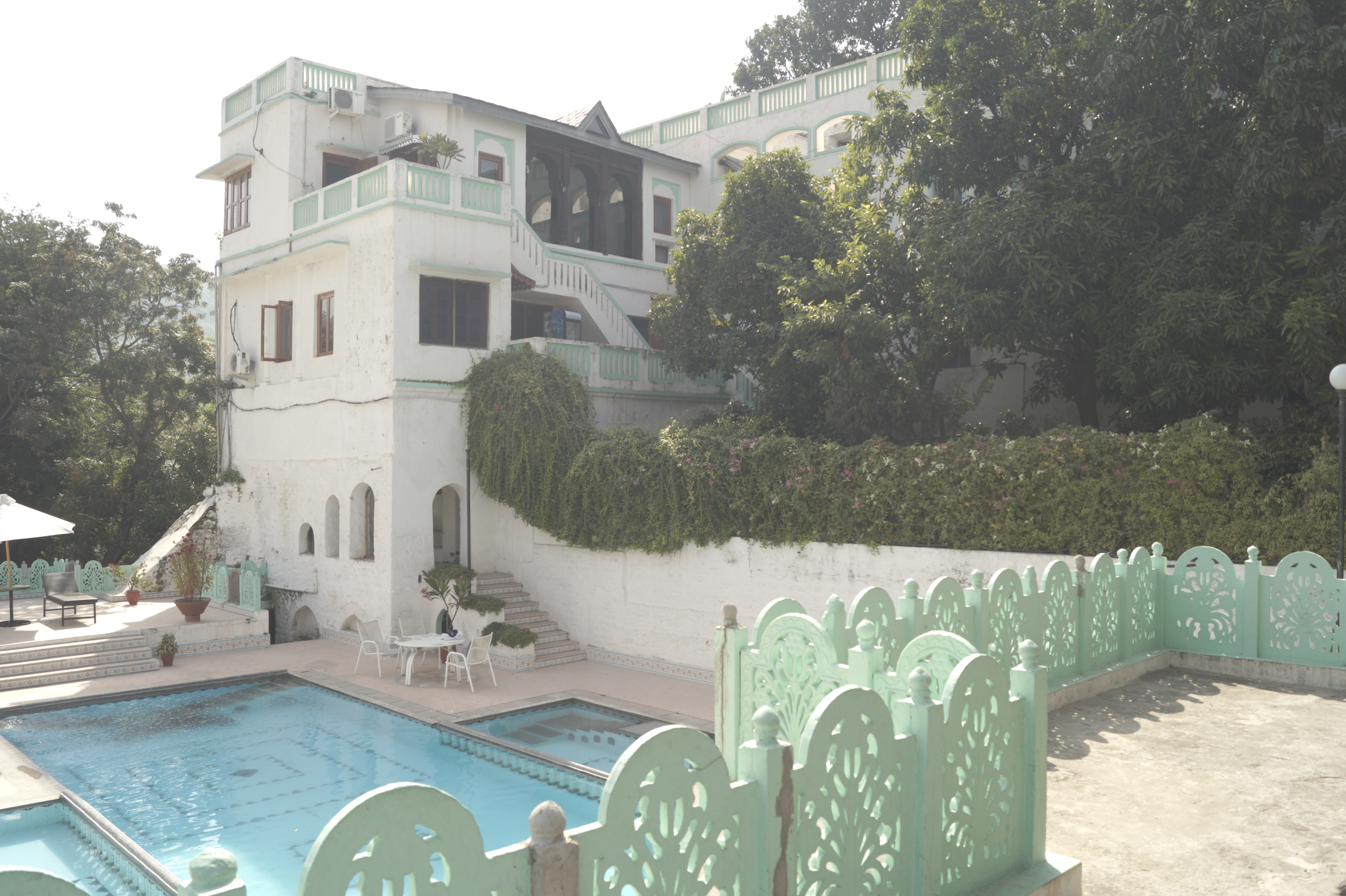
Palace of Nalagarh

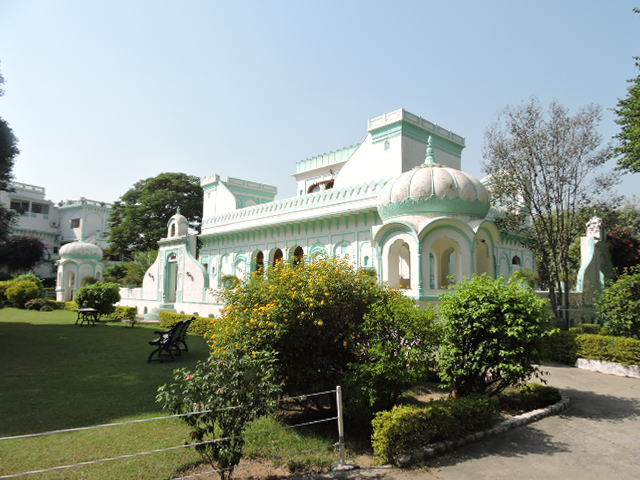
Palace of Nalagarh

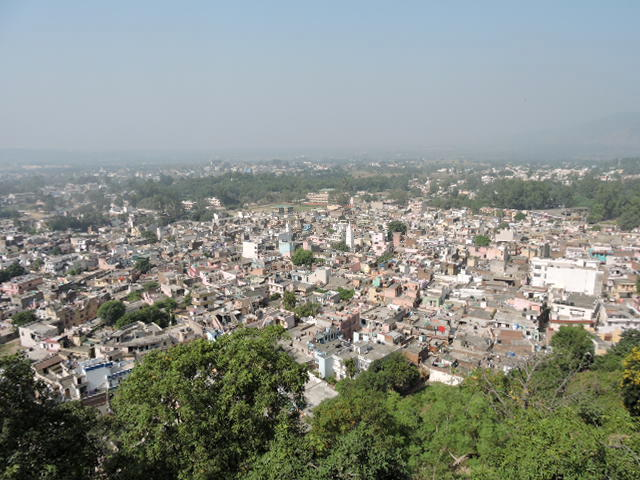
View of city from the Palace of Nalagarh

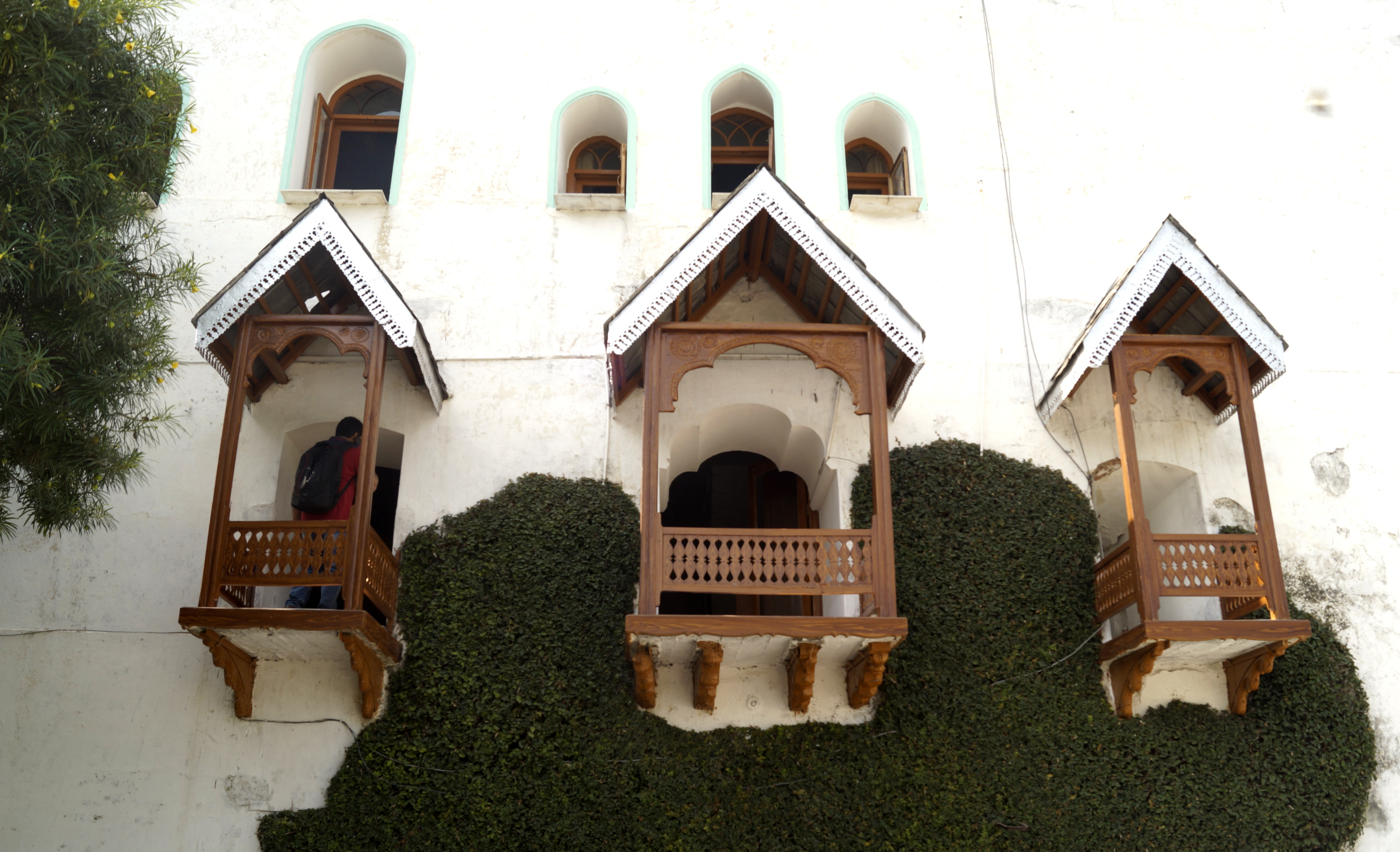
Palace of Nalagarh

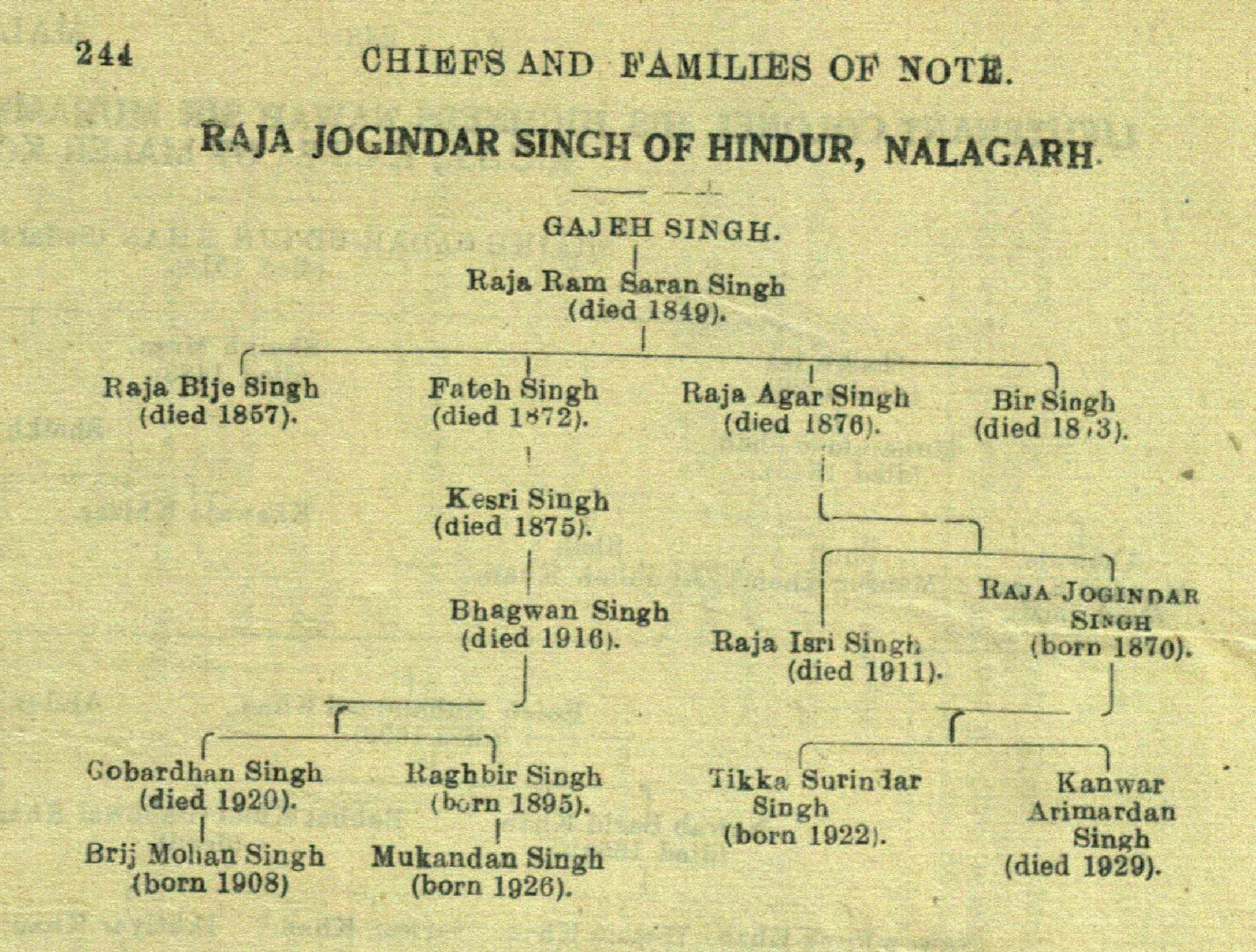
Pedigree of the Rajas of the Nalagarh
