= Jubbal State =

Non-salute princely state of India (?-1948)

Jubbal State was a non-salute state of the Simla Hill States Superintendency of the Punjab States Agency. Thought to have been founded in the twelfth century, it merged with the Indian Union in 1948.

== Area and geography ==
The state covered an area of 297 square miles (770 km^{2}). It was bound on the west by the Paber River and the states of Balsan and Kotkhai, the south by the Sirmur State along the Chor Ridge, the east by the district of Dehra Dun and the north by Bushahr State. It had its capital at Deorha. By the beginning of the 20th century, forests covered almost 40% of the area of the state. Forestry accounted for a bulk of the state's revenues and much of the timber was used as railway sleepers. In 1902–03, annual revenue from forests amounted to 1,00,000 rupees whereas annual land revenue stood at only 35,828 rupees. Wheat, tobacco and opium were the major agricultural products of Jubbal State. The states of Rawingarh and Dhadi were tributary states to Jubbal State.

== Royal family ==
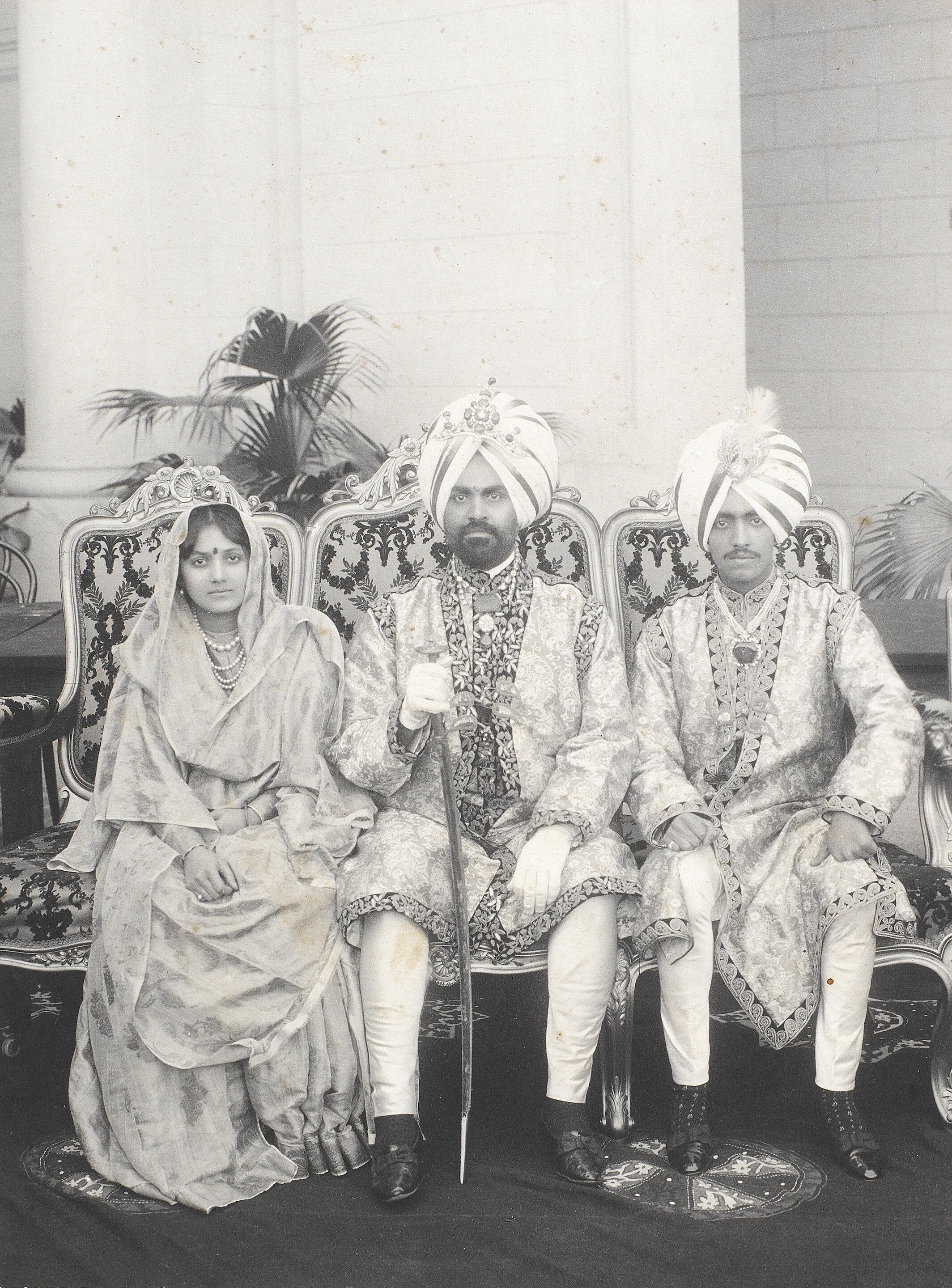
Maharaja Jagatjit Singh of Kapurthala with his son Kunwar Paramjit Singh and daughter-in-law Maharani Brinda Devi Sahiba of Jubbal, ca.1911

The royal family were Rathore Rajputs and its founding ruler Karan Chand was a son of the Raja of Sirmaur. The state was one of twenty hill states collectively called the Thakuraian and the rulers of Jubbal were styled Ranas or Thakurs before the British conferred on them the title of Raja. The heir apparent was styled tikka and the younger sons of the raja were styled kanwar. Succession to the throne was governed by male primogeniture. The goddess Piri Devi was the tutelary deity of the royal family.

=== Rulers of Jubbal State ===
The rulers of the princely state of Jubbal were:

- .... - 1803 : Purana Chandra
- 1803 - 1815 : Nepalese Occupation
- 1815 - 1832 : Purana Chandra (return to power)
- 1832 - 1840 : British Occupation
- 1840 : Purana Chandra (3rd time)
- 1840 - 1877 : Rubin Kazan Chandra
- 1877 - 1898 : Padma Chandra (b. ... - d. 1898)
- 1898 - 29 Apr 1910 : Gyan Chandra (b. ... - d. 1910)

== History ==
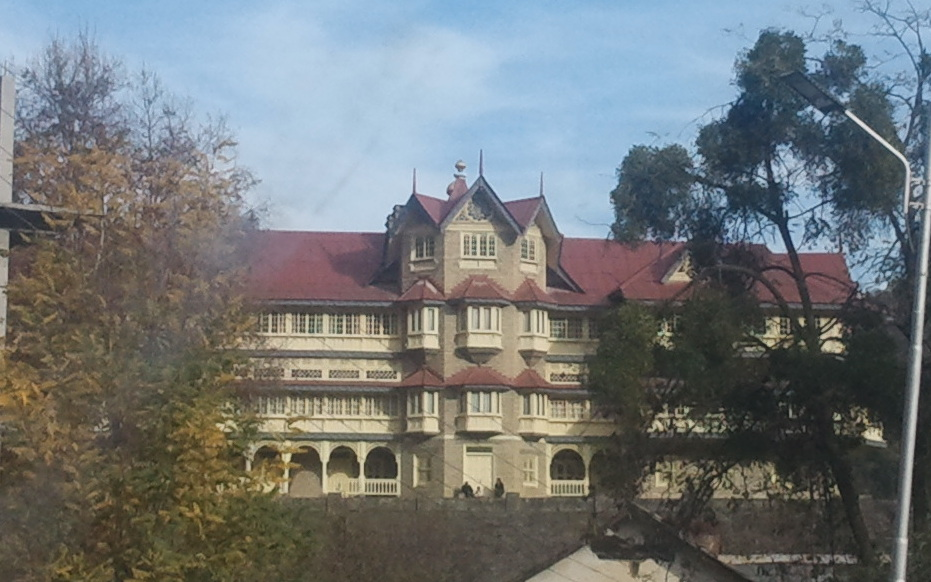
Jubbal Palace at Jubbal

The state was founded by Karan Chand in the twelfth century AD and was a vassal state to Sirmur prior to the Anglo-Gorkha War. In 1815, it was made an independent state by virtue of a sanad issued to its ruler Rana Puran Chand by Lord Moira the Governor-General of India. In 1832, the Rana, Puran Chand abdicated in favour of the British but the kingdom was restored to his son Karam Chand in 1840. Puran Chand committed suicide in 1843. Under Karam Chand's rule, Jubbal emerged as a strong, efficiently run state as he put an end to court intrigues and the overwhelming influence of the state's wazirs. In 1878, Karam Chand was succeeded to the throne by his son Padam Chand who undertook the construction and repair of several Hindu temples in the state. Jubbal had a population of 40,000 and annual revenues of 30,000 rupees in 1880. Padam Chand was succeeded by his brother Bhagat Chand in 1910. For his staunch support of the British war effort in World War I, the hereditary title of Raja was conferred on him in 1918 thereby giving the state ceremonial precedence over those states ruled by Ranas and it ranked ninth in the order of precedence among the hill states of the Punjab. In 1924, a hydro electric plant was established in Jubbal and it became one of the first princely states in India to have electricity. Health and education services were made free by the state and Bhagat Singh also established a college in Shimla for his subjects. Bhagat Chand abdicated in 1946 and was succeeded by Raja Rana Digvijay Chand who became the last regnant monarch of the state. The state merged with the Indian Union in 1948 and the Raja joined the Indian Foreign Service in 1949.
