= Sati Pradha Mela =

Stone pelting fair

Sati Pradha Mela (pattharon ka mela) is an annual fair celebrated in the formerly princely state of Dhami, currently part of the state of Himachal Pradesh, India. The fair is celebrated a day after Diwali in Halog, the erstwhile capital of the princely state, along with members of the Jamog, a neighboring village.

== History ==
The exact date or year of the fair's origin is unknown. The locals believe that the fair goes back a few centuries. Some sources say that the festival originated in the early 18th century when human sacrifice was common in the worship of goddess Kali. The practice was stopped in the later years when a queen of the Rana family of the Dhami kingdom committed sati to prevent human sacrifice and instead asked for the two warring groups to pelt stones at each other, and the blood of the wounded person was to be applied as tilak to the goddess' idol as a symbol of sacrifice.

As per another legend, a girl from the Halog village was engaged to be married to the prince of the Rangoli state but the residents of the Jamog village poisoned the prince right before the wedding was to be solemnized. The girl jumped on the funeral pyre of the prince and committed sati.

== Rituals ==
The fair and festival begins a day after Diwali. Two teams are created: one team consists of the Halogis and clan members from Tundu, Dhagoi, and Katedu, and the second team consists of the Jamogis. Only the village warriors, known as Khunds, and the members of the royal family can participate in the rituals. From the temple seat of god Narsingh located within the Dhami palace, the Halogis take out a procession along with the Jamogis and proceed towards the temple grounds of goddess Kali where the queen is believed to have had committed sati. It is here that both the warrior groups symbolically shower stones at each other from a distance of 160 to 200 meters. The duration could be from a couple of minutes to an hour. Members of the royal family pelt the first stone after completing puja at the temple and it stops only when a person starts bleeding. The blood from the injured person is used to apply tilak on the idol of the goddess. People from Shimla and adjoining villages come to watch the rituals.

Women are allowed to participate as spectators only. Local police and doctors are available in modern times to manage the crowd and treat the injured. The royal family of Dhami, along with local members, continues to oversee and organize the fair and its traditions through their local committee.

== Fair ==
Apart from the traditional fair customs and rituals, exhibition of farming equipment and artefacts are also organized during the time to give a boost to the local economy and improve the livelihood of local potters, artisans, and farmers.

For the first time in almost 250 years, the Sati Pradha Mela was paused due to the COVID-19 pandemic in 2020. All rituals, possessions, gatherings, and exhibitions were brought to a halt.
