= Baragaon, Himachal =

Baragaon
- Village
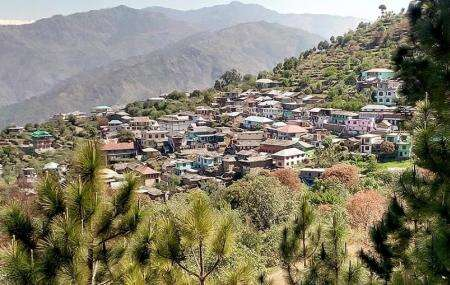
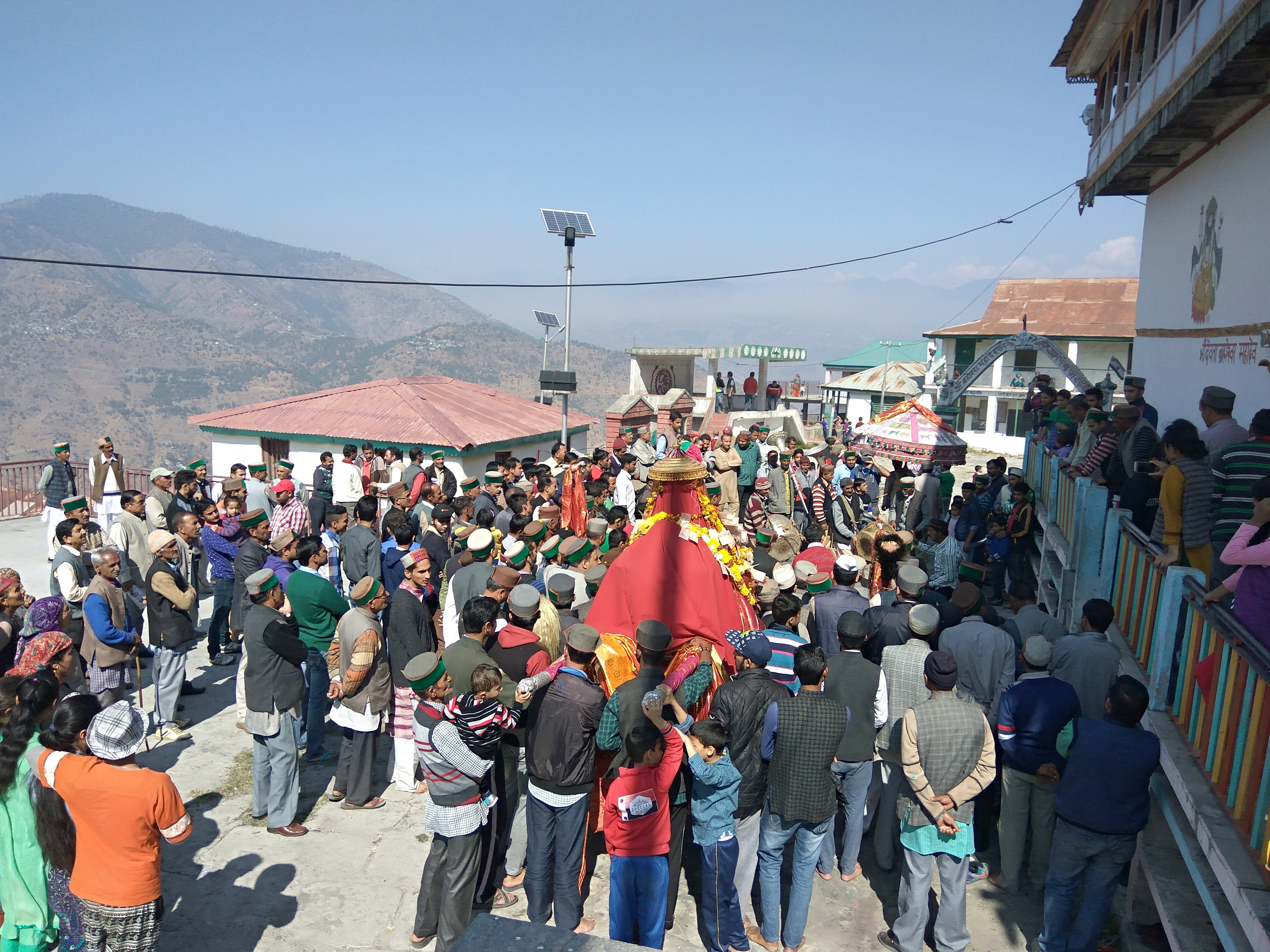
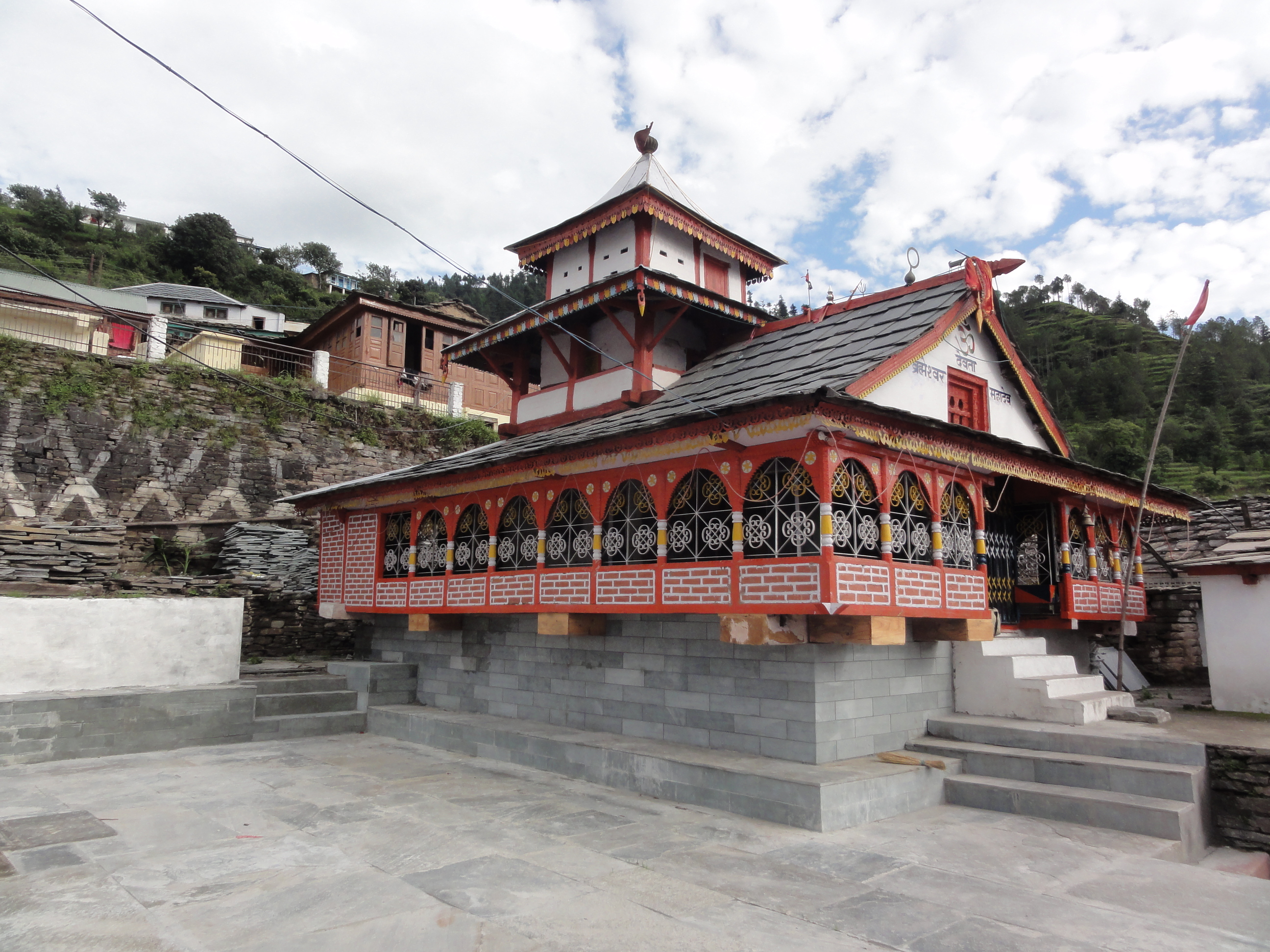
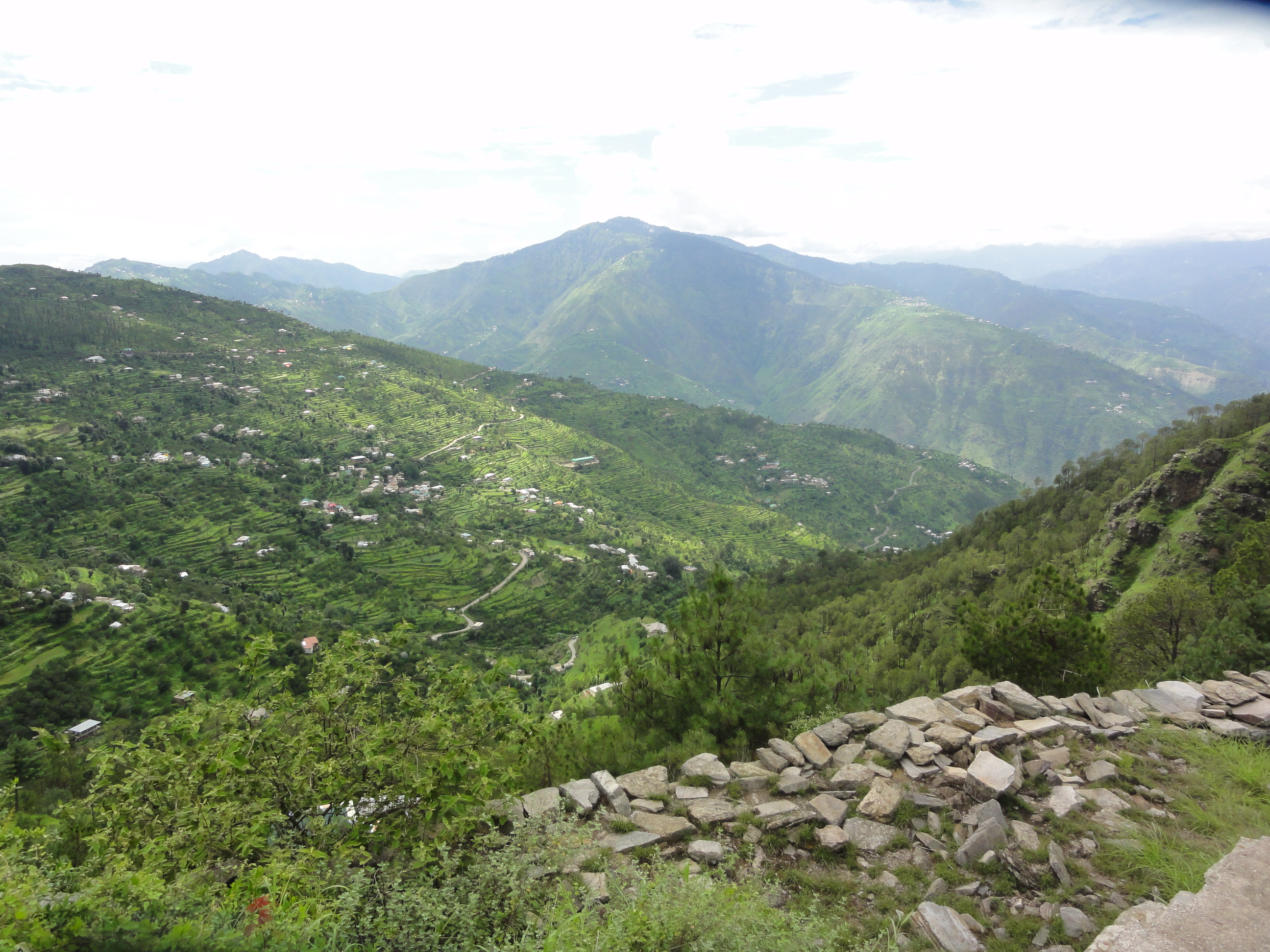
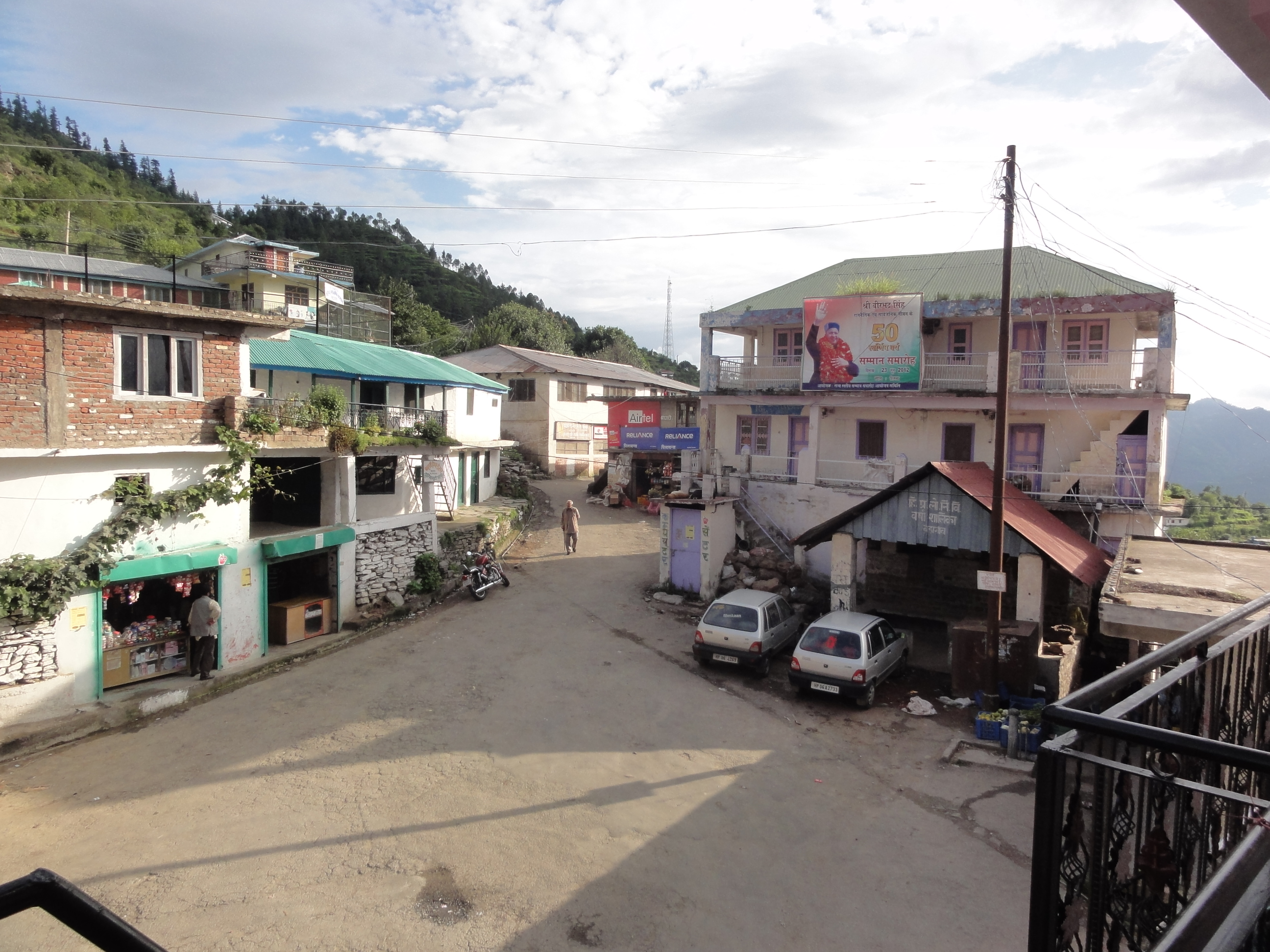
- Clockwise from top: View of Baragaon Village; Brahmeshwar Mahadev temple; Main Bus Stand and Shops in Baragaon; View of Apple Orchards from Sangri Fort; Baragaon Diwali Fair

- Location in Himachal Pradesh, India Baragaon (India)
- Coordinates: 31.343°N 77.373°E
- Country: India
- State: Himachal Pradesh
- District: Shimla
- Tehsil: Kumarsain

Government
  - Type: Panchayati raj
  - Body: Gram panchayat
- Elevation: 1,650 m (5,410 ft)

Population (2011)
  - Total: 842

Languages
  - Official: Hindi
  - Regional: Mahasu Pahari (Shodochi)
- Time zone: UTC+5:30 (IST)
- PIN: 172027
- Vehicle registration: HP-95

Baragaon is a village situated in the Kumarsain subdivision of Shimla district in the Indian state of Himachal Pradesh.

Formerly under the British Raj, it was the capital of Sangri princely state, which was one of the several states of the Punjab States Agency.

== History ==
Sangri originally was part of Bushahr, but was seized by Raja Man Singh of Kullu in about 1703. It was taken back by Bushahr in 1719 but in 1803 it was seized by the Gurkhas of Nepal and restored in 1815 to Raja Bikram Singh of Kullu after Gurkhas left. After Kullu was annexed by British in 1846 after First Anglo-Sikh War, Sangri became princely state under Shimla Hill states.

Sangri signed merger treaty with the Indian Union on 15 April 1948

== Accessibility ==
Baragaon is 91 km from Shimla city and lies 8 km beside National Highway 5 from Kingal village on Kingal - Basantpur road. Nearest Airport and Railway station are at Shimla city and there are regular Bus services from Shimla to Baragaon.

== Government ==
It is Gram Panchayat under Narkanda Block.

In Himachal Pradesh Legislative Assembly it is represented under Theog Assembly constituency .

In Loksabha it is represented under Shimla loksabha seat.

On 16 August 2022, Himachal CM declared Baragaon to be new Sub Tehsil under Kumarsain.

On 21 December 2022, Himachal CM denotified all sub tehsil including Baragaon created by previous government.

== Education ==
- Government Senior Secondary school (Established in 1922 by rulers of Sangri and upgraded later. Renamed after Kargil War Martyr Shaheed Satish Kumar from Baragaon)
