= Dhami State =

Princely state of the British Raj

Coordinates: 31°58′36″N 76°03′03″E

- Princely State
- 1815–1948
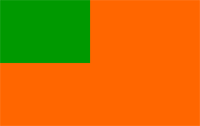
- Flag
- Capital: Halog
- Area
  - 1941: 73 km^{2} (28 sq mi)
- Population
  - 1941: 5,114
- History
  - Established: 1815
  - Independence of India: 1948
Succeeded by
India

Dhami was a Princely State situated 26 kilometres (16 mi) west of Shimla, India. Its capital was Halog and the state formed a part of the region known as the Punjab Hill States Agency during the British Raj period. In 1941 it had an area of 73 square kilometres (28 sq mi) and a population of 5,114 people. In 1948 Dhami was made a part of Himachal Pradesh.

== History ==
They were the only Chauhan Rajput rulers in the region and had settled there after being forced from Delhi by the invasion of Muhammad of Ghor in the twelfth century AD. They were feudatories of the Bilaspur State (princely state) until 1815, when the East India Company formally recognised the state as an independent entity with the issue of a sanad (deed). The recognition was granted as a consequence of the support offered by the rulers to the British in their successful attempt to remove Gurkha influence from the Shimla Hills in 1803–1815 when Dhami was occupied by Nepal. The Dhami ruler who had formulated this policy was Rana Govardhan Singh, who maintained his support through the Indian rebellion of 1857 and until his death in 1867. The tribute exacted from the state was halved after 1857 in recognition of this, with the privilege being granted for his lifetime.

The successor to Govardhan Singh was Fateh Singh, his son, to whom the authorities of what was now the British Raj extended a similar concession with regard to the tribute from 1880. Fateh was in turn succeeded by his son, Hira Singh, in 1894 and the concession was granted once more. Hira was also made a Companion of the Order of the Indian Empire (CIE) in recognition of his support of the British cause during World War I. The last formally recognised Rana was Dalip Singh, who succeeded his father, Hira, in 1920 and died in 1987. Subsequent to Indian independence from United Kingdom, the princely states ceased to exist.

=== Rulers ===
The rulers of Dhami bore the title 'Rana'.

- 1815 – 1868 Govardhan Singh (b. c.1802 – d. 1868)
- 1868 – 1894 Fateh Singh (b. 1855 – d. 1894)
- 1894 – Jan 1920 Hira Singh (b. 1878 – d. 1920)
- Jan 1920 – 15 Aug 1947 Dhalip Singh (b. 1908 – d. 1987)

== See also ==
- List of Rajput dynasties
- Political integration of India
- Sati Pradha Mela
