= Baghat =

Former Indian princely state

Coordinates: 30.525°N 80.645°E

Baghat State बघाट
- Princely State
- Late 15th/early 16th century–1948
- Capital: Solan
- Area
  - 1901: 93 km^{2} (36 sq mi)
- Population
  - 1901: 9,490
- History
  - Established: Late 15th/early 16th century
  - Independence of India: 1948
Succeeded by
India

Baghat was a princely state of the British Raj, located in modern-day Himachal Pradesh. It constituted one of the Simla Hill States. It consisted of three separate parts which were almost entirely surrounded by the larger Patiala territory. The largest part comprised approximately 22 square miles (57 km^{2}), extending eastward from Solan. It incorporated Takroli, Bhocháli and part of the Básál parganas. The two smaller parts comprised about 10 square miles (26 km^{2}) and 1 square mile (2.6 km^{2}) respectively, and formed the remainder of the Básál pargana.

The first capital of the state was Jaunaji, located 6 miles from Solan, 2nd Bhoch, in the pargana of Bhocháli. It was shifted in 1875 to Solan, which had a station on the Kálka–Simla railway.

== Etymology ==
The name "Baghat" is commonly said to be derived from bau or bhau, said to be a hill-tribe word meaning many, and ghát, the word for a pass. Another theory suggests that it is instead a corruption of bára ghát, meaning twelve gháts. This is owed to the large number of places in the area called ghát.

== Geography ==
The state lay between 30°50' and 30°55' N, and between 76°63' and 76°66' E. The region's main drainage basins are the Aswni Khad, a tributary of the Giri, and the Gambhar, a tributary of the Sutlej. The landscape is mountainous. The town of Solan was located on the highest range, which runs through what was the northern portion of the state from southwest to northwest.

== History ==
=== Early history ===
The founder of the state and ruling family of Baghat is recorded variously as Basant Pál or Hari Chand Pál from Dharánágri in the Deccan region. According to legend, Basant captured a small place in the hills of the Keonthal pargana of Patiála, which he subsequently named Basantpur, and which later came to be called Bassi. This settlement, located around six miles (10 km) from Solan, was inherited by his son Bakhsh Pál, who later annexed the parganas of Básál, Bhocháli and Bharauli from Patiála.

The 8th rana, Bhawáni Pál, annexed the Bachhráng pargana and the territory of the Rana of Kasauli. The 16th rana, Indar Pál, who is credited with naming the state Baghát, also captured the parganas of Básál, Ghár and Taksál from Patiála.

The 68th ruler of Baghát, Rana Janmi Pál, is stated to have been an illustrious man. According to legend, he was presented with a khillat from the emperor in Delhi. On his way home, he was attacked by the Rai of Bhawána and his forces. The rai's army was defeated and the rai himself was killed, whereupon Janmi Pál became the suzerain of Bhawána. Upon the succession of the 73rd ruler, Rana Dalel Singh, the family thenceforth adopted the honorary suffix Singh instead of Pál.

=== British period ===
Rana Mahindar Singh, the son of Dalel Singh, is the first ruler for which historians have written records. During his reign, in 1790, Baghát regained its independence from Biláspur, to which it appears to have been subjugated to for an unknown period of time. This occurred when Biláspur entered into a disastrous war with Nálagarh. Baghát continued, however, as Biláspur's ally.

During the Gurkha War, Mahindar Singh was a strong opponent of rising British power in the region. With the British victory, five of the rana's eight parganas were transferred to Patiála for a payment of Rs. 130,000. The remaining three parganas of Básál, Bhocháli and Takroli were returned to Mahindar Singh.

In 1739, Mahindar Singh died without issue, whereupon Baghát was treated as a lapsed state by the British. A pension to the amount of Rs. 1,282 was assigned to the royal family and the state was formally annexed to British India.

In 1842, upon the request of Ummed Singh, a grandson of the late rana Dalel Singh, Lord Ellingham restored the state of Baghát to Bije Singh, the younger brother of the late rana. However, in 1849, he too died without leaving a direct heir, and the state again was deemed lapsed and was annexed according to the doctrine. Ummed Singh then established a claim to the throne for himself, and pleaded his case before the Court of Directors. It was initially rejected, but eventually in 1861, upon the recommendation of Lord Canning, the claim was recognised by the court. Ummed Singh received the news on his death bed, and nominated his son, Dalip Singh, as his successor.

In January 1862, a sanad was issued conferring the state of Baghát on Dalip Singh, then a child of two years. The restoration saw a significant reduction in tribute paid by the state to the British Raj, due to the outright deduction of territory returned.

==== Rulers ====
The rulers bore the title of Rana.

- Rana Mohindar Singh (b. ... - d. 1839) 1803 – 1839
- Rana Bije Singh (b. ... - d. 1849) 1842 – 1849
- Rana Umaid Singh (b. 1825 - d. 1861) 1861
- Rana Dhalip Singh (b. 1859 - d. 1911) 15 Jan 1862 – 30 Dec 1911
- Rana Durga Singh (b. 1901 - d. 1977) 1912 – 4 Jun 1928
- Raja Durga Singh (s.a.) 4 Jun 1928 – 15 Aug 1947

=== Partition period ===
The last ruler of Baghát was Durga Singh, who succeeded his father in 1911 as a minor. In June 1928, he was accorded the hereditary title of Raja. Raja Durga Singh acceded his state to the Union of India on 15 April 1948. He died in 1977. The current head of the Baghát lineage is his grandson, Keshvinder Singh, who succeeded on 27 April 2004.

== See also ==
- List of Indian princely states

== Bibliography ==
- "7: Baghat State Gazetteer". Gazetteer of the Simla Hill states. Indus Publishing Company. 1910. ISBN 978-81-7387-033-0.
