= Mangal State =

Coordinates: 32.24°N 76.08°E

Mangal is a former princely state in north India ruled by Chandravanshi Sen Rajputs.Mangal state like Mandi State was an offshoot of Suket State. Rana Surender Singh is its present head.

Its territory, presently in Himachal Pradesh, was only 33.6 km2, with a population of 1,227 in 1901.

== History ==
Founded in the early 16th century after the death of Shri Mangal Chand, Rana of Bhatwara. Batwara region lay on bank of Satluj river. Rana of Batwara expelled by Raja Madan Sen of Suket State because he allied with Raja Megh Chand Chandel of Kahlur in 1240. After expulsion, Rana Batwara was loyal to Raja of Bilaspur's generations and regained his lost territory. Rana Batwara was killed by Raja Shyam Sen of Suket and Raja Man Chand Guleria of Guler whilst he was worshiping in Batwara Palace, forcing two Ranis, the Wazir, other officials, along with the Tikka Sahib, Raghunath Chand, to fled from Batwara. Later, he founded the new state of Mangal, naming in his father's memory Rana Mangal Chand, crowned by Raja of Bilaspur. The state was occupied by the Nepal 1803/1815. Rana of Mangal lost his large area portion (Batwara, Kol, Baddu) in 19th century due to bad relationship with British Raj. It was one of the most inaccessible states. Local deity are Badu Bada Devta, Baba Nahar Singh, Guga Jahar Peer, Baba Balak Nath, Jalapa Devi, Chamunda. Ranked 10th in order of precedence Shimla hill states. On 20 December 1815 it entered the British Raj by accepting a protectorate, restoring its autonomy, now within British India, colonially controlled under the Simla Hill States Superintendency of the Punjab States Agency.

Although its revenue was only 700 rupees, a private purse of 3000 rupees was awarded to the ruling Ranas.

Its separate existence ended at its accession to the then Chief Commissioner's Province of Himachal Pradesh, and hence to independent India, on 15 April 1948. Present head Rana Surender Singh lives in New Delhi and has three issues Tikka Someshwar Singh, Kunwar Dineshwar Singh and Kunwar Lokeshwar Singh

== Rulers ==
The rulers bore the title of Rana.

- ?-? Raghunath Singh (1240-)
- ?-? Pratap Singh
- ?-? Kripal Chand
- ?-? Sartam Chand
- ?-? Man Chand
- ?-? Gulab Chand
- ?-? Tara Chand
- ?-? Sansar Chand
- ?-? Jai Singh
- ?-? Chittar Singh
- ?-? Inder Singh
- ?-? Veer Singh
- ?-? Amar Singh
- ?-? Karam Singh
- ?-? Bahadur Singh
- 1803 - 1815 occupied by Nepal
- 1815 - 1844 Prithvi Singh (d. 1844)
- 1844 Jodha Singh (d. 1844)
- 9 Nov 1844 - 1892 Ajit Singh (b. 1830 - d. 1892)
- 1892 - 1920 Trilok Singh (b. 1859 - d. 1920)
- 1920 - 15 August 1947 Shiv Singh (b. 1888 - d. 1953)
- 1953 - 1973 Ranbir Singh (d. 1973)
- 1973 - Surinder Singh (born 11 October 1957)

== Sources and external links ==
- Indian princely States on uq.net.au as archived on web.archive.org; with genealogy
- World Statesmen - India - princely States K-Z
