= Bhajji State =

Coordinates: 31°24′N 77°12′E

Bhajji State भज्जी
- Princely State
- Late 18th century–1948
- Capital: Seoni
- Area
  - 1901: 248 km^{2} (96 sq mi)
- Population
  - 1901: 13,309
- History
  - Established: Late 18th century
  - Independence of India: 1948
Succeeded by
India

Bhajji state was a protected tributary state in the hills of Simla, now Himachal Pradesh, under the government of Punjab. Its area was 248 km² and the population (1881) of 12,106 and 1901 of 13,309 consisted almost entirely of Sikhs distributed in 327 villages. The annual tribute was 144 pounds. The capital was Seoni, on the banks of the Sutlej.

Gopi Chand ruled the state till he died in 1777. Thakurs, Chand Pal and Jhajar Chand ruled before him.

Later, the Pal dynasty of Rajput origin ruled it with the title of Rana. The founder of the dynasty was a brother of the Raja of Kutlehar and came from Kangra; he acquired the territory by conquest. The country was conquered by the Gurkhas between 1803 and 1815 but they were expelled by the British who confirmed the old dynasty by a sanad dated 4 September 1815. Under the British protectorate, death sentences imposed by the Rana required British confirmation. In 1842 the Rana Rudra Pal abdicated in favor of his son and retired to Haridwar. A century later Bir Pal did the same.

A 139-year-old temple of Bathelnu was a wooden structure. The people of Bhajji State visit the place to propitiate the Devta.

== List of rulers ==
- Raja Amrit Pal ?-1803
- Rana Rudra Pal 1803
- Gurkha occupation 1803–1815
- Rana Rudra Pal (second time) 1815–1842
- Rana Ran Bahadur Singh (son) 1842–1875
- Rana Durga Singh (son) 1875–1913
- Rana Bir Pal (son) 1913–1940
- Rana Ram Chandra Pal Sing (son) 1940–1948

== See also ==
- Kutlehar.
