= Darkoti =

Coordinates: 31°07′N 77°38′E

Darkoti State दार्कोटी
- Princely State
- 11th century–1948
- Area
  - 1901: 13 km^{2} (5.0 sq mi)
- Population
  - 1901: 518
- History
  - Established: 11th century
  - Independence of India: 1948
Succeeded by
India
- Today part of: Himachal Pradesh, India

Darkoti State was one of the Princely states of India during the period of the British Raj. Its last ruler signed the accession to the Dominion of India on 15 April 1948. Currently, it lies in Kharapatthar in Shimla district and is part of the Indian state of Himachal Pradesh.

== History ==
According to legend the state of Darkoti was founded during the 11th century by Raja Durga Singh Kachhwaha, of the Kachhwaha Rajput clan. It was occupied by the Gurkhas of Nepal from 1803 to 1815 when they were expelled by the British. After the occupation ended it became a British protectorate.

=== Rulers ===
The rulers of Darkoti bore the title 'Rana'.

=== Ranas ===
- ... – 1787 ...
- 1787 – ... Bal Ram
- ... – 1815 Jathu Ram
- 1815 – 1854 Sutes Ram (d. 1854)
- 1854 – 1856 Paras Ram (d. 1856)
- 1856 – 1883 Ram Singh (b. 1815 – d. 1883)
- 15 Oct 1883 – 24 Sep 1918 Ramsaran Singh (b. 1843 – d. 1918)
- 24 Sep 1918 – 15 Aug 1947 Raghunath Singh (b. 1881 – d. 1951)
