= Kutlehar State =

Princely state of India

Coordinates: 31°36′42″N 76°6′44″E

Kutlehar State Kutlehar Estate
- Princely state until 1810. Estate during the British Raj
- the 750s–1957
- Flag
- Area
- 2,200 km^{2} (850 sq mi)
- History
  - Established: the 750s
  - Accession to the Indian Union: 1957
| Succeeded by |
| India |
- Today part of: Himachal Pradesh, India

Kutlehar State, covering an area of 2,200 km^{2} (850 sq mi), was one of the Princely states of India.

Kutlehar was an independent kingdom built in the 10th century. The limits of the kingdom were at their maximum during the rule of Raja Jas Pal in the 11th century when it is said that he was the master of all lands between the rivers of Satluj and Beas.

Numerous wars were fought over the centuries including in 1337 with Mohammad Bin Tughlak, Timur in 1398, Emperor Akbar in 1556 who levied a tribute upon the Raja of Kutlehar of 1600 rupees along with gifts of jewels, cloth and hill pheasants on the Emperor's birthday. Also as a guarantee of loyalty a son of the Raja, 'a Prince' of Royal Blood was kept in attendance at the Imperial Court in Delhi and a troop of 500 foot soldiers were stationed with the Mughal Emperor and paid for by the Kutlehar Durbar.

In 1700, Guru Gobind SIngh ji crossed Kutlehar when Anandpur Sahib was attacked by the Mughals. The then Raja defied the Mughal orders and did not attack the Sikh army paying heavily with the wrath of the Mughal Emperor and the Kutlehar territory was cut back and the Raja was left with just a fraction of his old territory. In 1701 the Raja and Rani of Kutlehar met Guru Gobind Singhji at Rewalsar where the Guruji presented the Raja with his sword as a token of gratitude. The Kutlehar Family is still in possession of the sword gifted by Guru Gobind Singh ji.

In the more recent past, the Kutlehar territory extended to the present areas if District Una, Talhatti in Hoshiarpur, Bassi Bachertoo in Bilaspur and in Hamirpur, till it was annexed by Maharaja Ranjit Singh in 1815 and the Raja exiled to the fort in Charatgarh. Punjab was then annexed by the British and the Raja ad allowed to move back in the hills.

== History ==
According to tradition Kutlehar state was founded around 750 AD by an ancestral king named Raja Gopal. Between 1805 and 1809 the state was occupied by Nepal until the Gorkha occupants were driven out. Kutlehar State was extinguished in 1825 when it was briefly annexed to Pañjab (Punjab). The same year, after the British established their domination in the area, the Raja of Kutlehar was granted a Jagir to the value of 10,000Rs. Raja Saheb Shri Ram Pal Bahadur (1864-1927) was granted the title of hereditary Raja on 15 March 1909.

== Rulers ==
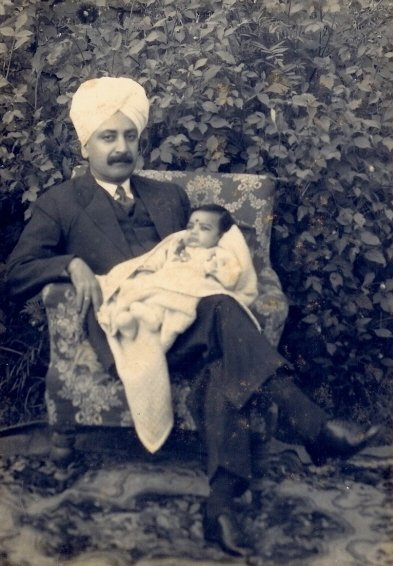
Brijmohan Pal

Rulers bore the title of Rai Saheb Sri.

Rajas

The known rulers of the kingdom are as follows:

| Name | Portrait | Ruled from | Ruled until | Notes |
|---|---|---|---|---|
| Gopal | | 750 | 770 | |
| Dharma Pal | | 770 | 810 | |
| Jas Pal | | 1100 | ? | |
| Chiru Pal | | 1150 | ? | |
| Chand Pal | | ? | 1210 | |
| Govind Pal | | 1210 | c. 1265 | |
| Yadu Pal | | c. 1700 | 1730 | |
| Dharam Pal | | c. 1730 | 1780 | |
| Gur Pal | | c. 1750 | 1798 | |
| Amrat Pal (1st time) (1785 – 1832) | | 1798 | 1803 | |
| Nepali occupation | | 1803 | 1815 | |
| Amrat Pal (2nd time) (1785 – 1832) | | 1815 | 1832 | |
| Narayan Pal (1821–1864) | | 1832 | 1864 | |
| Ram Pal (22 November 1849 – 22 November 1927) | | 15 January 1864 | 22 November 1927 | Raja Rampalji Bahadur. One of the Longest Reigning Monarchs in World History with a reign of 63 years, 311 days (23,321 Days). |
| Rajendra Pal (1874 – 14 February 1928) | | 22 November 1927 | 14 February 1928 | |
| Brij Mohan Pal (1890 – July 1937) | | 14 February 1928 | July 1937 | |
| Mahendra Pal (4 July 1937 – 20 July 2014) | | July 1937 | 20 July 2014 | |
| Budhishwar Pal | | 2014 | present | |

== See also ==
- Kutlehar Fort
- Kutlehar Assembly constituency
