= Religion in the Punjab =

Cultural aspect of the region of Punjab

Religion in the Punjab in ancient history was characterized by Hinduism and later conversions to Jainism, Buddhism, Islam, Sikhism and Christianity; it also includes folk practices common to all Punjabis regardless of the religion they adhere to. Such practices incorporate local mysticism, including ancestral worship and worship of local saints of all faiths.

Religion in the Punjab
(2011 and 2017) (Note: Estimates from combining 2011 Indian census and 2017 Pakistani census with religious data amalgamated from Punjab, India, Punjab, Pakistan, Haryana, Himachal Pradesh, Islamabad, and Chandigarh.)
1. Islam (64.7%)
2. Hinduism (23.4%)
3. Sikhism (10.1%)
4. Christianity (1.49%)
5. Others (0.32%)

== Background ==
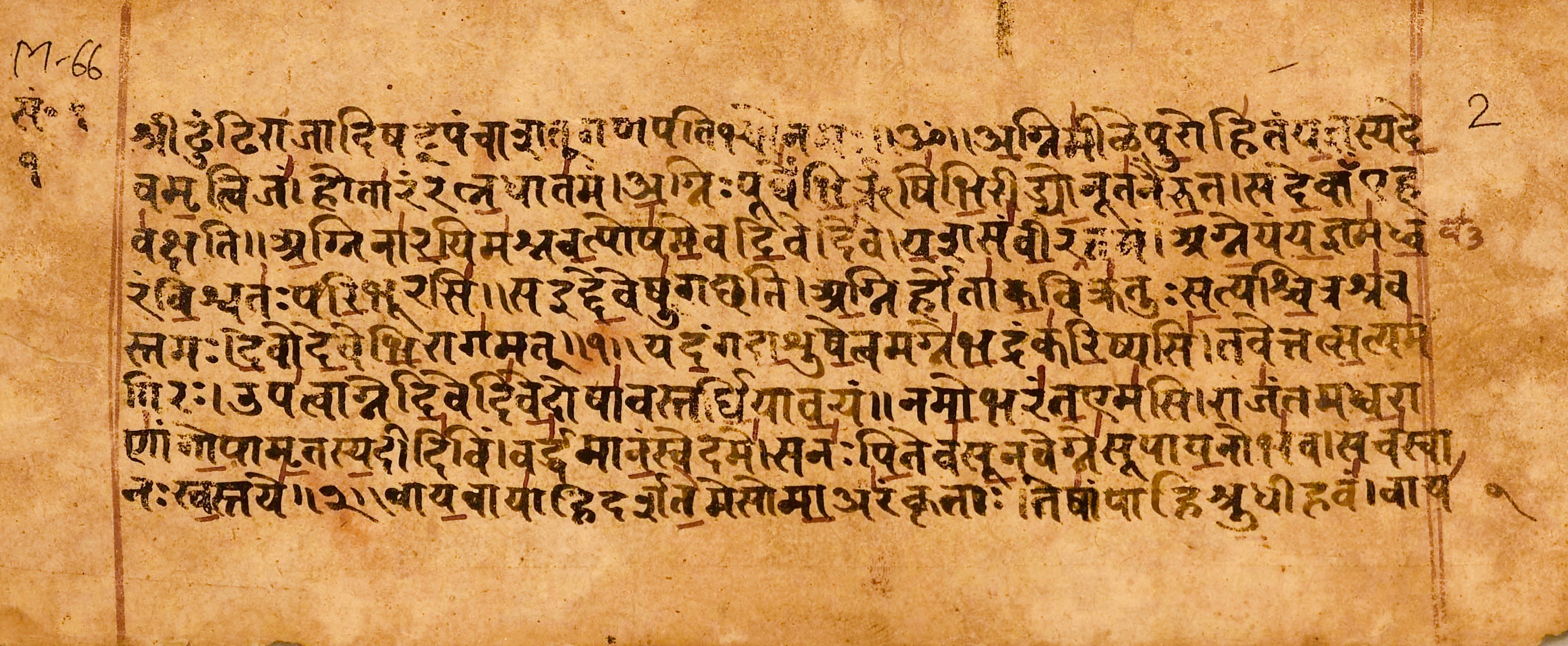
Rig Veda is the oldest Hindu text that originated in the Punjab region.

Hinduism is the oldest of the religions practised by Punjabi people; however, the term Hindu was applied over a vast territory, with much regional diversity. The historical Vedic religion constituted the religious ideas and practices in the Punjab during the Vedic period (1500–500 BCE), centered primarily in the worship of Indra. (Note: Michaels (2004, p. 38): "The legacy of the Vedic religion in Hinduism is generally overestimated. The influence of the mythology is indeed great, but the religious terminology changed considerably: all the key terms of Hinduism either do not exist in Vedic or have a completely different meaning. The religion of the Veda does not know the ethicised migration of the soul with retribution for acts (karma), the cyclical destruction of the world, or the idea of salvation during one's lifetime (jivanmukti; moksa; nirvana); the idea of the world as illusion (maya) must have gone against the grain of ancient India, and an omnipotent creator god emerges only in the late hymns of the rgveda. Nor did the Vedic religion know a caste system, the burning of widows, the ban on remarriage, images of gods and temples, Puja worship, Yoga, pilgrimages, vegetarianism, the holiness of cows, the doctrine of stages of life (asrama), or knew them only at their inception. Thus, it is justified to see a turning point between the Vedic religion and Hindu religions." Jamison, Stephanie; Witzel, Michael (1992). "Vedic Hinduism" (PDF). Harvard University. p. 3.: "... to call this period Vedic Hinduism is a contradictio in terminis since Vedic religion is very different from what we generally call Hindu religion – at least as much as Old Hebrew religion is from medieval and modern Christian religion. However, Vedic religion is treatable as a predecessor of Hinduism." See also Halbfass 1991, pp. 1–2) The bulk of the Rigveda was composed in the Punjab region between circa 1500 and 1200 BC, while later Vedic scriptures were composed more eastwards, between the Yamuna and Ganges rivers. An ancient Indian law book, called the Manusmriti, developed by Brahmin Hindu priests, shaped Punjabi religious life from 200 BC onward.

Later, the spread of Buddhisim and Jainism in the Indian subcontinent saw the growth of Buddhism and Jainism in the Punjab. Islam was introduced via southern Punjab in the 8th century, becoming the majority by the 16th century, via local conversion. There was a small Jain community left in Punjab by the 16th century, while the Buddhist community had largely disappeared by the turn of the 10th century. The region became predominantly Muslim due to missionary Sufi saints whose dargahs (shrines) dot the landscape of the Punjab region.

The rise of Sikhism in the 1700s saw some Punjabis, both Hindu and Muslim, accepting the new Sikh faith. A number of Punjabis during the colonial period of India became Christians, with all of these religions characterizing the religious diversity now found in the Punjab region.

== History ==
=== Ancient period ===
The Persians were the first to use the term Hindu, referring to a vast territory containing much regional variety in belief and practice. Nevertheless, the common concept was the belief in cycles of reincarnation, or sansār, and was the oldest recorded religion in the region. While law books like the Manusmriti codified socio-religious customs and were sanctified by the Hindu religion, such books more generally influenced the formation of broader traditional societal beliefs.

=== Medieval period ===
Sikhism appeared in the 16th century, in reaction to both Punjabi and subcontinent-wide cultural practices of the time, including asceticism, the caste system, and female subordination, as well as in congruence with it, sharing precepts with Hinduism, including karma, sansār, and liberation, and that with Islam, including a formless God, rejection of idolatry, and social equality. It also developed its own distinct doctrines, including the belief that both intrinsic factors (egocentrism, to be ameliorated through devotion and prayer), and external forces (social and political oppression, to be addressed by community service and armed self-defense as needed, and balancing spiritual and temporal power in the world as opposed to renunciation), produced suffering.

=== Modern period ===
During the colonial era, the practice of religious syncretism among Punjabi Muslims and Punjabi Hindus was noted and documented by officials in census reports:

"In other parts of the Province, too, traces of Hindu festivals are noticeable among the Muhammadans. In the western Punjab, Baisakhi, the new year's day of the Hindus, is celebrated as an agricultural festival, by all Muhammadans, by racing bullocks yoked to the well gear, with the beat of tom-toms, and large crowds gather to witness the show, The race is called Baisakhi and is a favourite pastime in the well-irrigated tracts. Then the processions of tazias, in Muharram, with the accompaniment of tom-toms, fencing parties and bands playing on flutes and other musical instruments (which is disapproved by the orthodox Muhammadans) and the establishment of Sabils (shelters where water and sharbat are served out) are clearly influenced by similar practices at Hindu festivals, while the illuminations on occasions like the Chiraghan fair of Shalamar (Lahore) are no doubt practices answering to the holiday-making instinct of the converted Hindus."
"Besides actual conversion, Islam has had a considerable influence on the Hindu religion. The sects of reformers based on a revolt from the orthodoxy of Varnashrama Dharma were obviously the outcome of the knowledge that a different religion could produce equally pious and right thinking men. Laxity in social restrictions also appeared simultaneously in various degrees and certain customs were assimilated to those of the Muhammadans. On the other hand the miraculous powers of Muhammadan saints were enough to attract the saint worshiping Hindus, to allegiance, if not to a total change of faith... The Shamsis are believers in Shah Shamas Tabrez of Multan, and follow the Imam, for the time being, of the Ismailia sect of Shias... they belong mostly to the Sunar caste and their connection with the sect is kept a secret, like Freemasonry. They pass as ordinary Hindus, but their devotion to the Imam is very strong."

— Excerpts from the Census of India (Punjab Province), 1911 AD

==== Population exchange ====
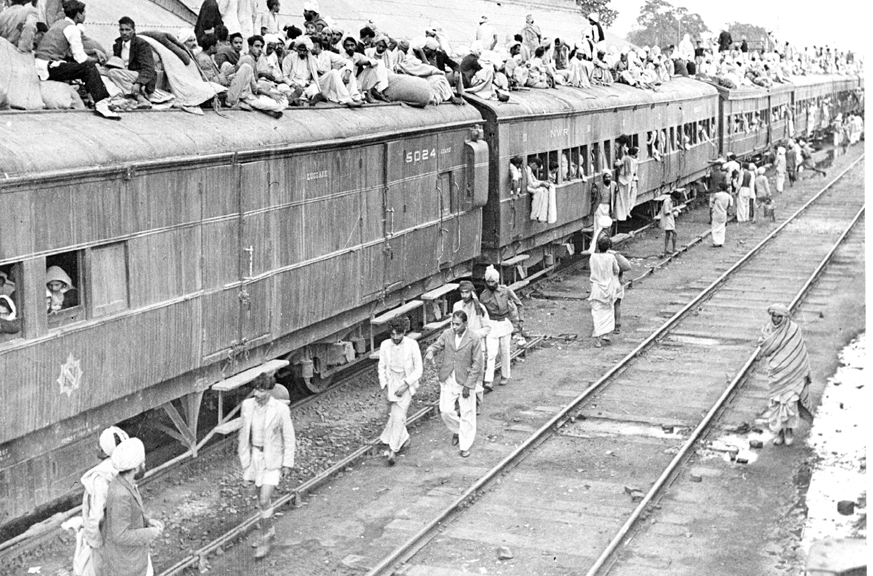
A refugee special train at Ambala Station during the Partition of India

During Partition, both Indian and Pakistani Punjab witnessed a large-scale population exchange of minorities. Almost all Hindus and Sikhs, who numbered 3.9 million at the time of the 1941 census, left Pakistani Punjab for Indian Punjab, while Muslims, who numbered 5.2 million at the time of the 1941 census, left Indian Punjab for Pakistani Punjab. This resulted in the near-total alienation of minorities on both sides.

The 1951 Census of India and Pakistan reported that Muslims comprised 1.77% of the population in East Punjab India, numbering 300,246, whereas Hindus comprised 0.16% of the population in West Punjab Pakistan, numbering 33,052, while only 35 others were recorded, some of whom may have been Sikh. Virtually no Muslims survived in East Punjab (except in Malerkotla, Nuh, Qadian, and Ambala district), and virtually no Hindus or Sikhs survived in West Punjab (except in Rahim Yar Khan, Bahawalpur, and Sialkot District).

== Punjab region ==
=== 1855 census ===
The 1855 census detailed the population of Punjab Province totaled 19,468,427 persons. At the time, religious affiliation enumeration was solely conducted in regions of the province under direct British administration (districts), with a total population numbering 12,717,821 persons, excluding the additional 6,750,606 persons residing in the princely states. At the time of enumeration, only two religious categories broadly existed, including one response for Dharmic faiths, referred to as Hindoo; the other category included one response for Abrahamic and other faiths, referred to as Mahomedan and others non Hindoo.

Adherents of Sikhism were only enumerated in the districts of the Lahore Division, which found that the Sikh population stood at 181,172 persons or 5.2 percent of the total population (3,458,694) of the division. The district breakdown within Lahore Division included 71,364 persons in Amritsar District (8.1 percent), 55,709 persons in Lahore District (9.4 percent), 24,746 persons in Gurdaspur District (3.1 percent), 19,775 persons in Sialkot District (3.1 percent), and 9,578 persons Gujranwala District (1.7 percent). Sikh populations existed interspersed throughout all regions across the province as a whole, including in other districts under direct British administration, alongside the princely states. Significant populations in the former region existed in the Chaj Doab, with the Cis-Sutlej states and Trans-Sutlej states also featuring significant populations in the latter region.

Religion in the districts of Punjab Province under direct British Administration (1855 census)
District	Abrahamic religions & Others (Islam, Christianity, Zoroastrianism, Judaism, others)		Dharmic religions (Hinduism, Sikhism, Jainism, Buddhism, others)		Total	
District	Pop.	%	Pop.	%	Pop.	%
Ambala District	219,570	28.08%	562,447	71.92%	782,017	100%
Thanesar District	125,121	25.19%	371,627	74.81%	496,748	100%
Ludhiana District	196,411	37.22%	331,311	62.78%	527,722	100%
Firozpur District	209,479	44.04%	266,145	55.96%	475,624	100%
Jalandhar District	318,229	44.9%	390,499	55.1%	708,728	100%
Hoshiarpur District	279,861	33.11%	565,493	66.89%	845,354	100%
Kangra District	50,709	7.05%	668,246	92.95%	718,955	100%
Lahore District	323,529	54.68%	268,154	45.32%	591,683	100%
Amritsar District	391,854	44.31%	492,575	55.69%	884,429	100%
Gurdaspur District	355,704	45.17%	431,713	54.83%	787,417	100%
Gujranwala District	366,975	66.31%	186,408	33.69%	553,383	100%
Sialkot District	350,982	54.69%	290,800	45.31%	641,782	100%
Rawalpindi District	480,488	86.77%	73,262	13.23%	553,750	100%
Jhelum District	365,945	85.22%	63,475	14.78%	429,420	100%
Gujrat District	420,229	81.18%	97,397	18.82%	517,626	100%
Shahpur District	216,361	82.68%	45,331	17.32%	261,692	100%
Multan District	328,786	79.92%	82,600	20.08%	411,386	100%
Jhang District	206,258	81.92%	45,511	18.08%	251,769	100%
Googaira District	234,611	76.17%	73,409	23.83%	308,020	100%
Layyah District	267,167	86.27%	42,529	13.73%	309,696	100%
Khangarh District	176,833	83.44%	35,087	16.56%	211,920	100%
Dera Ghazi Khan District	199,566	83.51%	39,398	16.49%	238,964	100%
Dera Ismail Khan District	323,071	89.24%	38,970	10.76%	362,041	100%
Peshawar District	403,534	89.65%	46,565	10.35%	450,099	100%
Hazara District	276,927	93.44%	19,437	6.56%	296,364	100%
Kohat District	95,602	94.44%	5,630	5.56%	101,232	100%
Total British Punjab Districts (Note: All districts in table above that ultimately formed part of Punjab Province, east of the Indus River, which excludes Dera Ismail Khan District, Peshawar District, Hazara District, and Kohat District.)	6,084,668	52.87%	5,423,417	47.13%	11,508,085	100%
Total British NWFP Districts (Note: Dera Ismail Khan District, Peshawar District, Hazara District, and Kohat District only.)	1,099,134	90.86%	110,602	9.14%	1,209,736	100%
Total British Punjab Territory (1855 borders)	7,183,802	56.49%	5,534,019	43.51%	12,717,821	100%
Note: At the time of the 1855 census, religious enumeration in Punjab Province did not occur in the princely states. Population enumeration did take place, revealing the total population in the princely states stood at 6,750,606 persons. Combined with the 12,717,821 persons in the territories under direct British administration, the total population of the province stood at 19,468,427 persons.

=== 1881 to 1941 censuses ===
Religious groups in Punjab Province (1881–1941)
Religious group	1881 (Note: Including Delhi district, which was later made into a separate province in 1912, following the transfer from Calcutta to Delhi as capital of India in 1911.) (Note: Population figure excludes subdivisions that would ultimately form part of North-West Frontier Province following bifurcation of Punjab Province in 1901.)		1891		1901		1911		1921		1931		1941	
Religious group	Pop.	%	Pop.	%	Pop.	%	Pop.	%	Pop.	%	Pop.	%	Pop.	%
Islam	9,872,745	47.58%	10,827,628	47.39%	12,183,345	49.22%	12,275,477	50.75%	12,813,383	51.05%	14,929,896	52.4%	18,259,744	53.22%
Hinduism (Note: 1931 & 1941 censuses: Including Ad-Dharmis)	9,095,175	43.84%	10,070,716	44.08%	10,344,469	41.79%	8,773,621	36.27%	8,799,651	35.06%	9,018,509	31.65%	10,336,549	30.13%
Sikhism	1,706,165	8.22%	1,849,371	8.09%	2,102,896	8.49%	2,883,729	11.92%	3,107,296	12.38%	4,071,624	14.29%	5,116,185	14.91%
Jainism	42,572	0.21%	45,575	0.2%	49,983	0.2%	46,775	0.19%	41,321	0.16%	43,140	0.15%	45,475	0.13%
Christianity	28,054	0.14%	48,472	0.21%	66,591	0.27%	199,751	0.83%	332,939	1.33%	419,353	1.47%	512,466	1.49%
Buddhism	3,251	0.02%	6,236	0.03%	6,940	0.03%	7,690	0.03%	5,912	0.02%	7,753	0.03%	854	0.002%
Zoroastrianism	413	0.002%	364	0.002%	477	0.002%	653	0.003%	526	0.002%	569	0.002%	4,359	0.01%
Judaism	—N/a	—N/a	29	0.0001%	24	0.0001%	54	0.0002%	19	0.0001%	13	0%	39	0.0001%
Others	57	0.0003%	28	0.0001%	12	0%	0	0%	13	0.0001%	0	0%	34,190	0.1%
Total population	20,748,432	100%	22,848,419	100%	24,754,737	100%	24,187,750	100%	25,101,060	100%	28,490,857	100%	34,309,861	100%
Territory comprises the contemporary subdivisions of Punjab, India, Chandigarh Union Territory, Haryana, Himachal Pradesh, National Capital Territory of Delhi (until 1911), Punjab, Pakistan, and Islamabad Capital Territory.

=== 1951 census ===
Religious groups in the Punjab Region (1951 Census of India & 1951 Census of Pakistan)
Religious group	Punjab Province Region		West Punjab Region (Pakistan)		East Punjab Region (India)	
Religious group	Population	Percentage	Pop.	%	Pop.	%
Islam	20,501,040	54.51%	20,200,794	97.89%	300,246	1.77%
Hinduism	11,002,672	29.25%	33,052	0.16%	10,969,620	64.62%
Sikhism	5,558,937	14.78%	—N/a	—N/a	5,558,937	32.75%
Christianity	501,792	1.33%	402,617	1.95%	99,175	0.58%
Jainism	45,130	0.12%	—N/a	—N/a	45,130	0.27%
Buddhism	1,671	0.004%	9	0%	1,662	0.01%
Zoroastrianism	370	0.001%	195	0%	175	0%
Judaism	159	0.0004%	—N/a	—N/a	159	0%
Others	685	0.002%	35	0%	650	0%
Total responses	37,612,456	99.25%	20,636,702 (Note: Excluding 14,438 persons claiming Nationalities other than Pakistani.)	99.93%	16,975,754 (Note: Excluding 268,602 persons from the Jalandhar Division as religious enumeration lost due to fire in the Jalandhar Census Tabulation Office.)	98.44%
Total population	37,895,496	100%	20,651,140	100%	17,244,356	100%
Territory comprises the contemporary subdivisions of Punjab, India, Chandigarh Union Territory, Haryana, Himachal Pradesh, Punjab, Pakistan, and Islamabad Capital Territory.

=== 2011 & 2017 censuses ===
Religious groups in the Punjab Region (2011 Census of India & 2017 Census of Pakistan)
Religious group	Punjab Province Region		West Punjab Region (Pakistan)		East Punjab Region (India)	
Religious group	Total Population	Percentage	Pop.	%	Pop.	%
Islam	111,971,638	64.72%	109,453,479	97.73%	2,518,159	4.13%
Hinduism	40,446,983	23.38%	212,378	0.19%	40,234,605	65.94%
Sikhism	17,466,731	10.1%	—N/a	—N/a	17,466,731	28.63%
Christianity	2,569,859	1.49%	2,149,910	1.92%	419,949	0.69%
Ahmadiyya	160,759	0.09%	160,759	0.14%	—N/a	—N/a
Buddhism	120,570	0.07%	—N/a	—N/a	120,570	0.2%
Jainism	101,418	0.06%	—N/a	—N/a	101,418	0.17%
Others	169,917	0.1%	16,497	0.01%	153,420	0.25%
Total population	173,007,875	100%	111,993,023	100%	61,014,852	100%
Territory comprises the contemporary subdivisions of Punjab, India, Chandigarh Union Territory, Haryana, Himachal Pradesh, Punjab, Pakistan, and Islamabad Capital Territory.

== West Punjab ==
Religion in West Punjab (1881–1947)
Religious group	1881 (Note: 1881 figure taken from census data by combining the total population of all districts (Lahore, Sialkot, Gujranwala, Gujrat, Shahpur, Jhelum, Rawalpindi, Montgomery, Jhang, Multan, Muzaffargargh, Dera Ghazi Khan), one tehsil (Shakargarh – then part of Gurdaspur District), and one princely state (Bahawalpur) in Punjab Province, British India that ultimately fell on the western side of the Radcliffe Line. See 1881 census data here: Immediately following the partition of India in 1947, these districts and tract would ultimately make up the subdivision of West Punjab, which also later included Bahawalpur. The state that makes up this region in the contemporary era is Punjab, Pakistan.)		1891 (Note: 1891 figure taken from census data by combining the total population of all districts (Lahore, Sialkot, Gujranwala, Gujrat, Shahpur, Jhelum, Rawalpindi, Montgomery, Jhang, Multan, Muzaffargargh, Dera Ghazi Khan), one tehsil (Shakargarh – then part of Gurdaspur District), one princely state (Bahawalpur), and one tract (Biloch Trans–Frontier) in Punjab Province, British India that ultimately fell on the western side of the Radcliffe Line. See 1891 census data here: Immediately following the partition of India in 1947, these districts and tract would ultimately make up the subdivision of West Punjab, which also later included Bahawalpur. The state that makes up this region in the contemporary era is Punjab, Pakistan.)		1901 (Note: 1901 figure taken from census data by combining the total population of all districts (Lahore, Sialkot, Gujranwala, Gujrat, Shahpur, Jhelum, Rawalpindi, Mianwali, Montgomery, Lyallpur (inscribed as the Chenab Colony on the 1901 census), Jhang, Multan, Muzaffargargh, Dera Ghazi Khan), one tehsil (Shakargarh – then part of Gurdaspur District), one princely state (Bahawalpur), and one tract (Biloch Trans–Frontier) in Punjab Province, British India that ultimately fell on the western side of the Radcliffe Line. See 1901 census data here: Immediately following the partition of India in 1947, these districts and tract would ultimately make up the subdivision of West Punjab, which also later included Bahawalpur. The state that makes up this region in the contemporary era is Punjab, Pakistan.)		1911 (Note: 1911 figure taken from census data by combining the total population of all districts (Lahore, Sialkot, Gujranwala, Gujrat, Shahpur, Jhelum, Rawalpindi, Attock, Mianwali, Montgomery, Lyallpur, Jhang, Multan, Muzaffargargh, Dera Ghazi Khan), one tehsil (Shakargarh – then part of Gurdaspur District), one princely state (Bahawalpur), and one tract (Biloch Trans–Frontier) in Punjab Province, British India that ultimately fell on the western side of the Radcliffe Line. See 1911 census data here: Immediately following the partition of India in 1947, these districts and tract would ultimately make up the subdivision of West Punjab, which also later included Bahawalpur. The state that makes up this region in the contemporary era is Punjab, Pakistan.)		1921 (Note: 1921 figure taken from census data by combining the total population of all districts (Lahore, Sialkot, Gujranwala, Sheikhupura, Gujrat, Shahpur, Jhelum, Rawalpindi, Attock, Mianwali, Montgomery, Lyallpur, Jhang, Multan, Muzaffargargh, Dera Ghazi Khan), one tehsil (Shakargarh – then part of Gurdaspur District), one princely state (Bahawalpur), and one tract (Biloch Trans–Frontier) in Punjab Province, British India that ultimately fell on the western side of the Radcliffe Line. See 1921 census data here: Immediately following the partition of India in 1947, these districts and tract would ultimately make up the subdivision of West Punjab, which also later included Bahawalpur. The state that makes up this region in the contemporary era is Punjab, Pakistan.)		1931 (Note: 1931 figure taken from census data by combining the total population of all districts (Lahore, Sialkot, Gujranwala, Sheikhupura, Gujrat, Shahpur, Jhelum, Rawalpindi, Attock, Mianwali, Montgomery, Lyallpur, Jhang, Multan, Muzaffargargh, Dera Ghazi Khan), one tehsil (Shakargarh – then part of Gurdaspur District), one princely state (Bahawalpur), and one tract (Biloch Trans–Frontier) in Punjab Province, British India that ultimately fell on the western side of the Radcliffe Line. See 1931 census data here: Immediately following the partition of India in 1947, these districts and tract would ultimately make up the subdivision of West Punjab, which also later included Bahawalpur. The state that makes up this region in the contemporary era is Punjab, Pakistan.)		1941 (Note: 1941 figure taken from census data by combining the total population of all districts (Lahore, Sialkot, Gujranwala, Sheikhupura, Gujrat, Shahpur, Jhelum, Rawalpindi, Attock, Mianwali, Montgomery, Lyallpur, Jhang, Multan, Muzaffargargh, Dera Ghazi Khan), one tehsil (Shakargarh – then part of Gurdaspur District), one princely state (Bahawalpur), and one tract (Biloch Trans–Frontier) in Punjab Province, British India that ultimately fell on the western side of the Radcliffe Line. See 1941 census data here: Immediately following the partition of India in 1947, these districts and tract would ultimately make up the subdivision of West Punjab, which also later included Bahawalpur. The state that makes up this region in the contemporary era is Punjab, Pakistan.)		1947 estimates (Note: 1947 figures (the year of partition and the accompanying mass population transfer) for West Punjab are estimates based on the annualized growth rates between the 1931 census and 1941 census for adherents of Islam (+2.11% p.a.), Hinduism (+1.94% p.a.), Sikhism (+2.63% p.a.), Christianity (+1.99% p.a.), Jainism (+3.24% p.a.), and others (+45.77% p.a.).)	
Religious group	Pop.	%	Pop.	%	Pop.	%	Pop.	%	Pop.	%	Pop.	%	Pop.	%	Pop.	%
Islam	6,201,859	78.09%	6,766,545	76.07%	7,951,155	76.25%	8,494,314	76.49%	8,975,288	75.49%	10,570,029	75.28%	13,022,160	75.06%	14,760,215	74.34%
Hinduism	1,449,913	18.26%	1,727,810	19.42%	1,944,363	18.65%	1,645,758	14.82%	1,797,141	15.12%	1,957,878	13.94%	2,373,466	13.68%	2,663,488	13.41%
Sikhism	272,908	3.44%	366,162	4.12%	483,999	4.64%	813,441	7.33%	863,091	7.26%	1,180,789	8.41%	1,530,112	8.82%	1,788,007	9.01%
Christianity	12,992	0.16%	30,168	0.34%	42,371	0.41%	144,514	1.3%	247,030	2.08%	324,730	2.31%	395,311	2.28%	444,923	2.24%
Jainism	4,352	0.05%	4,408	0.05%	5,562	0.05%	5,977	0.05%	5,930	0.05%	6,921	0.05%	9,520	0.05%	11,527	0.06%
Zoroastrianism	354	0.004%	215	0.002%	300	0.003%	377	0.003%	309	0.003%	413	0.003%	312	0.002%	—N/a	—N/a
Buddhism	0	0%	0	0%	6	0.0001%	168	0.002%	172	0.001%	32	0.0002%	87	0.001%	—N/a	—N/a
Judaism	—N/a	—N/a	17	0.0002%	9	0.0001%	36	0.0003%	16	0.0001%	6	0%	7	0%	—N/a	—N/a
Others	21	0.0003%	17	0.0002%	0	0%	0	0%	8	0.0001%	0	0%	19,128	0.11%	187,413 (Note: Including Buddhism, Zoroastrianism, Judaism, Tribals, others, or not stated)	0.94%
Total Population	7,942,399	100%	8,895,342	100%	10,427,765	100%	11,104,585	100%	11,888,985	100%	14,040,798	100%	17,350,103	100%	19,855,573	100%
Territory comprises the contemporary subdivisions of Punjab, Pakistan and Islamabad Capital Territory. 1881 to 1941 figures are official census data. 1947 figures (the year of partition and the accompanying mass population transfer) for West Punjab are estimates based on the annualized growth rates between the 1931 census and 1941 census for adherents of Islam (+2.11% p.a.), Hinduism (+1.94% p.a.), Sikhism (+2.63% p.a.), Christianity (+1.99% p.a.), Jainism (+3.24% p.a.), and others (+45.77% p.a.). Note: 186 villages and 2 towns — Khemkaran and Patti — in Kasur Tehsil (Lahore District) fell on the eastern punjab (Indian) side of the Radcliffe Line, but their population numbers are still included here as detailed sub-tehsil religious data did not exist at the time. According to the 1941 census, Kasur Tehsil had a total of 322 villages and 3 towns, roughly half fell on the western punjab (Pakistani) side of the Radcliffe Line.

Annual Muslim Population Growth Rate in West Punjab
Year	Pop.	±% p.a.
1881	6,201,859	—
1891	6,766,545	+0.88%
1901	7,951,155	+1.63%
1911	8,494,314	+0.66%
1921	8,975,288	+0.55%
1931	10,570,029	+1.65%
1941	13,022,160	+2.11%

Annual Hindu Population Growth Rate in West Punjab
Year	Pop.	±% p.a.
1881	1,449,913	—
1891	1,727,810	+1.77%
1901	1,944,363	+1.19%
1911	1,645,758	−1.65%
1921	1,797,141	+0.88%
1931	1,957,878	+0.86%
1941	2,373,466	+1.94%

Annual Sikh Population Growth Rate in West Punjab
Year	Pop.	±% p.a.
1881	272,908	—
1891	366,162	+2.98%
1901	483,999	+2.83%
1911	813,441	+5.33%
1921	863,091	+0.59%
1931	1,180,789	+3.18%
1941	1,530,112	+2.63%

Annual Christian Population Growth Rate in West Punjab
Year	Pop.	±% p.a.
1881	12,992	—
1891	30,168	+8.79%
1901	42,371	+3.46%
1911	144,514	+13.05%
1921	247,030	+5.51%
1931	324,730	+2.77%
1941	395,311	+1.99%

Annual Jain Population Growth Rate in West Punjab
Year	Pop.	±% p.a.
1881	4,352	—
1891	4,408	+0.13%
1901	5,562	+2.35%
1911	5,977	+0.72%
1921	5,930	−0.08%
1931	6,921	+1.56%
1941	9,520	+3.24%

Annual Other Population Growth Rate in West Punjab
Year	Pop.	±% p.a.
1881	375	—
1891	249	−4.01%
1901	315	+2.38%
1911	581	+6.31%
1921	505	−1.39%
1931	451	−1.12%
1941	19,534	+45.77%

== East Punjab ==
Religion in East Punjab (1881–1947)
Religious group	1881 (Note: 1881 figure taken from census data by combining the total population of all districts (Hisar, Rohtak, Gurgaon, Delhi, Karnal, Sirsa, Jalandhar, Ludhiana, Firozpur, Amritsar, Simla, Kangra, Ambala, Hoshiarpur, and Gurdaspur (minus Shakargarh Tehsil)), and princely states (Loharu, Dujana, Pataudi, Kalsia, Kapurthala, Malerkotla, Faridkot, Patiala, Jind, Nabha, and Simla Hill) in Punjab Province, British India that ultimately fell on the eastern side of the Radcliffe Line. See 1881 census data here: Immediately following the partition of India in 1947, these districts and princely states would ultimately make up the subdivision of East Punjab, which also included Patiala and East Punjab States Union, Chief Commissioner's Province of Himachal Pradesh, and Bilaspur State. The states that make up this region in the contemporary era are Punjab, India, Chandigarh, Haryana, and Himachal Pradesh.)		1891 (Note: 1891 figure taken from census data by combining the total population of all districts (Hisar, Rohtak, Gurgaon, Delhi, Karnal, Jalandhar, Ludhiana, Firozpur, Amritsar, Simla, Kangra, Ambala, Hoshiarpur, and Gurdaspur (minus Shakargarh Tehsil)), and princely states (Loharu, Dujana, Pataudi, Kalsia, Kapurthala, Malerkotla, Faridkot, Patiala, Jind, Nabha, Nahan, Simla Hill, Mandi, and Chamba) in Punjab Province, British India that ultimately fell on the eastern side of the Radcliffe Line. See 1891 census data here: Immediately following the partition of India in 1947, these districts and princely states would ultimately make up the subdivision of East Punjab, which also included Patiala and East Punjab States Union, Chief Commissioner's Province of Himachal Pradesh, and Bilaspur State. The states that make up this region in the contemporary era are Punjab, India, Chandigarh, Haryana, and Himachal Pradesh.)		1901 (Note: 1901 figure taken from census data by combining the total population of all districts (Hisar, Rohtak, Gurgaon, Delhi, Karnal, Jalandhar, Ludhiana, Firozpur, Amritsar, Simla, Kangra, Ambala, Hoshiarpur, and Gurdaspur (minus Shakargarh Tehsil)), and princely states (Loharu, Dujana, Pataudi, Kalsia, Kapurthala, Malerkotla, Faridkot, Patiala, Jind, Nabha, Nahan, Simla Hill, Mandi, Suket, and Chamba) in Punjab Province, British India that ultimately fell on the eastern side of the Radcliffe Line. See 1901 census data here: Immediately following the partition of India in 1947, these districts and princely states would ultimately make up the subdivision of East Punjab, which also included Patiala and East Punjab States Union, Chief Commissioner's Province of Himachal Pradesh, and Bilaspur State. The states that make up this region in the contemporary era are Punjab, India, Chandigarh, Haryana, and Himachal Pradesh.)		1911 (Note: 1911 figure taken from census data by combining the total population of all districts (Hisar, Rohtak, Gurgaon, Delhi, Karnal, Jalandhar, Ludhiana, Firozpur, Amritsar, Simla, Kangra, Ambala, Hoshiarpur, and Gurdaspur (minus Shakargarh Tehsil)), and princely states (Loharu, Dujana, Pataudi, Kalsia, Kapurthala, Malerkotla, Faridkot, Patiala, Jind, Nabha, Nahan, Simla Hill, Mandi, Suket, and Chamba) in Punjab Province, British India that ultimately fell on the eastern side of the Radcliffe Line. See 1911 census data here: Immediately following the partition of India in 1947, these districts and princely states would ultimately make up the subdivision of East Punjab, which also included Patiala and East Punjab States Union, Chief Commissioner's Province of Himachal Pradesh, and Bilaspur State. The states that make up this region in the contemporary era are Punjab, India, Chandigarh, Haryana, and Himachal Pradesh.)		1921 (Note: 1921 figure taken from census data by combining the total population of all districts (Hisar, Rohtak, Gurgaon, Karnal, Jalandhar, Ludhiana, Firozpur, Amritsar, Simla, Kangra, Ambala, Hoshiarpur, and Gurdaspur (minus Shakargarh Tehsil)), and princely states (Loharu, Dujana, Pataudi, Kalsia, Kapurthala, Malerkotla, Faridkot, Patiala, Jind, Nabha, Nahan, Simla Hill, Bilaspur, Mandi, Suket, and Chamba) in Punjab Province, British India that ultimately fell on the eastern side of the Radcliffe Line. See 1921 census data here: Immediately following the partition of India in 1947, these districts and princely states would ultimately make up the subdivision of East Punjab, which also included Patiala and East Punjab States Union, Chief Commissioner's Province of Himachal Pradesh, and Bilaspur State. The states that make up this region in the contemporary era are Punjab, India, Chandigarh, Haryana, and Himachal Pradesh.)		1931 (Note: 1931 figure taken from census data by combining the total population of all districts (Hisar, Rohtak, Gurgaon, Karnal, Jalandhar, Ludhiana, Firozpur, Amritsar, Simla, Kangra, Ambala, Hoshiarpur, and Gurdaspur (minus Shakargarh Tehsil)), and princely states (Loharu, Dujana, Pataudi, Kalsia, Kapurthala, Malerkotla, Faridkot, Patiala, Jind, Nabha, Sirmoor, Simla Hill, Bilaspur, Mandi, Suket, and Chamba) in Punjab Province, British India that ultimately fell on the eastern side of the Radcliffe Line. See 1931 census data here: Immediately following the partition of India in 1947, these districts and princely states would ultimately make up the subdivision of East Punjab, which also included Patiala and East Punjab States Union, Chief Commissioner's Province of Himachal Pradesh, and Bilaspur State. The states that make up this region in the contemporary era are Punjab, India, Chandigarh, Haryana, and Himachal Pradesh.)		1941 (Note: 1941 figure taken from census data by combining the total population of all districts (Hisar, Rohtak, Gurgaon, Karnal, Jalandhar, Ludhiana, Firozpur, Amritsar, Simla, Kangra, Ambala, Hoshiarpur, and Gurdaspur (minus Shakargarh Tehsil)), and princely states (Loharu, Dujana, Pataudi, Kalsia, Kapurthala, Malerkotla, Faridkot, Patiala, Jind, Nabha, Sirmoor, Simla Hill, Bilaspur, Mandi, Suket, and Chamba) in Punjab Province, British India that ultimately fell on the eastern side of the Radcliffe Line. See 1941 census data here: Immediately following the partition of India in 1947, these districts and princely states would ultimately make up the subdivision of East Punjab, which also included Patiala and East Punjab States Union, Chief Commissioner's Province of Himachal Pradesh, and Bilaspur State. The states that make up this region in the contemporary era are Punjab, India, Chandigarh, Haryana, and Himachal Pradesh.)		1947 estimates (Note: 1947 figures (the year of partition and the accompanying mass population transfer) for East Punjab are estimates based on the annualized growth rates between the 1931 census and 1941 census for adherents of Hinduism (+1.21% p.a.), Islam (+1.85% p.a.), Sikhism (+2.18% p.a.), Christianity (+2.16% p.a.), Jainism (-0.07% p.a.), and others (+9.71% p.a.).)	
Religious group	Pop.	%	Pop.	%	Pop.	%	Pop.	%	Pop.	%	Pop.	%	Pop.	%	Pop.	%
Hinduism	7,645,262	59.7%	8,342,906	59.79%	8,400,106	58.63%	7,127,863	54.48%	7,002,510	53%	7,060,631	48.86%	7,963,083	46.95%	8,558,976	45.79%
Islam	3,670,886	28.67%	4,061,083	29.11%	4,232,190	29.54%	3,781,163	28.9%	3,838,095	29.05%	4,359,867	30.17%	5,237,584	30.88%	5,846,517	31.28%
Sikhism	1,433,257	11.19%	1,483,209	10.63%	1,618,897	11.3%	2,070,288	15.82%	2,244,205	16.99%	2,890,835	20.01%	3,586,073	21.14%	4,081,450	21.84%
Jainism	38,220	0.3%	41,167	0.3%	44,421	0.31%	40,798	0.31%	35,391	0.27%	36,219	0.25%	35,955	0.21%	35,804	0.19%
Christianity	15,062	0.12%	18,304	0.13%	24,220	0.17%	55,237	0.42%	85,909	0.65%	94,623	0.65%	117,155	0.69%	133,182	0.71%
Buddhism	3,251	0.03%	6,236	0.04%	6,934	0.05%	7,522	0.06%	5,740	0.04%	7,721	0.05%	767	0.005%	—N/a	—N/a
Zoroastrianism	59	0.0005%	149	0.001%	177	0.001%	276	0.002%	217	0.002%	156	0.001%	4,047	0.02%	—N/a	—N/a
Judaism	—N/a	—N/a	12	0.0001%	15	0.0001%	18	0.0001%	3	0%	7	0%	32	0.0002%	—N/a	—N/a
Others	36	0.0003%	11	0.0001%	12	0.0001%	0	0%	5	0%	0	0%	15,062	0.09%	34,714	0.19%
Total Population	12,806,033	100%	13,953,077	100%	14,326,972	100%	13,083,165	100%	13,212,075	100%	14,450,059	100%	16,959,758	100%	18,690,643	100%
Territory comprises the contemporary subdivisions of Punjab, India, Chandigarh, Haryana, Delhi (until 1911), and Himachal Pradesh. 1881 to 1941 figures are official census data. 1947 figures (the year of partition and the accompanying mass population transfer) for East Punjab are estimates based on the annualized growth rates between the 1931 census and 1941 census for adherents of Hinduism (+1.21% p.a.), Islam (+1.85% p.a.), Sikhism (+2.18% p.a.), Christianity (+2.16% p.a.), Jainism (-0.07% p.a.), and others (+9.71% p.a.). Note: 186 villages and 2 towns — Khemkaran and Patti — in Kasur Tehsil (Lahore District) fell on the eastern (Indian) side of the Radcliffe Line, but their population numbers are not included here as detailed sub-tehsil religious data did not exist at the time. According to the 1941 census, Kasur Tehsil had a total of 322 villages and 3 towns, roughly half fell on the western (Pakistani) side of the Radcliffe Line.

Annual Hindu Population Growth Rate in East Punjab
Year	Pop.	±% p.a.
1881	7,645,262	—
1891	8,342,906	+0.88%
1901	8,400,106	+0.07%
1911	7,127,863	−1.63%
1921	7,002,510	−0.18%
1931	7,060,631	+0.08%
1941	7,963,083	+1.21%

Annual Muslim Population Growth Rate in East Punjab
Year	Pop.	±% p.a.
1881	3,670,886	—
1891	4,061,083	+1.02%
1901	4,232,190	+0.41%
1911	3,781,163	−1.12%
1921	3,838,095	+0.15%
1931	4,359,867	+1.28%
1941	5,237,584	+1.85%

Annual Sikh Population Growth Rate in East Punjab
Year	Pop.	±% p.a.
1881	1,433,257	—
1891	1,483,209	+0.34%
1901	1,618,897	+0.88%
1911	2,070,288	+2.49%
1921	2,244,205	+0.81%
1931	2,890,835	+2.56%
1941	3,586,073	+2.18%

Annual Jain Population Growth Rate in East Punjab
Year	Pop.	±% p.a.
1881	38,220	—
1891	41,167	+0.75%
1901	44,421	+0.76%
1911	40,798	−0.85%
1921	35,391	−1.41%
1931	36,219	+0.23%
1941	35,955	−0.07%

Annual Christian Population Growth Rate in East Punjab
Year	Pop.	±% p.a.
1881	15,062	—
1891	18,304	+1.97%
1901	24,220	+2.84%
1911	55,237	+8.59%
1921	85,909	+4.52%
1931	94,623	+0.97%
1941	117,155	+2.16%

Annual Other Population Growth Rate in East Punjab
Year	Pop.	±% p.a.
1881	3,346	—
1891	6,408	+6.71%
1901	7,138	+1.08%
1911	7,816	+0.91%
1921	5,965	−2.67%
1931	7,884	+2.83%
1941	19,908	+9.71%

== Subregions ==
Following the creation of the North-West Frontier Province in 1901, the Punjab region (Punjab Province) was divided into four natural geographical divisions by colonial officials on the decadal census data:

1. Indo−Gangetic Plain West geographical division (including Hisar district, Loharu State, Rohtak district, Dujana State, Gurgaon district, Pataudi State, Delhi, Karnal district, Jalandhar district, Kapurthala State, Ludhiana district, Malerkotla State, Firozpur district, Faridkot State, Patiala State, Jind State, Nabha State, Lahore District, Amritsar district, Gujranwala District, and Sheikhupura District);
2. Himalayan geographical division (including Sirmoor State, Simla District, Simla Hill States, Bilaspur State, Kangra district, Mandi State, Suket State, and Chamba State);
3. Sub−Himalayan geographical division (including Ambala district, Kalsia State, Hoshiarpur district, Gurdaspur district, Sialkot District, Gujrat District, Jhelum District, Rawalpindi District, and Attock District);
4. North−West Dry Area geographical division (including Montgomery District, Shahpur District, Mianwali District, Lyallpur District, Jhang District, Multan District, Bahawalpur State, Muzaffargarh District, Dera Ghazi Khan District, and the Biloch Trans–Frontier Tract).

Throughout history, religious diversity has been noted across the Punjab region. During the colonial era, the various districts and princely states that made up each of the four geographical divisions were religiously eclectic, each containing significant populations of Punjabi Muslims, Punjabi Hindus, Punjabi Sikhs, Punjabi Christians, along with other ethnic and religious minorities.

However, between the censuses of 1941 and 1951, a sudden shift towards religious homogeneity occurred in all districts across Punjab owing to the new international border that cut through the province due to the partition of India in 1947. This rapid demographic shift was primarily as a consequence of wide scale migration but also caused by large-scale religious cleansing riots which were witnessed across the region at the time. According to historical demographer Tim Dyson, in the eastern regions of Punjab that ultimately became Indian Punjab following independence, districts that were 66% Hindu in 1941 became 80% Hindu in 1951; those that were 20% Sikh became 50% Sikh in 1951. Conversely, in the western regions of Punjab that ultimately became Pakistani Punjab, all districts became almost exclusively Muslim by 1951.

=== Indo−Gangetic Plain West geographical division ===
Including Hisar district, Loharu State, Rohtak district, Dujana State, Gurgaon district, Pataudi State, Delhi (until 1911), Karnal district, Jalandhar district, Kapurthala State, Ludhiana district, Malerkotla State, Firozpur district, Faridkot State, Patiala State, Jind State, Nabha State, Lahore District, Amritsar district, Gujranwala District, and Sheikhupura District.

Religious groups in the Indo—Gangetic Plain West geographical division of Punjab Province (1881–1951)
Religious group	1881		1901		1911		1921		1931		1941		1951	
Religious group	Pop.	%	Pop.	%	Pop.	%	Pop.	%	Pop.	%	Pop.	%	Pop.	%
Hinduism	4,975,901	48.94%	5,825,964	48.64%	4,790,624	43.44%	4,735,960	41.37%	4,709,545	36.59%	5,314,610	34.43%	6,995,047	44.22%
Islam	3,751,891	36.9%	4,481,366	37.42%	4,144,971	37.59%	4,350,186	38%	5,112,215	39.72%	6,247,791	40.48%	3,900,275	24.65%
Sikhism	1,390,873	13.68%	1,605,457	13.4%	1,993,750	18.08%	2,186,429	19.1%	2,816,785	21.88%	3,576,659	23.17%	4,644,037	29.36%
Jainism	36,479	0.36%	41,877	0.35%	39,111	0.35%	33,515	0.29%	34,806	0.27%	34,744	0.23%	38,283	0.24%
Christianity	11,729	0.12%	22,103	0.18%	58,462	0.53%	140,104	1.22%	198,081	1.54%	247,028	1.6%	241,084	1.52%
Zoroastrianism	139	0%	299	0%	412	0%	318	0%	314	0%	235	0%	333	0%
Buddhism	1	0%	3	0%	132	0%	184	0%	23	0%	39	0%	332	0%
Judaism	—N/a	—N/a	19	0%	28	0%	14	0%	5	0%	30	0%	131	0%
Others	49	0%	12	0%	0	0%	6	0%	0	0%	14,844	0.1%	671	0%
Total population (Note: See total breakdowns in tables below.)	10,167,062	100%	11,977,100	100%	11,027,490	100%	11,446,716	100%	12,871,774	100%	15,435,980	100%	15,820,193	100%

==== 1901 census ====
Religion in the Districts & Princely States of the Indo−Gangetic Plain West geographical division (1901)
District/ Princely State	Hinduism		Islam		Sikhism		Jainism		Christianity		Others		Total	
District/ Princely State	Pop.	%	Pop.	%	Pop.	%	Pop.	%	Pop.	%	Pop.	%	Pop.	%
Hisar District	544,799	69.69%	202,009	25.84%	28,642	3.66%	6,003	0.77%	253	0.03%	11	0%	781,717	100%
Loharu State	13,254	87.03%	1,963	12.89%	0	0%	12	0.08%	0	0%	0	0%	15,229	100%
Rohtak District	533,723	84.63%	91,687	14.54%	94	0.01%	5,087	0.81%	80	0.01%	1	0%	630,672	100%
Dujana State	18,380	76.03%	5,790	23.95%	4	0.02%	0	0%	0	0%	0	0%	24,174	100%
Gurgaon District	499,373	66.92%	242,548	32.5%	99	0.01%	3,909	0.52%	278	0.04%	1	0%	746,208	100%
Pataudi State	18,281	83.35%	3,549	16.18%	0	0%	103	0.47%	0	0%	0	0%	21,933	100%
Delhi District	510,532	74.09%	167,290	24.28%	294	0.04%	7,726	1.12%	3,158	0.46%	39	0.01%	689,039	100%
Karnal District	623,597	70.6%	241,412	27.33%	12,294	1.39%	4,739	0.54%	1,179	0.13%	4	0%	883,225	100%
Jalandhar District	368,051	40.11%	421,011	45.88%	125,817	13.71%	969	0.11%	1,713	0.19%	26	0%	917,587	100%
Kapurthala State	93,652	29.79%	178,326	56.73%	42,101	13.39%	226	0.07%	39	0.01%	7	0%	314,351	100%
Ludhiana District	269,076	39.98%	235,937	35.05%	164,919	24.5%	2,217	0.33%	947	0.14%	1	0%	673,097	100%
Malerkotla State	38,409	49.56%	27,229	35.13%	10,495	13.54%	1,361	1.76%	12	0.02%	0	0%	77,506	100%
Firozpur District	279,099	29.13%	447,615	46.72%	228,355	23.83%	1,090	0.11%	1,908	0.2%	5	0%	958,072	100%
Faridkot State	35,778	28.64%	35,996	28.82%	52,721	42.21%	406	0.33%	11	0.01%	0	0%	124,912	100%
Patiala State	880,490	55.14%	357,334	22.38%	355,649	22.27%	2,877	0.18%	316	0.02%	26	0%	1,596,692	100%
Jind State	211,963	75.16%	38,717	13.73%	29,975	10.63%	1,258	0.45%	80	0.03%	10	0%	282,003	100%
Nabha State	160,553	53.89%	58,550	19.65%	78,361	26.3%	476	0.16%	7	0%	2	0%	297,949	100%
Lahore District	276,375	23.78%	717,519	61.74%	159,701	13.74%	1,047	0.09%	7,296	0.63%	171	0.01%	1,162,109	100%
Amritsar District	280,985	27.44%	474,976	46.39%	264,329	25.82%	1,439	0.14%	2,078	0.2%	21	0%	1,023,828	100%
Gujranwala District	169,594	22.41%	531,908	70.28%	51,607	6.82%	932	0.12%	2,748	0.36%	8	0%	756,797	100%
Total	5,825,964	48.64%	4,481,366	37.42%	1,605,457	13.4%	41,877	0.35%	22,103	0.18%	333	0.003%	11,977,100	100%

==== 1911 census ====
Religion in the Districts & Princely States of the Indo−Gangetic Plain West geographical division (1911)
District/ Princely State	Hinduism		Islam		Sikhism		Christianity		Jainism		Others		Total	
District/ Princely State	Pop.	%	Pop.	%	Pop.	%	Pop.	%	Pop.	%	Pop.	%	Pop.	%
Hisar District	541,720	67.3%	218,600	27.16%	38,508	4.78%	273	0.03%	5,767	0.72%	21	0%	804,889	100%
Loharu State	16,178	86.99%	2,401	12.91%	0	0%	0	0%	18	0.1%	0	0%	18,597	100%
Rohtak District	450,549	83.21%	86,076	15.9%	161	0.03%	334	0.06%	4,369	0.81%	0	0%	541,489	100%
Dujana State	20,161	79.11%	5,324	20.89%	0	0%	0	0%	0	0%	0	0%	25,485	100%
Gurgaon District	421,885	65.59%	217,237	33.78%	342	0.05%	782	0.12%	2,921	0.45%	10	0%	643,177	100%
Pataudi State	16,114	82.45%	3,338	17.08%	0	0%	9	0.05%	82	0.42%	0	0%	19,543	100%
Delhi District	469,561	71.4%	171,745	26.12%	2,985	0.45%	5,693	0.87%	7,539	1.15%	81	0.01%	657,604	100%
Karnal District	556,203	69.54%	224,920	28.12%	13,531	1.69%	920	0.12%	4,213	0.53%	0	0%	799,787	100%
Jalandhar District	265,378	33.09%	357,051	44.52%	176,227	21.98%	2,404	0.3%	842	0.1%	18	0%	801,920	100%
Kapurthala State	61,426	22.91%	152,117	56.73%	54,275	20.24%	107	0.04%	205	0.08%	3	0%	268,133	100%
Ludhiana District	131,370	25.4%	176,043	34.04%	207,042	40.03%	888	0.17%	1,849	0.36%	0	0%	517,192	100%
Malerkotla State	22,902	32.19%	25,942	36.46%	21,018	29.54%	14	0.02%	1,268	1.78%	0	0%	71,144	100%
Firozpur District	273,832	28.53%	418,553	43.61%	262,511	27.35%	3,342	0.35%	1,401	0.15%	18	0%	959,657	100%
Faridkot State	37,377	28.69%	37,105	28.48%	55,397	42.52%	6	0%	409	0.31%	0	0%	130,294	100%
Patiala State	563,940	40.06%	307,384	21.84%	532,292	37.81%	739	0.05%	3,282	0.23%	22	0%	1,407,659	100%
Jind State	210,222	77.36%	37,520	13.81%	22,566	8.3%	187	0.07%	1,233	0.45%	0	0%	271,728	100%
Nabha State	126,414	50.79%	46,032	18.5%	76,198	30.62%	5	0%	238	0.1%	0	0%	248,887	100%
Lahore District	217,609	21%	626,271	60.44%	169,008	16.31%	21,781	2.1%	1,139	0.11%	350	0.03%	1,036,158	100%
Amritsar District	211,708	24.04%	408,882	46.43%	253,941	28.83%	4,763	0.54%	1,386	0.16%	48	0.01%	880,728	100%
Gujranwala District	176,075	19.07%	622,430	67.4%	107,748	11.67%	16,215	1.76%	950	0.1%	1	0%	923,419	100%
Total	4,790,624	43.44%	4,144,971	37.59%	1,993,750	18.08%	58,462	0.53%	39,111	0.35%	572	0.01%	11,027,490	100%

==== 1921 census ====
Religion in the Districts & Princely States of the Indo−Gangetic Plain West geographical division (1921)
District/ Princely State	Hinduism		Islam		Sikhism		Christianity		Jainism		Others		Total	
District/ Princely State	Pop.	%	Pop.	%	Pop.	%	Pop.	%	Pop.	%	Pop.	%	Pop.	%
Hisar District	548,351	67.13%	215,943	26.44%	45,615	5.58%	1,024	0.13%	5,874	0.72%	3	0%	816,810	100%
Loharu State	17,978	87.18%	2,625	12.73%	0	0%	0	0%	18	0.09%	0	0%	20,621	100%
Rohtak District	629,592	81.52%	125,035	16.19%	602	0.08%	10,033	1.3%	7,010	0.91%	0	0%	772,272	100%
Dujana State	20,135	77.94%	5,698	22.06%	0	0%	0	0%	0	0%	0	0%	25,833	100%
Gurgaon District	460,134	67.47%	216,860	31.8%	924	0.14%	1,316	0.19%	2,762	0.4%	7	0%	682,003	100%
Pataudi State	15,090	83.38%	2,898	16.01%	0	0%	0	0%	109	0.6%	0	0%	18,097	100%
Karnal District	573,224	69.17%	235,618	28.43%	12,280	1.48%	3,382	0.41%	4,222	0.51%	0	0%	828,726	100%
Jalandhar District	244,995	29.79%	366,586	44.57%	206,130	25.06%	4,088	0.5%	736	0.09%	9	0%	822,544	100%
Kapurthala State	58,412	20.55%	160,457	56.44%	64,074	22.54%	1,100	0.39%	228	0.08%	4	0%	284,275	100%
Ludhiana District	135,512	23.87%	192,961	33.99%	235,721	41.53%	1,613	0.28%	1,796	0.32%	19	0%	567,622	100%
Malerkotla State	29,459	36.68%	28,413	35.37%	21,828	27.18%	37	0.05%	585	0.73%	0	0%	80,322	100%
Firozpur District	306,350	27.89%	482,540	43.94%	302,761	27.57%	5,365	0.49%	1,211	0.11%	21	0%	1,098,248	100%
Faridkot State	38,610	25.63%	44,813	29.74%	66,658	44.24%	107	0.07%	473	0.31%	0	0%	150,661	100%
Patiala State	642,055	42.81%	330,341	22.03%	522,675	34.85%	1,395	0.09%	3,249	0.22%	24	0%	1,499,739	100%
Jind State	234,721	76.16%	43,251	14.03%	28,026	9.09%	637	0.21%	1,548	0.5%	0	0%	308,183	100%
Nabha State	133,870	50.84%	50,756	19.27%	78,389	29.77%	41	0.02%	278	0.11%	0	0%	263,334	100%
Lahore District	255,690	22.6%	647,640	57.25%	179,975	15.91%	46,454	4.11%	1,209	0.11%	368	0.03%	1,131,336	100%
Amritsar District	204,435	22%	423,724	45.59%	287,004	30.88%	12,773	1.37%	1,375	0.15%	63	0.01%	929,374	100%
Gujranwala District	101,566	16.29%	443,147	71.06%	50,802	8.15%	27,308	4.38%	754	0.12%	4	0%	623,581	100%
Sheikhupura District	85,781	16.4%	330,880	63.25%	82,965	15.86%	23,431	4.48%	78	0.01%	0	0%	523,135	100%
Total	4,735,960	41.37%	4,350,186	38%	2,186,429	19.1%	140,104	1.22%	33,515	0.29%	522	0.005%	11,446,716	100%

==== 1931 census ====
Religion in the Districts & Princely States of the Indo−Gangetic Plain West geographical division (1931)
District/ Princely State	Islam		Hinduism		Sikhism		Christianity		Jainism		Others		Total	
District/ Princely State	Pop.	%	Pop.	%	Pop.	%	Pop.	%	Pop.	%	Pop.	%	Pop.	%
Hisar District	253,784	28.21%	583,429	64.86%	55,169	6.13%	1,107	0.12%	5,988	0.67%	2	0%	899,479	100%
Loharu State	3,119	13.36%	20,198	86.55%	2	0.01%	1	0%	18	0.08%	0	0%	23,338	100%
Rohtak District	137,880	17.11%	655,963	81.42%	596	0.07%	4,807	0.6%	6,375	0.79%	0	0%	805,621	100%
Dujana State	5,863	20.78%	22,347	79.2%	1	0%	5	0.02%	0	0%	0	0%	28,216	100%
Gurgaon District	242,357	32.74%	493,174	66.63%	500	0.07%	1,463	0.2%	2,665	0.36%	4	0%	740,163	100%
Pataudi State	3,168	16.79%	15,596	82.64%	1	0.01%	3	0.02%	105	0.56%	0	0%	18,873	100%
Karnal District	259,730	30.46%	570,297	66.89%	16,928	1.99%	1,469	0.17%	4,190	0.49%	0	0%	852,614	100%
Jalandhar District	419,556	44.46%	268,822	28.49%	249,571	26.45%	4,323	0.46%	1,379	0.15%	70	0.01%	943,721	100%
Kapurthala State	179,251	56.59%	64,319	20.31%	72,177	22.79%	983	0.31%	27	0.01%	0	0%	316,757	100%
Ludhiana District	235,598	35.03%	120,161	17.87%	312,829	46.52%	2,477	0.37%	1,419	0.21%	10	0%	672,494	100%
Malerkotla State	31,417	37.82%	21,252	25.58%	28,982	34.89%	135	0.16%	1,286	1.55%	0	0%	83,072	100%
Firozpur District	515,430	44.56%	244,688	21.15%	388,108	33.55%	7,070	0.61%	1,411	0.12%	25	0%	1,156,732	100%
Faridkot State	49,912	30.37%	20,855	12.69%	92,880	56.51%	167	0.1%	550	0.33%	0	0%	164,364	100%
Patiala State	363,920	22.39%	623,597	38.36%	632,972	38.94%	1,449	0.09%	3,578	0.22%	4	0%	1,625,520	100%
Jind State	46,002	14.17%	243,561	75.02%	33,290	10.25%	210	0.06%	1,613	0.5%	0	0%	324,676	100%
Nabha State	57,393	19.96%	132,354	46.02%	97,452	33.89%	66	0.02%	309	0.11%	0	0%	287,574	100%
Lahore District	815,820	59.18%	259,725	18.84%	244,304	17.72%	57,097	4.14%	1,450	0.11%	174	0.01%	1,378,570	100%
Amritsar District	524,676	46.97%	174,556	15.63%	399,951	35.8%	16,619	1.49%	1,272	0.11%	46	0%	1,117,120	100%
Gujranwala District	521,343	70.82%	92,764	12.6%	71,595	9.73%	49,364	6.71%	1,071	0.15%	1	0%	736,138	100%
Sheikhupura District	445,996	64.01%	81,887	11.75%	119,477	17.15%	49,266	7.07%	100	0.01%	6	0%	696,732	100%
Total	5,112,215	39.72%	4,709,545	36.59%	2,816,785	21.88%	198,081	1.54%	34,806	0.27%	342	0.003%	12,871,774	100%

==== 1941 census ====
Religion in the Districts & Princely States of the Indo−Gangetic Plain West geographical division (1941)
District/ Princely State	Islam		Hinduism		Sikhism		Christianity		Jainism		Others		Total	
District/ Princely State	Pop.	%	Pop.	%	Pop.	%	Pop.	%	Pop.	%	Pop.	%	Pop.	%
Hisar District	285,208	28.33%	652,842	64.85%	60,731	6.03%	1,292	0.13%	6,126	0.61%	510	0.05%	1,006,709	100%
Loharu State	3,960	14.2%	23,923	85.77%	7	0.03%	2	0.01%	0	0%	0	0%	27,892	100%
Rohtak District	166,569	17.42%	780,474	81.61%	1,466	0.15%	1,043	0.11%	6,847	0.72%	0	0%	956,399	100%
Dujana State	6,939	22.63%	23,727	77.37%	0	0%	0	0%	0	0%	0	0%	30,666	100%
Gurgaon District	285,992	33.59%	560,537	65.83%	637	0.07%	1,673	0.2%	2,613	0.31%	6	0%	851,458	100%
Pataudi State	3,655	16.98%	17,728	82.38%	0	0%	9	0.04%	128	0.59%	0	0%	21,520	100%
Karnal District	304,346	30.6%	666,301	66.99%	19,887	2%	1,249	0.13%	2,789	0.28%	3	0%	994,575	100%
Jalandhar District	509,804	45.23%	311,010	27.59%	298,741	26.5%	6,233	0.55%	1,395	0.12%	7	0%	1,127,190	100%
Kapurthala State	213,754	56.49%	61,546	16.27%	88,350	23.35%	1,667	0.44%	380	0.1%	12,683	3.35%	378,380	100%
Ludhiana District	302,482	36.95%	171,715	20.98%	341,175	41.68%	1,913	0.23%	1,279	0.16%	51	0.01%	818,615	100%
Malerkotla State	33,881	38.45%	23,482	26.65%	30,320	34.41%	116	0.13%	310	0.35%	0	0%	88,109	100%
Firozpur District	641,448	45.07%	287,733	20.22%	479,486	33.69%	12,607	0.89%	1,674	0.12%	128	0.01%	1,423,076	100%
Faridkot State	61,352	30.79%	21,814	10.95%	115,070	57.74%	247	0.12%	800	0.4%	0	0%	199,283	100%
Patiala State	436,539	22.55%	597,488	30.86%	896,021	46.28%	1,592	0.08%	3,101	0.16%	1,518	0.08%	1,936,259	100%
Jind State	50,972	14.09%	268,355	74.17%	40,981	11.33%	161	0.04%	1,294	0.36%	49	0.01%	361,812	100%
Nabha State	70,373	20.45%	146,518	42.59%	122,451	35.59%	221	0.06%	480	0.14%	1	0%	344,044	100%
Lahore District	1,027,772	60.62%	284,689	16.79%	310,646	18.32%	70,147	4.14%	1,951	0.12%	170	0.01%	1,695,375	100%
Amritsar District	657,695	46.52%	217,431	15.38%	510,845	36.13%	25,973	1.84%	1,911	0.14%	21	0%	1,413,876	100%
Gujranwala District	642,706	70.45%	108,115	11.85%	99,139	10.87%	60,829	6.67%	1,445	0.16%	0	0%	912,234	100%
Sheikhupura District	542,344	63.62%	89,182	10.46%	160,706	18.85%	60,054	7.04%	221	0.03%	1	0%	852,508	100%
Total	6,247,791	40.48%	5,314,610	34.43%	3,576,659	23.17%	247,028	1.6%	34,744	0.23%	15,148	0.1%	15,435,980	100%

=== Himalayan geographical division ===
Including Sirmoor State, Simla District, Simla Hill States, Bilaspur State, Kangra district, Mandi State, Suket State, and Chamba State.

Religious groups in the Himalayan geographical division of Punjab Province (1881–1951)
Religious group	1881		1901		1911		1921		1931		1941		1951	
Religious group	Pop.	%	Pop.	%	Pop.	%	Pop.	%	Pop.	%	Pop.	%	Pop.	%
Hinduism	1,458,481	94.74%	1,598,853	94.6%	1,630,084	94.53%	1,642,176	94.5%	1,729,008	94.42%	1,929,634	94.76%	2,024,692	97.24%
Islam	70,642	4.59%	76,480	4.53%	74,205	4.3%	77,425	4.46%	82,711	4.52%	87,485	4.3%	22,338	1.07%
Christianity	3,840	0.25%	3,415	0.2%	4,400	0.26%	4,471	0.26%	2,586	0.14%	2,129	0.1%	1,517	0.07%
Buddhism	3,250	0.21%	6,931	0.41%	7,518	0.44%	5,718	0.33%	7,705	0.42%	614	0.03%	1,320	0.06%
Sikhism	2,680	0.17%	3,897	0.23%	7,894	0.46%	7,610	0.44%	8,948	0.49%	12,245	0.6%	30,837	1.48%
Jainism	536	0.03%	483	0.03%	358	0.02%	356	0.02%	291	0.02%	425	0.02%	1,364	0.07%
Zoroastrianism	4	0%	7	0%	18	0%	40	0%	3	0%	3,895	0.19%	13	0%
Judaism	—N/a	—N/a	0	0%	3	0%	1	0%	1	0%	0	0%	12	0%
Others	0	0%	0	0%	0	0%	4	0%	0	0%	1	0%	0	0%
Total population	1,539,433	100%	1,690,066	100%	1,724,480	100%	1,737,801	100%	1,831,253	100%	2,036,428	100%	2,082,093	100%

==== 1901 census ====
Religion in the Districts & Princely States of the Himalayan geographical division (1901)
District/ Princely State	Hinduism		Islam		Sikhism		Christianity		Jainism		Others		Total	
District/ Princely State	Pop.	%	Pop.	%	Pop.	%	Pop.	%	Pop.	%	Pop.	%	Pop.	%
Nahan State	128,478	94.69%	6,414	4.73%	688	0.51%	46	0.03%	61	0.04%	0	0%	135,687	100%
Simla District	30,299	75.09%	6,675	16.54%	544	1.35%	2,798	6.93%	32	0.08%	3	0.01%	40,351	100%
Simla Hill States	373,886	96.03%	11,535	2.96%	1,318	0.34%	113	0.03%	274	0.07%	2,223	0.57%	389,349	100%
Kangra District	722,554	94.07%	39,672	5.16%	1,220	0.16%	385	0.05%	113	0.01%	4,180	0.54%	768,124	100%
Mandi State	170,304	97.85%	3,187	1.83%	41	0.02%	3	0%	0	0%	510	0.29%	174,045	100%
Suket State	54,005	98.77%	665	1.22%	6	0.01%	0	0%	0	0%	0	0%	54,676	100%
Chamba State	119,327	93.35%	8,332	6.52%	80	0.06%	70	0.05%	3	0%	22	0.02%	127,834	100%
Total	1,598,853	94.6%	76,480	4.53%	3,897	0.23%	3,415	0.2%	483	0.03%	6,938	0.41%	1,690,066	100%

==== 1911 census ====
Religion in the Districts & Princely States of the Himalayan geographical division (1911)
District/ Princely State	Hinduism		Islam		Sikhism		Christianity		Jainism		Others		Total	
District/ Princely State	Pop.	%	Pop.	%	Pop.	%	Pop.	%	Pop.	%	Pop.	%	Pop.	%
Nahan State	130,276	94.05%	6,016	4.34%	2,142	1.55%	37	0.03%	49	0.04%	0	0%	138,520	100%
Simla District	29,047	73.87%	5,820	14.8%	693	1.76%	3,666	9.32%	49	0.12%	45	0.11%	39,320	100%
Simla Hill States	386,953	95.7%	11,374	2.81%	2,911	0.72%	224	0.06%	172	0.04%	2,709	0.67%	404,343	100%
Kangra District	725,156	94.13%	38,859	5.04%	1,910	0.25%	386	0.05%	81	0.01%	3,994	0.52%	770,386	100%
Mandi State	178,115	98.35%	2,799	1.55%	26	0.01%	4	0%	2	0%	164	0.09%	181,110	100%
Suket State	54,268	98.8%	587	1.07%	71	0.13%	2	0%	0	0%	0	0%	54,928	100%
Chamba State	126,269	92.93%	8,750	6.44%	141	0.1%	81	0.06%	5	0%	627	0.46%	135,873	100%
Total	1,630,084	94.53%	74,205	4.3%	7,894	0.46%	4,400	0.26%	358	0.02%	7,539	0.44%	1,724,480	100%

==== 1921 census ====
Religion in the Districts & Princely States of the Himalayan geographical division (1921)
District/ Princely State	Hinduism		Islam		Sikhism		Christianity		Jainism		Others		Total	
District/ Princely State	Pop.	%	Pop.	%	Pop.	%	Pop.	%	Pop.	%	Pop.	%	Pop.	%
Nahan State	132,431	94.29%	6,449	4.59%	1,449	1.03%	44	0.03%	65	0.05%	10	0.01%	140,448	100%
Simla District	33,228	73.31%	6,953	15.34%	1,173	2.59%	3,823	8.43%	90	0.2%	60	0.13%	45,327	100%
Simla Hill States	292,768	95.45%	9,551	3.11%	2,040	0.67%	164	0.05%	142	0.05%	2,053	0.67%	306,718	100%
Bilaspur State	96,000	97.96%	1,559	1.59%	437	0.45%	4	0%	0	0%	0	0%	98,000	100%
Kangra District	722,277	94.28%	38,263	4.99%	2,083	0.27%	363	0.05%	56	0.01%	3,023	0.39%	766,065	100%
Mandi State	181,358	98.01%	3,462	1.87%	142	0.08%	10	0.01%	0	0%	76	0.04%	185,048	100%
Suket State	53,625	98.71%	659	1.21%	44	0.08%	0	0%	0	0%	0	0%	54,328	100%
Chamba State	130,489	91.98%	10,529	7.42%	242	0.17%	63	0.04%	3	0%	541	0.38%	141,867	100%
Total	1,642,176	94.5%	77,425	4.46%	7,610	0.44%	4,471	0.26%	356	0.02%	5,763	0.33%	1,737,801	100%

==== 1931 census ====
Religion in the Districts & Princely States of the Himalayan geographical division (1931)
District/ Princely State	Hinduism		Islam		Sikhism		Christianity		Jainism		Others		Total	
District/ Princely State	Pop.	%	Pop.	%	Pop.	%	Pop.	%	Pop.	%	Pop.	%	Pop.	%
Sirmoor State	139,031	93.58%	7,020	4.73%	2,413	1.62%	52	0.04%	52	0.04%	0	0%	148,568	100%
Simla District	28,661	77.91%	5,810	15.79%	760	2.07%	1,540	4.19%	1	0%	14	0.04%	36,786	100%
Simla Hill States	317,390	95.93%	10,017	3.03%	1,817	0.55%	176	0.05%	141	0.04%	1,309	0.4%	330,850	100%
Bilaspur State	99,023	98.05%	1,458	1.44%	507	0.5%	6	0.01%	0	0%	0	0%	100,994	100%
Kangra District	752,098	93.86%	40,483	5.05%	2,396	0.3%	576	0.07%	94	0.01%	5,665	0.71%	801,312	100%
Mandi State	199,935	96.37%	6,351	3.06%	899	0.43%	141	0.07%	0	0%	139	0.07%	207,465	100%
Suket State	57,616	98.64%	733	1.25%	44	0.08%	1	0%	0	0%	14	0.02%	58,408	100%
Chamba State	135,254	92.09%	10,839	7.38%	112	0.08%	94	0.06%	3	0%	568	0.39%	146,870	100%
Total	1,729,008	94.42%	82,711	4.52%	8,948	0.49%	2,586	0.14%	291	0.02%	7,709	0.42%	1,831,253	100%

==== 1941 census ====
Religion in the Districts & Princely States of the Himalayan geographical division (1941)
District/ Princely State	Hinduism		Islam		Sikhism		Christianity		Jainism		Others		Total	
District/ Princely State	Pop.	%	Pop.	%	Pop.	%	Pop.	%	Pop.	%	Pop.	%	Pop.	%
Sirmoor State	146,199	93.7%	7,374	4.73%	2,334	1.5%	38	0.02%	81	0.05%	0	0%	156,026	100%
Simla District	29,466	76.38%	7,022	18.2%	1,032	2.68%	934	2.42%	114	0.3%	8	0.02%	38,576	100%
Simla Hill States	345,716	96.16%	10,812	3.01%	2,693	0.75%	161	0.04%	126	0.04%	12	0%	359,520	100%
Bilaspur State	108,375	98.22%	1,498	1.36%	453	0.41%	7	0.01%	3	0%	0	0%	110,336	100%
Kangra District	846,531	94.12%	43,249	4.81%	4,809	0.53%	788	0.09%	101	0.01%	3,899	0.43%	899,377	100%
Mandi State	227,463	97.79%	4,328	1.86%	583	0.25%	11	0%	0	0%	208	0.09%	232,593	100%
Suket State	69,974	98.43%	884	1.24%	234	0.33%	0	0%	0	0%	0	0%	71,092	100%
Chamba State	155,910	92.3%	12,318	7.29%	107	0.06%	190	0.11%	0	0%	383	0.23%	168,908	100%
Total	1,929,634	94.76%	87,485	4.3%	12,245	0.6%	2,129	0.1%	425	0.02%	4,510	0.22%	2,036,428	100%

=== Sub−Himalayan geographical division ===
Including Ambala district, Kalsia State, Hoshiarpur district, Gurdaspur district, Sialkot District, Gujrat District, Jhelum District, Rawalpindi District, and Attock District.

Religious groups in the Sub—Himalayan geographical division of Punjab Province (1881–1951)
Religious group	1881		1901		1911		1921		1931		1941		1951	
Religious group	Pop.	%	Pop.	%	Pop.	%	Pop.	%	Pop.	%	Pop.	%	Pop.	%
Islam	3,511,174	58.8%	3,741,759	60.62%	3,551,989	61.19%	3,587,246	61.44%	4,009,166	61.99%	4,751,911	62.32%	4,846,714	61.77%
Hinduism	2,159,634	36.17%	2,042,505	33.09%	1,588,097	27.36%	1,556,703	26.66%	1,565,034	24.2%	1,799,915	23.6%	1,968,976	25.09%
Sikhism	284,592	4.77%	350,587	5.68%	565,596	9.74%	570,759	9.78%	753,168	11.65%	906,802	11.89%	884,063	11.27%
Christianity	10,363	0.17%	29,930	0.48%	92,524	1.59%	117,172	2.01%	132,500	2.05%	155,386	2.04%	141,602	1.8%
Jainism	5,231	0.09%	7,278	0.12%	6,695	0.12%	6,866	0.12%	7,299	0.11%	9,172	0.12%	5,483	0.07%
Zoroastrianism	200	0%	117	0%	152	0%	111	0%	76	0%	141	0%	7	0%
Buddhism	0	0%	6	0%	11	0%	8	0%	22	0%	171	0%	19	0%
Judaism	—N/a	—N/a	5	0%	17	0%	1	0%	7	0%	6	0%	16	0%
Others	1	0%	0	0%	0	0%	3	0%	0	0%	1,681	0.02%	14	0%
Total population	5,971,195	100%	6,172,187	100%	5,805,081	100%	5,838,869	100%	6,467,272	100%	7,625,185	100%	7,846,894	100%

==== 1901 census ====
Religion in the Districts & Princely States of the Sub−Himalayan geographical division (1901)
District/ Princely State	Islam		Hinduism		Sikhism		Christianity		Jainism		Others		Total	
District/ Princely State	Pop.	%	Pop.	%	Pop.	%	Pop.	%	Pop.	%	Pop.	%	Pop.	%
Ambala District	240,710	29.5%	510,105	62.52%	58,073	7.12%	4,362	0.53%	2,614	0.32%	16	0%	815,880	100%
Kalsia State	21,921	32.63%	38,626	57.5%	6,453	9.61%	0	0%	181	0.27%	0	0%	67,181	100%
Hoshiarpur District	312,958	31.62%	603,710	60.99%	71,126	7.19%	813	0.08%	1,173	0.12%	2	0%	989,782	100%
Gurdaspur District	463,371	49.28%	380,636	40.48%	91,756	9.76%	4,471	0.48%	72	0.01%	28	0%	940,334	100%
Sialkot District	716,953	66.15%	302,012	27.86%	50,982	4.7%	11,939	1.1%	2,008	0.19%	15	0%	1,083,909	100%
Gujrat District	655,838	87.38%	69,346	9.24%	24,893	3.32%	460	0.06%	11	0%	0	0%	750,548	100%
Jhelum District	526,725	88.67%	51,801	8.72%	15,070	2.54%	271	0.05%	151	0.03%	0	0%	594,018	100%
Rawalpindi District	803,283	86.32%	86,269	9.27%	32,234	3.46%	7,614	0.82%	1,068	0.11%	67	0.01%	930,535	100%
Total	3,741,759	60.62%	2,042,505	33.09%	350,587	5.68%	29,930	0.48%	7,278	0.12%	128	0.002%	6,172,187	100%

==== 1911 census ====
Religion in the Districts & Princely States of the Sub−Himalayan geographical division (1911)
District/ Princely State	Islam		Hinduism		Sikhism		Christianity		Jainism		Others		Total	
District/ Princely State	Pop.	%	Pop.	%	Pop.	%	Pop.	%	Pop.	%	Pop.	%	Pop.	%
Ambala District	205,203	29.74%	380,592	55.16%	94,471	13.69%	7,483	1.08%	2,187	0.32%	34	0%	689,970	100%
Kalsia State	18,820	33.66%	30,640	54.8%	6,258	11.19%	31	0.06%	160	0.29%	0	0%	55,909	100%
Hoshiarpur District	281,805	30.68%	498,642	54.28%	134,146	14.6%	2,978	0.32%	998	0.11%	0	0%	918,569	100%
Gurdaspur District	408,216	48.78%	284,017	33.94%	121,078	14.47%	23,365	2.79%	73	0.01%	22	0%	836,771	100%
Sialkot District	604,801	61.74%	242,325	24.74%	81,761	8.35%	48,620	4.96%	2,029	0.21%	17	0%	979,553	100%
Gujrat District	650,893	87.29%	49,430	6.63%	44,693	5.99%	570	0.08%	48	0.01%	0	0%	745,634	100%
Jhelum District	452,260	88.41%	34,261	6.7%	24,436	4.78%	450	0.09%	163	0.03%	5	0%	511,575	100%
Rawalpindi District	458,101	83.62%	48,449	8.84%	31,839	5.81%	8,320	1.52%	1,028	0.19%	90	0.02%	547,827	100%
Attock District	471,890	90.88%	19,741	3.8%	26,914	5.18%	707	0.14%	9	0%	12	0%	519,273	100%
Total	3,551,989	61.19%	1,588,097	27.36%	565,596	9.74%	92,524	1.59%	6,695	0.12%	180	0.003%	5,805,081	100%

==== 1921 census ====
Religion in the Districts & Princely States of the Sub−Himalayan geographical division (1921)
District/ Princely State	Islam		Hinduism		Sikhism		Christianity		Jainism		Others		Total	
District/ Princely State	Pop.	%	Pop.	%	Pop.	%	Pop.	%	Pop.	%	Pop.	%	Pop.	%
Ambala District	205,750	30.19%	370,125	54.31%	97,614	14.32%	5,679	0.83%	2,272	0.33%	37	0.01%	681,477	100%
Kalsia State	20,394	35.55%	28,769	50.15%	8,014	13.97%	4	0.01%	190	0.33%	0	0%	57,371	100%
Hoshiarpur District	289,298	31.19%	500,339	53.95%	132,958	14.34%	3,745	0.4%	1,079	0.12%	0	0%	927,419	100%
Gurdaspur District	422,877	49.62%	258,823	30.37%	137,625	16.15%	32,832	3.85%	20	0%	15	0%	852,192	100%
Sialkot District	580,532	61.9%	217,912	23.24%	74,939	7.99%	62,266	6.64%	2,147	0.23%	27	0%	937,823	100%
Gujrat District	709,684	86.12%	62,529	7.59%	49,456	6%	2,373	0.29%	4	0%	0	0%	824,046	100%
Jhelum District	422,979	88.66%	34,837	7.3%	18,626	3.9%	430	0.09%	195	0.04%	1	0%	477,068	100%
Rawalpindi District	470,038	82.58%	57,185	10.05%	31,718	5.57%	9,286	1.63%	954	0.17%	43	0.01%	569,224	100%
Attock District	465,694	90.91%	26,184	5.11%	19,809	3.87%	557	0.11%	5	0%	0	0%	512,249	100%
Total	3,587,246	61.44%	1,556,703	26.66%	570,759	9.78%	117,172	2.01%	6,866	0.12%	123	0.002%	5,838,869	100%

==== 1931 census ====
Religion in the Districts & Princely States of the Sub−Himalayan geographical division (1931)
District/ Princely State	Islam		Hinduism		Sikhism		Christianity		Jainism		Others		Total	
District/ Princely State	Pop.	%	Pop.	%	Pop.	%	Pop.	%	Pop.	%	Pop.	%	Pop.	%
Ambala District	230,837	31.07%	346,809	46.68%	155,555	20.94%	7,141	0.96%	2,550	0.34%	10	0%	742,902	100%
Kalsia State	21,797	36.42%	28,832	48.18%	9,035	15.1%	22	0.04%	162	0.27%	0	0%	59,848	100%
Hoshiarpur District	328,078	31.78%	526,182	50.98%	173,147	16.77%	3,764	0.36%	1,016	0.1%	0	0%	1,032,187	100%
Gurdaspur District	493,216	50.8%	255,949	26.36%	178,471	18.38%	43,243	4.45%	15	0%	4	0%	970,898	100%
Sialkot District	609,633	62.23%	206,421	21.07%	94,955	9.69%	66,365	6.77%	2,236	0.23%	7	0%	979,617	100%
Gujrat District	786,750	85.29%	73,356	7.95%	59,188	6.42%	3,097	0.34%	32	0%	4	0%	922,427	100%
Jhelum District	482,097	89.1%	36,068	6.67%	22,030	4.07%	672	0.12%	209	0.04%	0	0%	541,076	100%
Rawalpindi District	524,965	82.76%	59,485	9.38%	41,265	6.51%	7,486	1.18%	1,077	0.17%	79	0.01%	634,357	100%
Attock District	531,793	91.07%	31,932	5.47%	19,522	3.34%	710	0.12%	2	0%	1	0%	583,960	100%
Total	4,009,166	61.99%	1,565,034	24.2%	753,168	11.65%	132,500	2.05%	7,299	0.11%	105	0.002%	6,467,272	100%

==== 1941 census ====
Religion in the Districts & Princely States of the Sub−Himalayan geographical division (1941)
District/ Princely State	Islam		Hinduism		Sikhism		Christianity		Jainism		Others		Total	
District/ Princely State	Pop.	%	Pop.	%	Pop.	%	Pop.	%	Pop.	%	Pop.	%	Pop.	%
Ambala District	268,999	31.73%	412,658	48.68%	156,543	18.47%	6,065	0.72%	3,065	0.36%	415	0.05%	847,745	100%
Kalsia State	25,049	37.17%	29,866	44.32%	12,235	18.15%	55	0.08%	188	0.28%	0	0%	67,393	100%
Hoshiarpur District	380,759	32.53%	584,080	49.91%	198,194	16.93%	6,165	0.53%	1,125	0.1%	0	0%	1,170,323	100%
Gurdaspur District	589,923	51.14%	290,774	25.21%	221,261	19.18%	51,522	4.47%	25	0%	6	0%	1,153,511	100%
Sialkot District	739,218	62.09%	231,319	19.43%	139,409	11.71%	75,831	6.37%	3,250	0.27%	1,470	0.12%	1,190,497	100%
Gujrat District	945,609	85.58%	84,643	7.66%	70,233	6.36%	4,449	0.4%	10	0%	8	0%	1,104,952	100%
Jhelum District	563,033	89.42%	40,888	6.49%	24,680	3.92%	893	0.14%	159	0.03%	5	0%	629,658	100%
Rawalpindi District	628,193	80%	82,478	10.5%	64,127	8.17%	9,014	1.15%	1,337	0.17%	82	0.01%	785,231	100%
Attock District	611,128	90.42%	43,209	6.39%	20,120	2.98%	1,392	0.21%	13	0%	13	0%	675,875	100%
Total	4,751,911	62.32%	1,799,915	23.6%	906,802	11.89%	155,386	2.04%	9,172	0.12%	1,999	0.03%	7,625,185	100%

=== North−West Dry Area geographical division ===
Including Montgomery District, Shahpur District, Mianwali District, Lyallpur District, Jhang District, Multan District, Bahawalpur State, Muzaffargarh District, Dera Ghazi Khan District, and the Biloch Trans–Frontier Tract.

Religious groups in the North—West Dry Area geographical division of Punjab Province (1881–1951)
Religious group	1881		1901		1911		1921		1931		1941		1951	
Religious group	Pop.	%	Pop.	%	Pop.	%	Pop.	%	Pop.	%	Pop.	%	Pop.	%
Islam	2,539,038	82.68%	3,883,740	79.01%	4,504,312	80%	4,798,526	78.95%	5,725,804	78.22%	7,172,557	77.86%	11,731,713	98.89%
Hinduism	501,159	16.32%	877,147	17.84%	764,816	13.58%	864,812	14.23%	1,014,922	13.86%	1,292,390	14.03%	13,957	0.12%
Sikhism	28,020	0.91%	142,955	2.91%	316,489	5.62%	342,498	5.64%	492,723	6.73%	620,479	6.74%	—N/a	—N/a
Christianity	2,122	0.07%	11,143	0.23%	44,365	0.79%	71,192	1.17%	86,186	1.18%	107,923	1.17%	117,589	0.99%
Jainism	326	0.01%	345	0.01%	611	0.01%	584	0.01%	744	0.01%	1,134	0.01%	—N/a	—N/a
Zoroastrianism	70	0%	54	0%	71	0%	57	0%	176	0%	88	0%	17	0%
Buddhism	0	0%	0	0%	29	0%	2	0%	3	0%	30	0%	0	0%
Judaism	—N/a	—N/a	0	0%	6	0%	3	0%	0	0%	3	0%	—N/a	—N/a
Others	7	0%	0	0%	0	0%	0	0%	0	0%	17,664	0.19%	0	0%
Total population	3,070,742	100%	4,915,384	100%	5,630,699	100%	6,077,674	100%	7,320,558	100%	9,212,268	100%	11,863,276	100%

==== 1901 census ====
Religion in the Districts & Princely States of the North−West Dry Area geographical division (1901)
District/ Princely State	Islam		Hinduism		Sikhism		Christianity		Jainism		Others		Total	
District/ Princely State	Pop.	%	Pop.	%	Pop.	%	Pop.	%	Pop.	%	Pop.	%	Pop.	%
Montgomery District	334,474	72.15%	109,945	23.72%	19,092	4.12%	66	0.01%	8	0%	1	0%	463,586	100%
Shahpur District	442,921	84.49%	68,489	13.06%	12,756	2.43%	91	0.02%	2	0%	0	0%	524,259	100%
Mianwali District	371,674	87.54%	50,202	11.82%	2,633	0.62%	44	0.01%	35	0.01%	0	0%	424,588	100%
Lyallpur District	484,657	61.2%	210,459	26.58%	88,049	11.12%	8,672	1.1%	23	0%	1	0%	791,861	100%
Jhang District	295,481	78.03%	79,650	21.03%	3,526	0.93%	38	0.01%	0	0%	0	0%	378,695	100%
Multan District	570,254	80.25%	133,560	18.79%	4,662	0.66%	1,964	0.28%	134	0.02%	52	0.01%	710,626	100%
Muzaffargarh District	350,177	86.32%	52,221	12.87%	3,225	0.8%	33	0.01%	0	0%	0	0%	405,656	100%
Dera Ghazi Khan District	412,012	87.45%	57,815	12.27%	1,027	0.22%	152	0.03%	143	0.03%	0	0%	471,149	100%
Bahawalpur State	598,139	82.97%	114,670	15.91%	7,985	1.11%	83	0.01%	0	0%	0	0%	720,877	100%
Biloch Trans–Frontier Tract	23,951	99.44%	136	0.56%	0	0%	0	0%	0	0%	0	0%	24,087	100%
Total	3,883,740	79.01%	877,147	17.84%	142,955	2.91%	11,143	0.23%	345	0.01%	54	0.001%	4,915,384	100%

==== 1911 census ====
Religion in the Districts & Princely States of the North−West Dry Area geographical division (1911)
District/ Princely State	Islam		Hinduism		Sikhism		Christianity		Jainism		Others		Total	
District/ Princely State	Pop.	%	Pop.	%	Pop.	%	Pop.	%	Pop.	%	Pop.	%	Pop.	%
Montgomery District	399,723	74.67%	66,803	12.48%	68,175	12.74%	581	0.11%	13	0%	4	0%	535,299	100%
Shahpur District	572,565	83.3%	72,695	10.58%	33,456	4.87%	8,616	1.25%	5	0%	29	0%	687,366	100%
Mianwali District	299,971	87.87%	36,326	10.64%	4,881	1.43%	168	0.05%	31	0.01%	0	0%	341,377	100%
Lyallpur District	524,288	61.13%	154,603	18.03%	146,670	17.1%	32,023	3.73%	125	0.01%	2	0%	857,711	100%
Jhang District	422,468	81.95%	73,426	14.24%	19,427	3.77%	201	0.04%	4	0%	0	0%	515,526	100%
Multan District	665,488	81.67%	126,603	15.54%	19,881	2.44%	2,441	0.3%	394	0.05%	64	0.01%	814,871	100%
Muzaffargarh District	494,915	86.91%	68,158	11.97%	6,322	1.11%	60	0.01%	1	0%	5	0%	569,461	100%
Dera Ghazi Khan District	442,234	88.47%	56,485	11.3%	1,042	0.21%	76	0.02%	23	0%	0	0%	499,860	100%
Bahawalpur State	654,247	83.81%	109,548	14.03%	16,630	2.13%	199	0.03%	15	0%	2	0%	780,641	100%
Biloch Trans–Frontier Tract	28,413	99.39%	169	0.59%	5	0.02%	0	0%	0	0%	0	0%	28,587	100%
Total	4,504,312	80%	764,816	13.58%	316,489	5.62%	44,365	0.79%	611	0.01%	106	0.002%	5,630,699	100%

==== 1921 census ====
Religion in the Districts & Princely States of the North−West Dry Area geographical division (1921)
District/ Princely State	Islam		Hinduism		Sikhism		Christianity		Jainism		Others		Total	
District/ Princely State	Pop.	%	Pop.	%	Pop.	%	Pop.	%	Pop.	%	Pop.	%	Pop.	%
Montgomery District	513,055	71.88%	94,791	13.28%	95,520	13.38%	10,408	1.46%	12	0%	0	0%	713,786	100%
Shahpur District	596,100	82.8%	82,182	11.42%	30,361	4.22%	11,270	1.57%	3	0%	2	0%	719,918	100%
Mianwali District	308,876	86.23%	45,974	12.83%	2,986	0.83%	369	0.1%	0	0%	0	0%	358,205	100%
Lyallpur District	594,917	60.74%	181,488	18.53%	160,821	16.42%	42,004	4.29%	231	0.02%	2	0%	979,463	100%
Jhang District	475,388	83.32%	85,339	14.96%	9,376	1.64%	449	0.08%	7	0%	0	0%	570,559	100%
Multan District	731,605	82.18%	134,013	15.05%	18,562	2.08%	6,006	0.67%	28	0%	50	0.01%	890,264	100%
Muzaffargarh District	493,369	86.79%	69,878	12.29%	4,869	0.86%	356	0.06%	6	0%	0	0%	568,478	100%
Dera Ghazi Khan District	411,431	87.72%	56,346	12.01%	932	0.2%	47	0.01%	296	0.06%	0	0%	469,052	100%
Bahawalpur State	647,207	82.85%	114,621	14.67%	19,071	2.44%	283	0.04%	1	0%	8	0%	781,191	100%
Biloch Trans–Frontier Tract	26,578	99.33%	180	0.67%	0	0%	0	0%	0	0%	0	0%	26,758	100%
Total	4,798,526	78.95%	864,812	14.23%	342,498	5.64%	71,192	1.17%	584	0.01%	62	0.001%	6,077,674	100%

==== 1931 census ====
Religion in the Districts & Princely States of the North−West Dry Area geographical division (1931)
District/ Princely State	Islam		Hinduism		Sikhism		Christianity		Jainism		Others		Total	
District/ Princely State	Pop.	%	Pop.	%	Pop.	%	Pop.	%	Pop.	%	Pop.	%	Pop.	%
Montgomery District	697,542	69.77%	136,783	13.68%	148,155	14.82%	17,245	1.72%	38	0%	9	0%	999,772	100%
Shahpur District	679,546	82.72%	90,561	11.02%	40,074	4.88%	11,294	1.37%	14	0%	1	0%	821,490	100%
Mianwali District	357,109	86.77%	49,794	12.1%	4,231	1.03%	380	0.09%	20	0%	5	0%	411,539	100%
Lyallpur District	720,996	62.62%	173,344	15.06%	211,391	18.36%	45,518	3.95%	95	0.01%	7	0%	1,151,351	100%
Jhang District	552,853	83.16%	102,990	15.49%	8,476	1.27%	494	0.07%	0	0%	20	0%	664,833	100%
Multan District	942,937	80.26%	182,029	15.49%	39,453	3.36%	9,924	0.84%	440	0.04%	117	0.01%	1,174,900	100%
Muzaffargarh District	513,265	86.79%	72,577	12.27%	5,287	0.89%	246	0.04%	0	0%	0	0%	591,375	100%
Dera Ghazi Khan District	432,911	88.16%	57,217	11.65%	760	0.15%	31	0.01%	125	0.03%	0	0%	491,044	100%
Bahawalpur State	799,176	81.17%	149,454	15.18%	34,896	3.54%	1,054	0.11%	12	0%	20	0%	984,612	100%
Biloch Trans–Frontier Tract	29,469	99.42%	173	0.58%	0	0%	0	0%	0	0%	0	0%	29,642	100%
Total	5,725,804	78.22%	1,014,922	13.86%	492,723	6.73%	86,186	1.18%	744	0.01%	179	0.002%	7,320,558	100%

==== 1941 census ====
Religion in the Districts & Princely States of the North−West Dry Area geographical division (1941)
District/ Princely State	Islam		Hinduism		Sikhism		Christianity		Jainism		Others		Total	
District/ Princely State	Pop.	%	Pop.	%	Pop.	%	Pop.	%	Pop.	%	Pop.	%	Pop.	%
Montgomery District	918,564	69.11%	210,966	15.87%	175,064	13.17%	24,432	1.84%	49	0%	28	0%	1,329,103	100%
Shahpur District	835,918	83.68%	102,172	10.23%	48,046	4.81%	12,770	1.28%	13	0%	2	0%	998,921	100%
Mianwali District	436,260	86.16%	62,814	12.41%	6,865	1.36%	358	0.07%	23	0%	1	0%	506,321	100%
Lyallpur District	877,518	62.85%	204,059	14.61%	262,737	18.82%	51,948	3.72%	35	0%	8	0%	1,396,305	100%
Jhang District	678,736	82.61%	129,889	15.81%	12,238	1.49%	763	0.09%	5	0%	0	0%	821,631	100%
Multan District	1,157,911	78.01%	249,872	16.83%	61,628	4.15%	14,290	0.96%	552	0.04%	80	0.01%	1,484,333	100%
Muzaffargarh District	616,074	86.42%	90,643	12.72%	5,882	0.83%	227	0.03%	0	0%	23	0%	712,849	100%
Dera Ghazi Khan District	512,678	88.19%	67,407	11.59%	1,072	0.18%	87	0.01%	106	0.02%	0	0%	581,350	100%
Bahawalpur State	1,098,814	81.93%	174,408	13%	46,945	3.5%	3,048	0.23%	351	0.03%	17,643	1.32%	1,341,209	100%
Biloch Trans–Frontier Tract	40,084	99.6%	160	0.4%	2	0%	0	0%	0	0%	0	0%	40,246	100%
Total	7,172,557	77.86%	1,292,390	14.03%	620,479	6.74%	107,923	1.17%	1,134	0.01%	17,785	0.19%	9,212,268	100%

== See also ==
- Punjabi folk religion
- Hinduism
- Sikhism
- Islam
- Buddhism
- Jainism (see Bhabra for a Punjabi community that follows Jainism)
- West Punjab
- Punjab, Pakistan
- East Punjab
- Punjab, India
  - Demographics of Punjab, India
- Haryana
- Himachal Pradesh

== Bibliography ==
- Dyson, Tim (2018), A Population History of India: From the First Modern People to the Present Day, Oxford University Press, ISBN 978-0-19-882905-8
- Halbfass, Wilhelm (1991), Tradition and Reflection: Explorations in Indian Thought, State University of New York Press, ISBN 0-7914-0362-9
- Michaels, Alex (2004) [1998], Hinduism: Past and Present, translated by Barbara Harshaw, Princeton University Press, ISBN 0691089523
