= East Punjab =

Former province of India from 1947 to 1950

- Former Province of India
- 1947–1950
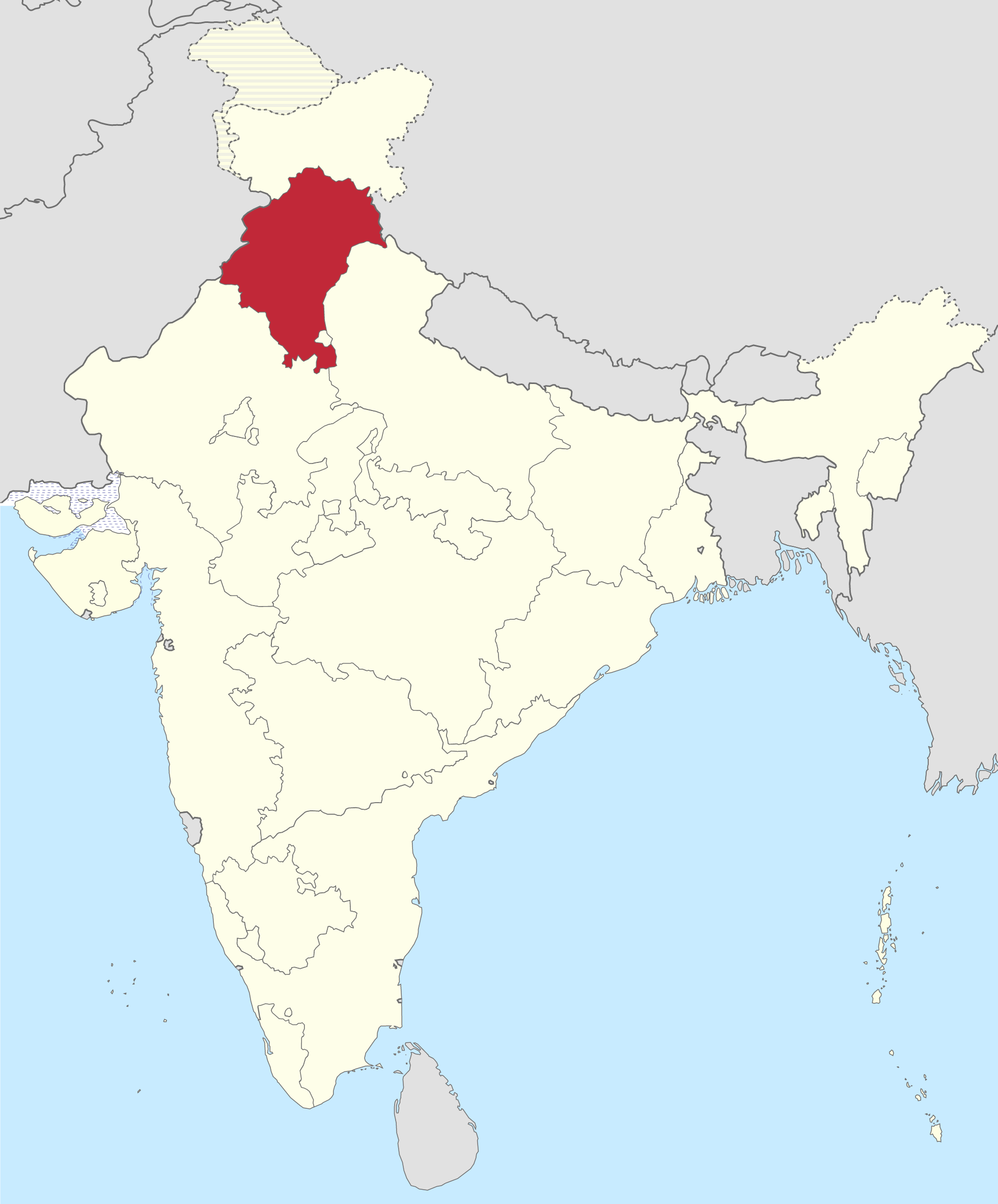
- Province of East Punjab in India
- Capital: Shimla
- Demonym: Punjabi
- Area
  - 1947–1950: 150,361 km^{2} (58,055 sq mi)
- Population
  - 1951: 1,326,520
- Government
  - Type: Self-governing province subject to the central government
- Historical era: Cold War
  - Established: 15 August 1947
  - Punjab Hill States Union formed: 15 April 1948
  - Patiala and East Punjab States Union formed: 15 July 1948
  - Disestablished: 26 January 1950
- Political subdivisions: Ambala Division; Jullundur Division; Punjab States Agency
Preceded by
Punjab Province
Succeeded by
Punjab
Punjab Hill States Union
Patiala and East Punjab States Union
- Today part of: Punjab; Haryana; Himachal Pradesh; Chandigarh

East Punjab was a province of the Dominion of India from 1947 until 1950. It consist of parts of the Punjab Province of British India that remained in India following the partition of the state between the new dominions of Pakistan and India by the Radcliffe Commission in 1947. The mostly Muslim western parts of the old Punjab became Pakistan's West Punjab, later, renamed as Punjab Province, while the mostly Hindu and Sikh eastern parts remained with India.

== History ==
=== Partition of India ===
With the partition of India, the Punjab province was to be divided in two as per the Indian Independence Act 1947, passed by the parliament of the United Kingdom. The province was to cease to exist, and two new provinces were to be constituted, to be known respectively as West Punjab and East Punjab.

All the princely states of the Punjab States Agency, except Bahawalpur, which acceded to the Dominion of Pakistan, acceded to the new Union of India. These states initially formed up a division of East Punjab, called the Punjab States Agency. Most of them were later merged to form the Patiala and East Punjab States Union (PEPSU), on 15 July 1948. The remaining northeastern Hill States of Punjab Province were united and declared a union territory on 15 April 1948 as the Punjab Hill States Union, which was renamed Himachal Pradesh on 26 January 1950.

=== Renaming of the state ===
Administrative divisions of India in 1951

The Constitution of India, which came into effect on 26 January 1950, renamed the "East Punjab" as "Punjab", and changed its status from a province to a state.

=== Reorganisation of Indian States ===
On 1 November 1956, when the States Reorganisation Act came into effect, the erstwhile princely states constituting the Patiala and East Punjab States Union (PEPSU) were merged back into the state of Punjab, restoring the state's boundaries to roughly what they had been in 1947.

=== Punjabi Suba movement ===
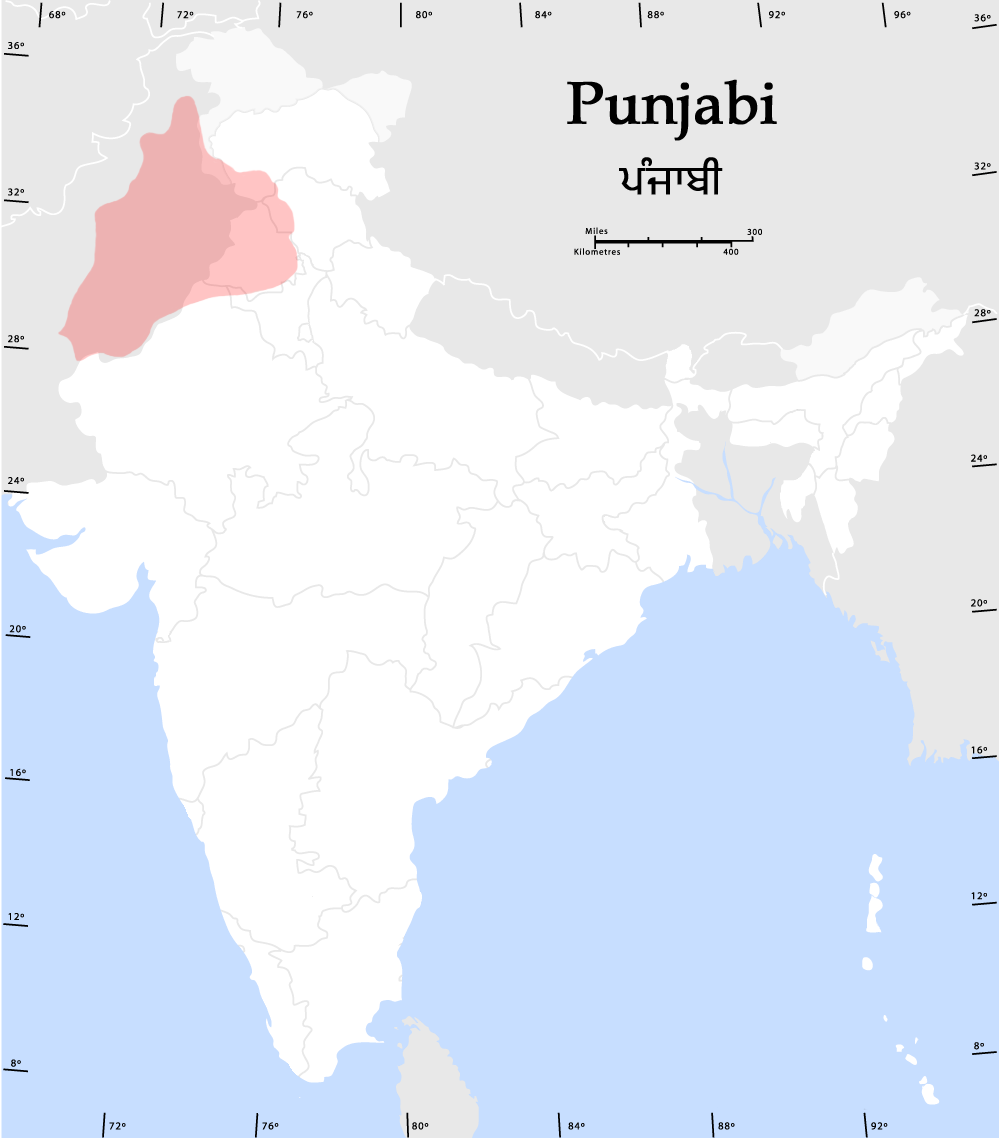
A map of the distribution of native Punjabi speakers in India and Pakistan

With effect from 1 November 1966, there was yet another Reorganisation, this time on linguistic lines, when the state of Punjab as constituted in 1956 was divided into four: the mostly Hindi-speaking part became the present-day Indian state of Haryana and the mostly Punjabi-speaking part became the present-day Punjab, major hill tracts, including Shimla, Kullu, Dharamshala, Solan, Nalagarh, Manali, and many others, were transferred to Himachal Pradesh, while a new union territory (Chandigarh) was also created, to serve as a capital to both Punjab and Haryana.

== Demography ==
=== 1941 census ===
Religions in East Punjab, India region (1941) (Note: 1941 figure taken from census data by combining the total population of all districts (Hisar, Rohtak, Gurgaon, Karnal, Jalandhar, Ludhiana, Firozpur, Amritsar, Simla, Kangra, Ambala, Hoshiarpur, and Gurdaspur (minus Shakargarh Tehsil)), and princely states (Loharu, Dujana, Pataudi, Kalsia, Kapurthala, Malerkotla, Faridkot, Patiala, Jind, Nabha, Sirmoor, Simla Hill, Bilaspur, Mandi, Suket, and Chamba) in Punjab Province, British India that ultimately fell on the eastern side of the Radcliffe Line. See 1941 census data here: Immediately following the partition of India in 1947, these districts and princely states would ultimately make up the subdivision of East Punjab, which also included Patiala and East Punjab States Union, Chief Commissioner's Province of Himachal Pradesh, and Bilaspur State. The states that make up this region in the contemporary era are Punjab, India, Chandigarh, Haryana, and Himachal Pradesh.)
1. Hinduism (Note: Including Ad-Dharmis) (47.0%)
2. Islam (30.9%)
3. Sikhism (21.1%)
4. Christianity (0.69%)
5. Jainism (0.21%)
6. Others (Note: Including Buddhism, Zoroastrianism, Judaism, Tribals, others, or not stated) (0.12%)

Prior to partition, the eastern portion of Punjab that was ultimately awarded to India following the demarcation of the Radcliffe Line was made into a new province – East Punjab. The area includes the contemporary states of Punjab, Haryana, and Himachal Pradesh. Below is the religious demographics of this region broken down by district and princely state with an overall total as per the 1941 Indian census.

Religion in the Districts & Princely States of East Punjab, India region (1941)
District/ Princely state	Hinduism		Islam		Sikhism		Christianity		Jainism		Others		Total	
District/ Princely state	Pop.	%	Pop.	%	Pop.	%	Pop.	%	Pop.	%	Pop.	%	Pop.	%
Patiala State	597,488	30.86%	436,539	22.55%	896,021	46.28%	1,592	0.08%	3,101	0.16%	1,518	0.08%	1,936,259	100%
Firozpur district	287,733	20.22%	641,448	45.07%	479,486	33.69%	12,607	0.89%	1,674	0.12%	128	0.01%	1,423,076	100%
Amritsar district	217,431	15.38%	657,695	46.52%	510,845	36.13%	25,973	1.84%	1,911	0.14%	21	0%	1,413,876	100%
Hoshiarpur district	584,080	49.91%	380,759	32.53%	198,194	16.93%	6,165	0.53%	1,125	0.1%	0	0%	1,170,323	100%
Jalandhar district	311,010	27.59%	509,804	45.23%	298,741	26.5%	6,233	0.55%	1,395	0.12%	7	0%	1,127,190	100%
Hisar district	652,842	64.85%	285,208	28.33%	60,731	6.03%	1,292	0.13%	6,126	0.61%	510	0.05%	1,006,709	100%
Karnal district	666,301	66.99%	304,346	30.6%	19,887	2%	1,249	0.13%	2,789	0.28%	3	0%	994,575	100%
Rohtak district	780,474	81.61%	166,569	17.42%	1,466	0.15%	1,043	0.11%	6,847	0.72%	0	0%	956,399	100%
Kangra district	846,531	94.12%	43,249	4.81%	4,809	0.53%	788	0.09%	101	0.01%	3,899	0.43%	899,377	100%
Gurdaspur district (Note: Does not include Shakargarh Tehsil, which was awarded to Pakistan as part of the Radcliffe Line.)	174,221	20.21%	440,323	51.08%	200,688	23.28%	46,743	5.42%	25	0%	6	0%	862,006	100%
Gurgaon district	560,537	65.83%	285,992	33.59%	637	0.07%	1,673	0.2%	2,613	0.31%	6	0%	851,458	100%
Ambala district	412,658	48.68%	268,999	31.73%	156,543	18.47%	6,065	0.72%	3,065	0.36%	415	0.05%	847,745	100%
Ludhiana district	171,715	20.98%	302,482	36.95%	341,175	41.68%	1,913	0.23%	1,279	0.16%	51	0.01%	818,615	100%
Kapurthala State	61,546	16.27%	213,754	56.49%	88,350	23.35%	1,667	0.44%	380	0.1%	12,683	3.35%	378,380	100%
Jind State	268,355	74.17%	50,972	14.09%	40,981	11.33%	161	0.04%	1,294	0.36%	49	0.01%	361,812	100%
Simla Hill States	345,716	96.16%	10,812	3.01%	2,693	0.75%	161	0.04%	126	0.04%	12	0%	359,520	100%
Nabha State	146,518	42.59%	70,373	20.45%	122,451	35.59%	221	0.06%	480	0.14%	1	0%	344,044	100%
Mandi State	227,463	97.79%	4,328	1.86%	583	0.25%	11	0%	0	0%	208	0.09%	232,593	100%
Faridkot State	21,814	10.95%	61,352	30.79%	115,070	57.74%	247	0.12%	800	0.4%	0	0%	199,283	100%
Chamba State	155,910	92.3%	12,318	7.29%	107	0.06%	190	0.11%	0	0%	383	0.23%	168,908	100%
Sirmoor State	146,199	93.7%	7,374	4.73%	2,334	1.5%	38	0.02%	81	0.05%	0	0%	156,026	100%
Bilaspur State	108,375	98.22%	1,498	1.36%	453	0.41%	7	0.01%	3	0%	0	0%	110,336	100%
Malerkotla State	23,482	26.65%	33,881	38.45%	30,320	34.41%	116	0.13%	310	0.35%	0	0%	88,109	100%
Suket State	69,974	98.43%	884	1.24%	234	0.33%	0	0%	0	0%	0	0%	71,092	100%
Kalsia State	29,866	44.32%	25,049	37.17%	12,235	18.15%	55	0.08%	188	0.28%	0	0%	67,393	100%
Simla District	29,466	76.38%	7,022	18.2%	1,032	2.68%	934	2.42%	114	0.3%	8	0.02%	38,576	100%
Dujana State	23,727	77.37%	6,939	22.63%	0	0%	0	0%	0	0%	0	0%	30,666	100%
Loharu State	23,923	85.77%	3,960	14.2%	7	0.03%	2	0.01%	0	0%	0	0%	27,892	100%
Pataudi State	17,728	82.38%	3,655	16.98%	0	0%	9	0.04%	128	0.59%	0	0%	21,520	100%
Total	7,963,083	46.95%	5,237,584	30.88%	3,586,073	21.14%	117,155	0.69%	35,955	0.21%	19,908	0.12%	16,959,758	100%
Note 1: Territory comprises the contemporary subdivisions of Punjab, India, Chandigarh, Haryana, and Himachal Pradesh. Note 2: 186 villages and 2 towns — Khemkaran and Patti — in Kasur Tehsil (Lahore District) fell on the eastern (Indian) side of the Radcliffe Line, but their population numbers are not included here as detailed sub-tehsil religious data did not exist at the time. According to the 1951 census, Kasur Tehsil had a total of 322 villages and 3 towns, roughly half of which fell on the western (Pakistani) side of the Radcliffe Line.

=== 1951 census ===
Religions in East Punjab, India region (1951) (Note: Immediately following the partition of India in 1947, districts and Princely states that ultimately fell on the eastern side of the Radcliffe Line formed up the subdivision of East Punjab, which included Patiala and East Punjab States Union, Chief Commissioner's Province of Himachal Pradesh, and Bilaspur State. The states that make up this region in the contemporary era are Punjab, Haryana, Himachal Pradesh, and the Union Territory of Chandigarh.)
1. Hinduism (64.6%)
2. Sikhism (32.8%)
3. Islam (1.77%)
4. Christianity (0.58%)
5. Jainism (0.27%)
6. Others (0.02%)

After Partition, East Punjab underwent significant restructuring, particularly in its Punjab States Agency. Several princely states in the region were merged in 1948 to form the Patiala and East Punjab States Union (PEPSU), while a number of hill states in the north were integrated to form Himachal Pradesh. Bilaspur Princely state remained a separate entity as Bilaspur State. In the 1951 census, these regions — Punjab, PEPSU, Himachal Pradesh, Bilaspur, and Delhi — were grouped together in a single volume titled Census of India, 1951: Punjab, Pepsu, Himachal Pradesh, Bilaspur & Delhi. Although Delhi was included in this volume, it had become a separate province in 1911 and is not considered part of East Punjab for statistical purposes. Below is the religious demographics of this region broken down by district with an overall total as per the 1951 census of India.

In the following tables, 268,602 people from the Jullundur Division were not classified by religion due to missing records caused by a fire in the Jullundur Census Tabulation Office. As a result, their religious affiliation could not be included at the district level. These unclassified populations were distributed across Amritsar district (96,720 persons), Gurdaspur district (89,512 persons), Jullundur district (46,834 persons), Ferozepur district (18,283 persons), Kangra district (9,565 persons), Hoshiarpur district (6,362 persons), and Ludhiana district (1,326 persons). While their district level religious details were omitted, the number was included on the overall provincial tabulation. According to consolidated data, out of the 268,602 individuals, 117,186 persons were Hindus and others, 149,758 persons were Sikhs, and 1,658 persons were Muslims. Therefore, the actual total population of the province/state was not 16,975,754 as shown in the tables below, but 17,244,356 after including these 268,602 individuals.

Religion in the Districts of East Punjab, India region (1951)
District	Hinduism		Sikhism		Islam		Christianity		Jainism		Others		Total responses		Total population	
District	Pop.	%	Pop.	%	Pop.	%	Pop.	%	Pop.	%	Pop.	%	Pop.	%	Pop.	%
Firozpur district	505,937	38.67%	780,024	59.62%	4,805	0.37%	11,976	0.92%	5,475	0.42%	20	0%	1,308,237	98.62%	1,326,520	100%
Amritsar district	351,710	27.69%	897,309	70.64%	4,237	0.33%	14,753	1.16%	2,115	0.17%	196	0.02%	1,270,320	92.92%	1,367,040	100%
Rohtak district	1,105,046	98.48%	7,907	0.7%	2,562	0.23%	153	0.01%	5,878	0.52%	500	0.04%	1,122,046	100%	1,122,046	100%
Hoshiarpur district	794,688	73.2%	283,720	26.13%	1,353	0.12%	4,027	0.37%	1,823	0.17%	13	0%	1,085,624	99.42%	1,091,986	100%
Karnal district	974,959	90.33%	96,458	8.94%	3,658	0.34%	490	0.05%	3,813	0.35%	1	0%	1,079,379	100%	1,079,379	100%
Hissar district	954,714	91.3%	80,394	7.69%	3,312	0.32%	609	0.06%	6,609	0.63%	7	0%	1,045,645	100%	1,045,645	100%
Jalandhar district	429,747	42.6%	569,487	56.45%	2,569	0.25%	5,969	0.59%	985	0.1%	9	0%	1,008,766	95.56%	1,055,600	100%
Gurgaon district	794,019	82.06%	6,310	0.65%	163,663	16.91%	769	0.08%	2,722	0.28%	181	0.02%	967,664	100%	967,664	100%
Ambala district	681,477	72.21%	232,456	24.63%	23,106	2.45%	3,690	0.39%	2,983	0.32%	22	0%	943,734	100%	943,734	100%
Kangra district	898,564	96.99%	18,401	1.99%	6,426	0.69%	604	0.07%	1,199	0.13%	1,283	0.14%	926,477	98.98%	936,042	100%
Ludhiana district	301,398	37.36%	497,419	61.65%	3,360	0.42%	1,200	0.15%	3,397	0.42%	5	0%	806,779	99.84%	808,105	100%
Gurdaspur district	346,884	45.54%	354,681	46.56%	9,370	1.23%	50,457	6.62%	388	0.05%	2	0%	761,782	89.49%	851,294	100%
Bhatinda district	144,305	21.64%	521,045	78.14%	416	0.06%	450	0.07%	574	0.09%	19	0%	666,809	100%	666,809	100%
Sangrur district	420,218	65.36%	215,023	33.44%	3,741	0.58%	341	0.05%	3,610	0.56%	1	0%	642,934	100%	642,934	100%
Barnala district	112,635	20.99%	380,811	70.95%	41,673	7.76%	113	0.02%	1,484	0.28%	12	0%	536,728	100%	536,728	100%
Patiala district	273,087	52.09%	246,953	47.1%	2,893	0.55%	499	0.1%	689	0.13%	148	0.03%	524,269	100%	524,269	100%
Mohinder Garh district	438,347	98.93%	2,615	0.59%	1,450	0.33%	5	0%	657	0.15%	0	0%	443,074	100%	443,074	100%
Mahasu district	327,998	99.21%	730	0.22%	1,795	0.54%	85	0.03%	4	0%	2	0%	330,614	100%	330,614	100%
Mandi district	308,302	99.25%	1,056	0.34%	1,268	0.41%	0	0%	0	0%	0	0%	310,626	100%	310,626	100%
Kapurthala district	104,679	35.48%	187,568	63.57%	854	0.29%	1,547	0.52%	269	0.09%	154	0.05%	295,071	100%	295,071	100%
Fatehgarh Sahib district	80,141	33.76%	154,714	65.17%	2,269	0.96%	267	0.11%	6	0%	0	0%	237,397	100%	237,397	100%
Chamba district	170,333	96.75%	300	0.17%	5,208	2.96%	208	0.12%	1	0%	0	0%	176,050	100%	176,050	100%
Sirmoor district	157,815	95.03%	2,626	1.58%	5,588	3.36%	19	0.01%	29	0.02%	0	0%	166,077	100%	166,077	100%
Kohistan district	130,937	88.83%	13,206	8.96%	2,617	1.78%	343	0.23%	289	0.2%	11	0.01%	147,403	100%	147,403	100%
Bilaspur district	124,393	98.65%	307	0.24%	1,394	1.11%	5	0%	0	0%	0	0%	126,099	100%	126,099	100%
Simla district	37,287	80.8%	7,417	16.07%	659	1.43%	596	1.29%	131	0.28%	60	0.13%	46,150	100%	46,150	100%
Total responses	10,969,620	64.62%	5,558,937	32.75%	300,246	1.77%	99,175	0.58%	45,130	0.27%	2,646	0.02%	16,975,754	98.44%	—N/a	—N/a
Total population	—N/a	—N/a	—N/a	—N/a	—N/a	—N/a	—N/a	—N/a	—N/a	—N/a	—N/a	—N/a	—N/a	—N/a	17,244,356	100%
Note: Territory comprises the contemporary subdivisions of Punjab, India, Chandigarh, Haryana, and Himachal Pradesh.

=== 1961 census ===
Religions in East Punjab, India region (1961) (Note: Immediately following the partition of India in 1947, districts and Princely states that ultimately fell on the eastern side of the Radcliffe Line formed the subdivision of East Punjab, which included Patiala and East Punjab States Union, Chief Commissioner's Province of Himachal Pradesh, and Bilaspur State. The states that make up this region in the contemporary era are Punjab, Haryana, Himachal Pradesh, and the Union Territory of Chandigarh.)
1. Hinduism (65.8%)
2. Sikhism (31.3%)
3. Islam (1.93%)
4. Christianity (0.69%)
5. Jainism (0.23%)
6. Others (0.10%)

The 1961 Census data reflects the post-reorganization administrative boundaries. By this time, the Patiala and East Punjab States Union (PEPSU) had been fully merged into Punjab on 1 November 1956 under the States Reorganisation Act. Additionally, the former princely state of Bilaspur, a Part-C state, was merged into Himachal Pradesh in 1954. Therefore, the 1961 census tables include populations from the territories of both Punjab (including the former PEPSU regions) and Himachal Pradesh (including Bilaspur), as per their reorganized state boundaries.

The religious demography of the East Punjab region including the contemporary subdivisions of Punjab, Haryana, Himachal Pradesh, and the Union Territory of Chandigarh is broken down below by district with an overall total as per the 1961 census of India.

Religion in the Districts of East Punjab, India region (1961)
District	Hinduism		Sikhism		Islam		Christianity		Jainism		Others		Total	
District	Pop.	%	Pop.	%	Pop.	%	Pop.	%	Pop.	%	Pop.	%	Pop.	%
Firozpur district	657,712	40.62%	936,953	57.87%	3,369	0.21%	19,234	1.19%	1,746	0.11%	102	0.01%	1,619,116	100%
Hissar district	1,374,258	89.21%	152,719	9.91%	6,203	0.4%	1,022	0.07%	6,021	0.39%	285	0.02%	1,540,508	100%
Amritsar district	506,170	32.98%	990,344	64.52%	2,401	0.16%	33,739	2.2%	1,987	0.13%	275	0.02%	1,534,916	100%
Karnal district	1,293,354	86.78%	177,602	11.92%	14,159	0.95%	2,094	0.14%	3,207	0.22%	14	0%	1,490,430	100%
Sangrur district	738,816	51.86%	622,227	43.67%	55,738	3.91%	577	0.04%	7,328	0.51%	2	0%	1,424,688	100%
Rohtak district	1,400,347	98.59%	6,439	0.45%	7,349	0.52%	355	0.02%	5,471	0.39%	430	0.03%	1,420,391	100%
Ambala district	981,288	71.45%	340,968	24.83%	40,351	2.94%	4,877	0.36%	5,318	0.39%	675	0.05%	1,373,477	100%
Gurgaon district	1,011,862	81.56%	8,362	0.67%	216,767	17.47%	730	0.06%	2,930	0.24%	55	0%	1,240,706	100%
Hoshiarpur district	835,436	67.73%	381,965	30.97%	7,050	0.57%	7,207	0.58%	1,794	0.15%	41	0%	1,233,493	100%
Jalandhar district	662,631	53.99%	550,232	44.83%	3,184	0.26%	8,733	0.71%	2,278	0.19%	309	0.03%	1,227,367	100%
Kangra district	1,043,387	98.2%	8,854	0.83%	6,701	0.63%	1,251	0.12%	127	0.01%	2,198	0.21%	1,062,518	100%
Bhatinda district	285,967	27.1%	762,677	72.28%	3,340	0.32%	956	0.09%	2,209	0.21%	28	0%	1,055,177	100%
Patiala district	480,086	45.78%	553,438	52.77%	11,714	1.12%	1,565	0.15%	1,944	0.19%	31	0%	1,048,778	100%
Ludhiana district	365,429	35.74%	644,266	63.01%	4,686	0.46%	2,638	0.26%	5,110	0.5%	390	0.04%	1,022,519	100%
Gurdaspur district	494,635	50.06%	424,190	42.93%	5,566	0.56%	62,231	6.3%	69	0.01%	1,303	0.13%	987,994	100%
Mahendragarh district	543,480	99.2%	2,222	0.41%	1,456	0.27%	29	0.01%	663	0.12%	0	0%	547,850	100%
Mandi district	380,453	99.01%	1,759	0.46%	1,868	0.49%	28	0.01%	10	0%	141	0.04%	384,259	100%
Mahasu district	354,247	98.68%	793	0.22%	2,958	0.82%	203	0.06%	9	0%	759	0.21%	358,969	100%
Kapurthala district	140,828	40.96%	200,117	58.21%	856	0.25%	1,535	0.45%	416	0.12%	26	0.01%	343,778	100%
Chamba district	197,821	93.94%	398	0.19%	10,512	4.99%	105	0.05%	10	0%	1,733	0.82%	210,579	100%
Sirmur district	185,020	93.66%	3,867	1.96%	8,203	4.15%	221	0.11%	64	0.03%	176	0.09%	197,551	100%
Bilaspur district	155,094	97.66%	1,593	1%	2,078	1.31%	35	0.02%	2	0%	4	0%	158,806	100%
Simla district	104,784	93.01%	5,392	4.79%	1,214	1.08%	1,059	0.94%	135	0.12%	69	0.06%	112,653	100%
Kinnaur district	37,384	91.22%	27	0.07%	0	0%	0	0%	0	0%	3,569	8.71%	40,980	100%
Lahaul and Spiti district	9,575	46.81%	162	0.79%	1,210	5.92%	2	0.01%	1	0%	9,503	46.46%	20,453	100%
Total	14,240,064	65.75%	6,777,566	31.29%	418,933	1.93%	150,426	0.69%	48,849	0.23%	22,118	0.1%	21,657,956	100%
Note: Territory comprises the contemporary subdivisions of Punjab, India, Chandigarh, Haryana, and Himachal Pradesh.

=== 1971 census ===
Religions in East Punjab, India region (1971) (Note: Immediately following the partition of India in 1947, districts and Princely states that ultimately fell on the eastern side of the Radcliffe Line formed the subdivision of East Punjab, which included Patiala and East Punjab States Union, Chief Commissioner's Province of Himachal Pradesh, and Bilaspur State. The states that make up this region in the contemporary era are Punjab, Haryana, Himachal Pradesh, and the Union Territory of Chandigarh.)
1. Hinduism (64.3%)
2. Sikhism (32.6%)
3. Islam (2.10%)
4. Christianity (0.65%)
5. Jainism (0.20%)
6. Others (0.17%)

By the time of the 1971 Census, the administrative boundaries of the region had changed significantly following the Punjab Reorganisation Act of 1966, which came into effect on 1 November 1966. Under this Act, the state of Haryana was created out of the southeastern portion of Punjab, and several hilly regions were transferred to Himachal Pradesh. Additionally, an area comprising the city of Chandigarh Capital Project, Manimajra and 36 villages from Kharar Tehsil was separated from Punjab to form the Union Territory of Chandigarh. The 1971 Census was conducted according to the same administrative boundaries that exist today for Punjab, Haryana, Himachal Pradesh, and Chandigarh Union Territory.

The religious demography of the East Punjab region including the contemporary states of Punjab, Haryana, Himachal Pradesh, and the Union Territory of Chandigarh is broken down below by district with an overall total as per the 1971 census of India.

Religion in the Districts of East Punjab, India region (1971)
District	Hinduism		Sikhism		Islam		Christianity		Jainism		Others		Total	
District	Pop.	%	Pop.	%	Pop.	%	Pop.	%	Pop.	%	Pop.	%	Pop.	%
Hisar district	1,893,125	88.76%	218,854	10.26%	12,211	0.57%	1,732	0.08%	6,239	0.29%	787	0.04%	2,132,948	100%
Karnal district	1,714,103	86.51%	232,237	11.72%	27,523	1.39%	2,693	0.14%	4,112	0.21%	635	0.03%	1,981,303	100%
Firozpur district	639,911	33.58%	1,240,218	65.07%	6,340	0.33%	16,158	0.85%	1,084	0.06%	2,122	0.11%	1,905,833	100%
Amritsar district	430,019	23.43%	1,362,291	74.22%	3,044	0.17%	37,703	2.05%	2,295	0.13%	148	0.01%	1,835,500	100%
Rohtak district	1,758,569	98.49%	7,591	0.43%	11,053	0.62%	432	0.02%	7,565	0.42%	324	0.02%	1,785,534	100%
Gurgaon district	1,387,102	81.24%	15,889	0.93%	298,499	17.48%	1,799	0.11%	3,704	0.22%	376	0.02%	1,707,369	100%
Jalandhar district	784,048	53.9%	653,018	44.9%	3,362	0.23%	10,705	0.74%	2,660	0.18%	708	0.05%	1,454,501	100%
Ludhiana district	471,519	33.22%	932,712	65.71%	5,620	0.4%	3,027	0.21%	6,176	0.44%	367	0.03%	1,419,421	100%
Kangra district	1,292,152	97.36%	19,238	1.45%	11,787	0.89%	787	0.06%	185	0.01%	3,062	0.23%	1,327,211	100%
Bhatinda district	297,382	22.56%	1,014,091	76.93%	3,829	0.29%	752	0.06%	2,072	0.16%	8	0%	1,318,134	100%
Gurdaspur district	590,290	48.02%	550,996	44.82%	6,868	0.56%	79,732	6.49%	152	0.01%	1,211	0.1%	1,229,249	100%
Patiala district	539,128	44.37%	659,020	54.24%	13,644	1.12%	1,696	0.14%	1,380	0.11%	232	0.02%	1,215,100	100%
Sangrur district	311,197	27.14%	767,071	66.9%	64,448	5.62%	806	0.07%	2,982	0.26%	146	0.01%	1,146,650	100%
Ambala district	907,075	82.58%	138,018	12.57%	45,407	4.13%	3,051	0.28%	4,541	0.41%	313	0.03%	1,098,405	100%
Hoshiarpur district	623,413	59.25%	414,323	39.38%	3,456	0.33%	8,594	0.82%	1,602	0.15%	765	0.07%	1,052,153	100%
Mahendragarh district	684,763	99.01%	2,462	0.36%	3,380	0.49%	17	0%	782	0.11%	235	0.03%	691,639	100%
Jind district	611,573	95.62%	15,997	2.5%	7,650	1.2%	78	0.01%	4,230	0.66%	82	0.01%	639,610	100%
Rupar district	237,016	43.49%	303,102	55.61%	2,978	0.55%	1,212	0.22%	655	0.12%	42	0.01%	545,005	100%
Mandi district	505,476	98.12%	5,692	1.1%	3,132	0.61%	131	0.03%	26	0.01%	723	0.14%	515,180	100%
Mahasu district	434,625	98.75%	1,547	0.35%	2,927	0.67%	272	0.06%	27	0.01%	720	0.16%	440,118	100%
Kapurthala district	163,312	38.02%	263,130	61.26%	858	0.2%	1,817	0.42%	325	0.08%	72	0.02%	429,514	100%
Chandigarh Union Territory	184,395	71.68%	65,472	25.45%	3,720	1.45%	2,504	0.97%	1,016	0.39%	144	0.06%	257,251	100%
Chamba district	237,104	92.9%	878	0.34%	14,207	5.57%	505	0.2%	0	0%	2,539	0.99%	255,233	100%
Sirmaur district	226,905	92.6%	5,350	2.18%	10,938	4.46%	391	0.16%	130	0.05%	1,319	0.54%	245,033	100%
Simla district	200,658	92.41%	9,744	4.49%	4,349	2%	970	0.45%	221	0.1%	1,187	0.55%	217,129	100%
Bilaspur district	190,877	97.99%	1,333	0.68%	2,523	1.3%	32	0.02%	12	0.01%	9	0%	194,786	100%
Kulu district	185,523	96.44%	832	0.43%	409	0.21%	334	0.17%	17	0.01%	5,256	2.73%	192,371	100%
Kinnaur district	42,486	85.25%	193	0.39%	28	0.06%	35	0.07%	7	0.01%	7,086	14.22%	49,835	100%
Lahul and Spiti district	8,821	37.48%	107	0.45%	27	0.11%	99	0.42%	1	0%	14,483	61.53%	23,538	100%
Total	17,552,567	64.28%	8,901,406	32.6%	574,217	2.1%	178,064	0.65%	54,198	0.2%	45,101	0.17%	27,305,553	100%
Note: Territory comprises the contemporary subdivisions of Punjab, India, Chandigarh, Haryana, and Himachal Pradesh.

=== 2011 census ===
==== Religion ====
Religion in East Punjab (2011)
1. Hinduism (65.9%)
2. Sikhism (28.6%)
3. Islam (4.13%)
4. Others (1.30%)

East Punjab comprising the states of (Punjab, Haryana, Himachal Pradesh and Union territory of Chandigarh) had a population of 61,014,852 people as of 2011 census report of India. The Hindus form a majority in East Punjab region with 40,234,605 adherents comprising (65.94%), Sikhs are 17,466,731 comprising (28.62%) of the region, Muslims are 2,518,159 comprising (4.12%) of the region and others are 795,357 including Christians, Buddhists, Jains, and atheists together comprising remaining (1.3%) of the region.

Sikhs are the majority in Punjab, while Hindus form the majority in Haryana, Himachal Pradesh, and Chandigarh. Muslims survived in districts of Malerkotla and Nuh. Christians have dominance in Punjab while Bhuddhist dominate Lahaul and Spiti district of Himachal Pradesh.

==== Language ====
Languages spoken in East Punjab (2011)
1. Punjabi (46.2%)
2. Hindi (26.6%)
3. Haryanvi (15.4%)
4. Pahari languages (7.53%)
5. Others (4.23%)

As per 2011 census, Punjabi is the most spoken language and is spoken by 28,166,306 people, followed by Hindi which is spoken by 16,259,205 people, Haryanvi by 9,423,138 people and Western Pahari language by 4,599,283 people. While 2,580,928 people speaks other languages like Nepali.

== Modern usage ==
Since it ceased to be the name of a state, "East Punjab" has been used in India to refer to the eastern part of the present Punjab state, while in Pakistan it means the eastern part of Pakistan's Punjab province, although Pakistanis also sometimes refer to the current Indian Punjab as "East Punjab". Terms East and West Punjab are also often used in modern India and Pakistan when making a comparison between the two territories.

== See also ==
- History of Punjab
- West Punjab
- Punjab region
