= Anand Chand =

- KCIE; His Highness

44th Raja of Bilaspur
- Reign: 9 January 1933 – 12 October 1983
- Predecessor: Bijai Chand
- Successor: Gopal Chand
- Born: 26 January 1913; Bilaspur, Bilaspur State (in present-day Himachal Pradesh, India)
- Died: 12 October 1983 (aged 70); London, England, United Kingdom
- Spouses: Umawati Kumari: Sudarshana Kumari
- House: Chandel
- Father: Bijai Chand
- Mother: Suraj Devi

Member of the Rajya Sabha
- In office 1965–1970
- Constituency: Bihar
- In office 1958–1964
- Constituency: Himachal Pradesh

Member of the Lok Sabha
- In office 1952–1957
- Constituency: Bilaspur

Chief Commissioner of Bilaspur
- In office 12 October 1948 – 26 January 1950
- Preceded by: Post established
- Succeeded by: Himmatsinhji

His Highness Raja Sir Anand Chand KCIE (26 January 1913 – 12 October 1983) was the 44th Raja of Bilaspur. He was a Member of Parliament, representing Bihar in the Rajya Sabha, the upper house of India's Parliament as a member of the Indian National Congress.

== Biography ==
Anand Chand was born on 26 January 1913 to Raja Bijai Chand (1873–1931), of the Rajput clan of Chandel, and Suraj Devi (1886–1939) in Bilaspur, an erstwhile princely state. He studied at the Mayo College in Ajmer, before heading to Delhi to engage in civil and judicial training that preceded him being invested with full ruling powers of Bilaspur, 9 January 1933. While the Raja, he abolished begar (heavy labour) in 1936, also passing a legislation abolishing child marriage.

Gandhiji’s ideas on Panchayati Raj were followed. In 1938, Education and Health Committees (Panchayats) were elected in all parganas on the basis of adult franchise. A representative Constitutional Advisory Committee was formed. The Committee prepared a constitution on the most egalitarian principles. It provided for a decentralised state on the principle that local issues must be resolved locally.

In the middle of the year 1939 Raja Anand Chand separated judiciary from executive making Bilaspur State one of the first states in India to do so. Before 1934 Courts of the State were governed by an established code and procedure. After retirement of Diwan in the year 1934, the post of revenue and judicial secretary had been created which also became the joint head of the Revenue and Judicial Department and also supervised a number of other departments. The Court of Collector and District Magistrate was temporarily suspended but was revived in 1935.

In 1942, he introduced the Bilaspur Prohibition Act. Schools, health centres, and roads linking Suket and Mandi to Delhi were constructed during his reign. In recognition of the role he played during World War II, Chand was awarded the George Cross, Victoria Cross and in 1945, the KCIE.

Between 1947 and 1948, Chand became a member of the Constituent Assembly of India that was established to draft a constitution for India. In October 1948, he was appointed the chief commissioner of the hitherto Bilaspur Province of independent India, a position that he held until 1950, when it became a State, before merging with what is today the State of Himachal Pradesh. Chand was elected to the 1st Lok Sabha from Bilaspur.

He was later elected to the Rajya Sabha, first from Himachal Pradesh (1958–1964) and then from Bihar (1965–1970). In 1976, Chand moved to London, England, with his family after government-given privileges and allowances to princely states were abolished in 1971. Chand was elected to the Himachal Pradesh Legislative Assembly in 1977 and would travel to Bilaspur and Shimla while the legislature was in session.

== Death ==
He remained a member until his term ended in 1982, a year in which he also suffered a stroke. He died on 12 October 1983 in London, and was cremated at the banks of the Sutlej River.

== Family ==
Anand Chand first married Umawati Devi (1916–1961), the daughter of Raja Rana Bhagat Singh of Jubbal, in May 1931. They had two sons and two daughters together:

1. Rajendra Chand (1935–1971)
2. Ambika Devi (1933–1981)
3. Rajeshwari Devi (1937–2004)
4. Kirti Chand (1941–2013)

Following Umawati Devi's death, he married Sudarshana Kumari (b. 1940), the daughter of Mr. Mehar Aggarwal resident of Bhojpur Mohala Sundernagar in District Mandi, in 1969. They had two children, a son and a daughter:

1. Gopal Chand (b. 1969).
2. Sunanda Chand (b. 1973)
