= Bilaspur State (1950–1954) =

- Former state 1950–1954
- Etymology: from a Fisher-woman named “Bilasa”
- Location of Bilaspur State in India
- Coordinates: 31.33°N 76.75°E
- Country: India
- Region: North India
- Previously was: Kahlur
- Formation: 1950
- Consolidation: 1954
- Capital and largest city: Bilaspur, Himachal Pradesh

Government

Area
  - Total: 1,401 km^{2} (541 sq mi)

Population (1951)
  - Total: 126,099
- Time zone: UTC+05:30 (IST)
Preceded by	Succeeded by
Kahlur	Himachal Pradesh

Bilaspur State was a state of India from 1950 to 1954 with Bilaspur town as its capital. The state was established after the province of the same name created in 1948 from the princely state of Bilaspur.

The 31st state of Bilaspur, which had been until then a separate entity under the control of the Chief Commissioner, was integrated with Himachal Pradesh on 1 July 1954 thereby adding one more district to the state.

The main reason why Bilaspur was made a separate state, instead of being merged with Himachal Pradesh from the beginning, was because of the ongoing construction of the Bhakra Dam in the area. This was expected to cause extensive flooding that would displace a lot of people, who would then need to receive compensation as well as be relocated. The central government wanted to have Bilaspur as a separate state so that they could deal with these matters separately instead of being subsumed under Himachal Pradesh.

== History ==
Bilaspur State was formed out of the territory of former Princely State of Bilaspur, which became part of the Dominion of India on 12 October 1948 by the accession of its erstwhile Ruler, Raja Anand Chand of the Princely State of Kahlur a.k.a. Bilaspur.

Bilaspur was a Province, until it was established as a Class "C" State, named Bilaspur State on 26 January 1950 within the Republic of India. Class "C" States were under the direct rule of the Central Government.

=== Disestablishment ===
After The Himachal Pradesh and Bilaspur (New State) Act, 1954 was passed by an act of Parliament, the state was dissolved on 1 July 1954, and incorporated as Bilaspur district of Himachal Pradesh.

Himachal Pradesh state was another part-C state. Initially it had a 36-member Legislative Assembly and the first elections to the Assembly had been held in 1952. In 1954, when Bilaspur was merged with Himachal Pradesh, the strength of its Assembly was raised to 41.

== Chief Commissioners ==
1. Raja Anand Chand from October 1948 to April 1949.
2. Shrichand Chhabra, from April 1949 to November 1953
3. K. S. Himmatsinhji, from November 1953 to July 1954

== See also ==
- Political integration of India
- States Reorganisation Act
