= Dujana =

Dujana is a village, formerly a princely state, in Beri tehsil of Jhajjar district of Haryana State, India. The village is administered by a Sarpanch, an elected representative of the village.

== History ==
Dujana Princely State existed since the time of Mughals. During the first war of independence in 1857, Nawab Hasan Ali of Dujana played a key role.

== Demography ==
As of 2011, the village has a total number of 1547 houses and the population of 7715 of which include 4070 are males while 3645 are females.

Religious groups in Dujana State (British Punjab province era)
Religious group	1881		1891		1901		1911		1921		1931		1941	
Religious group	Pop.	%	Pop.	%	Pop.	%	Pop.	%	Pop.	%	Pop.	%	Pop.	%
Hinduism (Note: 1931-1941: Including Ad-Dharmis)	18,102	77.31%	20,491	77.47%	18,380	76.03%	20,161	79.11%	20,135	77.94%	22,347	79.2%	23,727	77.37%
Islam	5,314	22.69%	5,959	22.53%	5,790	23.95%	5,324	20.89%	5,698	22.06%	5,863	20.78%	6,939	22.63%
Sikhism	0	0%	0	0%	4	0.02%	0	0%	0	0%	1	0%	0	0%
Christianity	0	0%	0	0%	0	0%	0	0%	0	0%	5	0.02%	0	0%
Jainism	0	0%	0	0%	0	0%	0	0%	0	0%	0	0%	0	0%
Zoroastrianism	0	0%	0	0%	0	0%	0	0%	0	0%	0	0%	0	0%
Buddhism	0	0%	0	0%	0	0%	0	0%	0	0%	0	0%	0	0%
Judaism	—N/a	—N/a	0	0%	0	0%	0	0%	0	0%	0	0%	0	0%
Others	0	0%	0	0%	0	0%	0	0%	0	0%	0	0%	0	0%
Total population	23,416	100%	26,450	100%	24,174	100%	25,485	100%	25,833	100%	28,216	100%	30,666	100%
Note: British Punjab province era district borders are not an exact match in the present-day due to various bifurcations to district borders — which since created new districts — throughout the historic Punjab Province region during the post-independence era that have taken into account population increases.
