= History of Himachal Pradesh =

Himachal Pradesh was established in 1948 as a Chief Commissioner's Province within the Union of India. The province comprised the hill districts around Shimla and the southern hill areas of the former Punjab region. Himachal became a part C state on 1951 with the implementation of the Constitution of India. Himachal Pradesh became a Union Territory on 1 November 1956. On 18 December 1970, the State of Himachal Pradesh Act was passed by Parliament, and the new state came into being on 25 January 1971. Thus, Himachal emerged as the eighteenth state of the Indian Union.

In earlier times, the area was variously divided among smaller kingdoms, such as those of Chamba, Bilaspur, Bhagal and Dhami. After the Gurkha War of 1815–1816, it became part of the British India.

== Pre-Independence ==
=== Medieval history ===
In about 883 AD Shankar Verma, the ruler of Kashmir exercised his influence over Himachal Pradesh. The region also witnessed the invasion of Mahmud Ghazni in 1009 AD, who during that period he looted the wealth from the temples in the North India. In 1043 AD the Rajputs ruled over the territory.

The small kingdom had enjoyed a large degree of independence till the eve of the Muslim invasions in northern India. The states of the foothills were devastated by Muslim invaders a number of times. Mahmud Ghazni conquered Kangra at the beginning of the 11th century. Timur and Sikander Lodi also marched through the lower hills of the state and captured a number of forts and fought many battles.

=== Katoch era ===
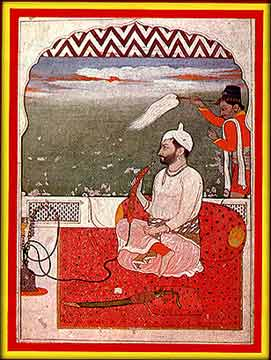
Sansar Chand (c. 1765–1823)

In 1773 AD the Rajputs under Katoch Maharaja Sansar Chand possessed the region, until the attack by Maharaja Ranjit Singh in 1804 which crushed the Rajput power.

The Gorkha Kingdom came to power in Nepal in 1768 to the east of Kangra. They consolidated their military power and began to expand into the territory between them and Kangra, annexing Sirmour and Shimla. Under the leadership of General Amar Singh Thapa, the Gorkhas laid siege to Kangra, and in 1806 defeated Sansar Chand, the Katoch ruler of Kangra.

To the west of Kangra, the Sikh Empire rose in 1799, also expanding towards Kangra. At the same time as the Gorkhas were invading Kangra from the east, the Sikhs were invading from the west. After the 1806 defeated of Katoch ruler Sansar Chand by the Gorkha, the Sikh Maharaja Ranjit Singh allied with the Katochs, and the combined armies pushed out the Gorkhas in 1809.

=== British period ===
This led to the Anglo-Gorkha war. They came into direct conflict with the British along the tarai belt after which the British expelled them from the provinces of the Satluj. Thus British gradually emerged as the paramount powers. In early 19th century the British annexed the areas of Shimla after the Gurkha War of 1815–16. Himachal became a centrally administered territory in 1948 with the integration of 31 hill provinces and received additional regions in 1966.

The revolt of 1857 or the first Indian war of independence resulted due to the building up of political, social, economic, religious and military grievances against the British government. People of the hill states were not politically alive as the people in other parts of the country. They remained more or less inactive and so did their rulers with the exception of Bushahr.

Some of them even rendered help to the British government during the revolt. Among them were the rulers of Chamba, Bilaspur, Bhagal and Dhami. The rulers of Bushars rather acted in a manner hostile to the interests of British.

The British territories in the hill came under British Crown after Queen Victoria's proclamation of 1858. The states of Chamba, Mandi and Bilaspur made good progress in many fields during the British rule. During World War I, virtually all rulers of the hill states remained loyal and contributed to the British war effort both in the form of men and materials. Amongst these were the states of Kangra, Nurpur, Chamba, Suket, Mandi and Bilaspur

== Post independence ==
After independence the Chief Commissioner's province of H.P. came into being on 15 April 1948. Himachal became a part C state on 26 January 1950 with the implementation of the Constitution of India. Himachal Pradesh became Union Territory on 1 November 1956. On 18 December 1970 the State of Himachal Pradesh Act was passed by Parliament and the new state came into being on 25 January 1971. Thus H.P. emerged as the eighteenth state of Indian Union.
