= Demographics of Punjab =

Articles with relevant content include:

- Punjab § People
- Demographics of Punjab, India
- Punjab, Pakistan § Demographics
