= Mohal Khera =

Village in India

Coordinates: 29°37′N 76°08′E

Mohal Khera or Mohalkhera is a village in Narwana tehsil in Jind district in the Indian state of Haryana. is a village in the Narwana tehsil of Jind district in the Indian state of Haryana. The village was established by people of the Damara gotra, from the nearby village of Ghaso. Families of the Kundu, Chahal, and Beniwal gotras later settled in the area. This village was primarily settled by the descendants of Numberdar Amilal Damara, and it gradually expanded through collective settlement. The community plays a main role in local politics and as major landholders. Many residents are employed in the defence services and in the teaching profession ,HCS , Assistant Professor and Many People serving to country through their service and efforts.
