= Frain Kalan =

Coordinates: 29.593°N 76.033°E

Frain Kalan is a village in the mandal of Narwana, in Jind district in the Indian state of Haryana.
