= Women in Punjab, India =

Demographic group in India

Women in Punjab can also be known as Punjabans or Punjabi women. They are the female inhabitants of state of Punjab in India. They belong to diverse economic, social, cultural and caste backgrounds, but their residence in a common state gives them a shared identity. Women have made significant progress in Punjab but they still remain underrepresented in various fields due to the patriarchal structure still remaining intact in Punjabi society.

== History ==
During the rule of Maharaja Ranjit Singh, schools for girls were also opened in many places. In 1870, to stop female infanticides, the British government passed a legislative act called Female Infanticide Prevention Act, 1870. This act banned the murder of female infants in Punjab and some other provinces. Names of some of the women from Punjab who participated in the freedom struggle of India are Rajkumari Amrit Kaur, Gulab Kaur, Adarsh Kumari, Kishan Kaur, Amar Kaur, Dalip Kaur, Shushila Devi, Har Devi, Purani and Pushpa Gujral.

On 17 June 1956, Hindu Succession Act came into force. It gave the women right to inherit property.

In 1993 and 1994, the 73rd and 74th Amendment Acts were passed that reserved one-third of seats in Panchayati Raj Institution (PRI) for women. These acts were passed to ensure equal participation for women. Rajinder Kaur Bhattal served as the first female Chief Minister of Punjab from November 1996 to February 1997. She took office after the resignation of Harcharan Singh Brar. She was the eighth female Chief Minister in Indian history.

On 14 October 2020, Punjab government passed ‘Punjab Civil Services (Reservation of Posts for Women) Rules, 2020’. This gave 33% reservation to women in direct recruitment to posts in state government, boards and corporations.

In April 2024, Panjab University in Chandigarh became the first university associated with Punjab government to grant menstrual leave to female students, starting from the session 2024–25. The policy will allow leave of one day per one calendar month of teaching and maximum of four days leave per semester.

== Demographics ==
As of 2011 census, women constitute 47.23% of total population of Punjab, as compared to 48.5% at the national level. In the same year, the sex ratio of Punjab was 895, which was lower than the national average of 943. As of 2011, the child sex ratio of children between the ages of 0 and 6 years was 846, which was lower than the national average of 914.

The table below shows the sex ratio of Punjab through the years.

Decadal sex ratio of Punjab by census years
Year (Census)	Sex Ratio
2011	895
2001	876
1991	882
1981	879
1971	865
1961	854
1951	844
1941	836
1931	815
1921	799
1911	870
1901	832

As of 2011, among the different districts of Punjab, the sex ratio was highest in Hoshiarpur at 961 and lowest in Bathinda at 868. The table below shows the sex ratio of Punjab by district, according to the 2011 census.

Sex ratio of Punjab by district, 2011 census
Sr. No.	District	Ratio
1	Hoshiarpur	961
2	SBS Nagar	954
3	Rupnagar	915
4	Jalandhar	915
5	Kapurthala	912
6	Gurdaspur	907
7	Tarn Taran	900
8	Sri Muktsar Sahib	896
9	Fazilka	894
10	Moga	893
11	Ferozepur	893
12	Patiala	891
13	Faridkot	890
14	Amritsar	889
15	Sangrur	885
16	Mansa	883
17	SAS Nagar	879
18	Barnala	876
19	Ludhiana	873
20	Fatehgarh Sahib	871
21	Pathankot	869
22	Bathinda	868
	Punjab	895

Number of urban people by gender in districts – Census 2011
District	Females (Urban)	Males (Urban)
Gurdaspur	1,68,563	1,92,059
Pathankot	1,33,923	1,64,243
Amritsar	6,23,469	7,11,142
Tarn Taran	66,748	75,047
Kapurthala	1,32,083	1,50,379
Jalandhar	5,44,750	6,16,421
SBS Nagar	60,243	75,173
Hoshiarpur	1,60,382	1,74,587
Rupnagar	84,411	93,396
SAS Nagar	2,56,342	2,88,269
Ludhiana	9,55,336	11,14,372
Ferozepur	1,32,034	1,53,433
Fazilka	1,25,093	1,41,996
Faridkot	1,01,162	1,15,889
Sri Muktsar Sahib	1,18,771	1,33,420
Moga	1,07,030	1,20,216
Bathinda	2,30,504	2,68,713
Mansa	77,056	86,548
Sangrur	2,42,589	2,73,376
Barnala	88,373	1,02,312
Patiala	3,59,558	4,03,722
Fatehgarh Sahib	84,737	1,00,745
Punjab (whole)	48,53,157	55,45,989

== Health ==
As of 2020, the percentage of deaths due to heart disease was higher in women than men, 41.8% for females compared to 32.2% for males. In the same year, the percentage of deaths due to COVID-19 was lower for women compared to men, 13.4% for males and 9.9% for females.

The table below shows the state nutrition profile of Punjab for women between the ages of 15 and 49 years.

State nutrition profile of Punjab of women below the age of 15 to 49, by years
Indicators	2019–21	2015–16	2005-6
Underweight	13%	12%	19%
Anemia (non-preg)	59%	54%	38%
Anemia (pregnant)	52%	42%	42%
Hypertension	31%	15%	NA
Diabetes	15%	NA	NA
Overweight/Obesity (BMI ≥25.0 kg/m2)	41%	31%	30%

In 2019, the female cervical cancer incidence rate in Punjab was 13 per 100,000 women in all ages. This was less than the rate of 14.75 in 1990. The female cervical cancer mortality rate was 7.14 per 100,000 women of all ages in 2019. This was lower than the rate of 9.34 in 1990.

=== Life Expectancy ===
Between 2013 and 2017, the life expectancy at birth for women in Punjab was 74 years, compared to the total of 72.4 years and 71 for males.

The table below shows the life expectancy in Punjab by gender and residence in 2013–17.

Life expectancy in Punjab by gender in 2013–17
Residence	Female	Male	Total
Rural	72.9	70.1	71.4
Urban	76.6	72.4	74.1
Total	74	71	72.4

Estimated from civil registration and vital statistics system (CRVSS) data, the table below shows the life expectancy by gender in the districts of Punjab, in 2012.

Estimated life expectancy in the districts of Punjab, in 2012, based on CRVSS data
District	Female (Years)	Male (Years)
Amritsar	69	64
Bathinda	81	71
Barnala	76	70
Faridkot	73	67
Fatehgarh Sahib	77	72
Firozpur	80	74
Gurdaspur	76	70
Hoshiarpur	75	68
Jalandhar	69	63
Kapurthala	84	74
Ludhiana	77	69
Mansa	76	69
Moga	74	70
Muktsar	66	69
Patiala	72	68
Rupnagar	75	69
SAS Nagar	76	70
Sangrur	76	70
SBS Nagar	75	64
Taran Taran	73	66

=== Childbirth ===
In 2019–21, 94.3% of the births were institutional births in Punjab, which was an increase from 90.5% in 2015–16. Of this, 53.9% were institutional births in public facility, which was up from 51.7% in 2015–16. In rural areas, the births in public facility were 57.6%, compared to 47.0% in urban areas, for year 2019–21. The percentage of home births that were conducted by a skilled health personnel was 2.6%, it was 3.0% for urban areas and 2.3% for rural areas. In 2015–16, this percentage was 4.5%. Of the total, 95.6% births were attended by a skilled health personnel, 2019–21. For urban areas, this rate was 93.7% and 96.6% for rural areas.

Of the total births in Punjab, 38.5% were delivered by caesarean section in 2019–21. This number was 24.6% in 2015–16. For private health facilities, 55.5% of the births were by caesarean section, in 2019–20, compared to 29.9% for public healthcare facilities. In 2015–16, this number was 39.7% for private and 29.9% for public health facilities. For private health facilities, the rate was 57.0% for rural areas and 53.4% for urban areas in 2019–21. For public health facilities, the rate was 29.1% in rural areas and 31.1% in urban areas, in the same year.

The table below shows the maternal mortality rate per one lakh (1,00,000) per year, through the years.

Maternal mortality rate per one lakh (1,00,000) per year, in Punjab through the years
Year	Rate
2017	122
2016	122
2015	122
2014	122
2013	141
2012	141
2011	141
2006	192

According to the National Family Health Survey of 2015–16, the percentage of women age 15–19 who have begun childbearing (teenage pregnancy) was 2.6%.

The table below shows the variation the fertility rate (children per woman) according to the education of a woman in Punjab, as of 2019–21.

Fertility rate by number of years of schooling completed by women in Punjab as of year 2019–21, NFHS-5
Years of schooling	Fertility rate
No schooling	2.5
<5 years	2.5
5–9 years	2.0
10–11 years	1.9
12 or more years	1.5

=== Reproductive Health ===
The table below shows the current use of family planning methods by currently married women between the age of 15 and 49 years, in Punjab.

Family planning methods used by women between the ages of 15 and 49 years, in Punjab
Method	Total (2019–21)	Urban (2019–21)	Rural (2019–21)	Total (2015–16)
Female sterilization	22.8%	18.0%	25.6%	37.5%
Male sterilization	0.5%	0.5%	0.4%	0.6%
IUD/PPIUD	3.1%	2.8%	3.2%	6.8%
Pill	1.5%	1.1%	1.7%	2.5%
Condom	22.2%	26.6%	19.7%	18.9%
Injectables	0.1%	0.1%	0.1%	0.1%
Any modern method	50.5%	49.4%	51.1%	66.3%
Any method	66.6%	68.4%	65.4%	75.8%
Total unmet need	9.9%	8.8%	10.5%	6.2%
Unmet need for spacing	3.7%	3.3%	3.9%	2.4%

The table below compares the reproductive health statistics women between the ages of 15 and 45 years in Punjab at the national level.

Comparison of reproductive health statistics of women between the ages of 15 and 45 years in Punjab at national level
Indicators	Punjab (2015–16)	India (2015–16)
Total Fertility Rate (TFR)	1.6	2.2
Any Method Contraception Rate (CPR)	75.8%	53.5%
Modern Contraception Rate (mCPR)	66.3%	47.8%
Total Unmet Need	6.2%	12.9%
20–24 year olds who were married before the age of 18 years	7.6%	26.8%
15–19 years olds who were already mothers or pregnant	2.6%	7.9%

=== Other ===
According to the NFHS-5 (2019–21), the percentage of women between the ages of 15 and 24 years who use hygienic methods of protection during their menstrual period in Punjab was 93.2%. This was an increase from the 2015–16 percentage of 84.4%. In the year 2019–21, the number was 95.4% for urban areas and 91.9% for rural areas.

== Education ==
According to the 2011 census, the literacy rate of women in Punjab was 70.73%, as compared to 80.44% for men and 75.84% as a whole. The median number of years of schooling completed by females in the state was 6.5 years, as compared to 7.8 for males, as of 2011.

Between 2001 and 2011, the literacy gap between men and women decreased from 11.9% to 9.7%. Among the different districts of Punjab, the literacy rate of women was highest in Hoshiarpur at 80.3% and lowest in Mansa at 55.7%.

The table below shows the difference in the literacy rate by gender in Punjab through the years.

Difference in the literacy rate by gender in Punjab through the years
Year	Female	Male	Gap	Total
2011	70.73%	80.44%	9.71%	75.84%
2001	63.55%	75.63%	12.08%	69.95%
1991	50.41%	65.66%	15.25%	58.51%
1981	34.35%	51.23%	16.88%	43.37%
1971	26.65%	42.23%	17.58%	34.12%

The table below shows the difference in the literacy rate of women in rural and urban areas in Punjab.

Difference in the female literacy rate in rural and urban areas in Punjab
Year	Rural	Urban	Gap
2011	65.70%	79.20%	13.50%
2001	57.75%	74.49%	16.74%
1991	43.85%	66.10%	22.25%
1981	27.63%	49.70%	22.07%
1971	19.88%	45.40%	25.52%
1961	11.51%	37.70%	26.19%

The table below shows the women proportion in the total enrolment at different levels of school education in Punjab by years.

Percentage of women in the total enrolment in different levels school education in Punjab
Level	2012	2010	2005
Primary	47.38%	47.36%	47.32%
Middle	44.10%	44.65%	46.85%
Secondary	43.59%	43.98%	46.33%
Senior-secondary	43.74%	55.23%	44.58%

The table below shows the literacy rate of women by district in Punjab.

Literacy rate of women in Punjab by district
District	2011	2001
Hoshiarpur	80.3%	75.3%
SAS Nagar	79.2%	72.1%
Jalandhar	78.5%	73.1%
Ludhiana	77.9%	71.9%
Rupnagar	76.4%	68.7%
FG Sahib	74.8%	68.3%
Gurdaspur	74.8%	67.1%
Kapurthala	74.6%	68.3%
SBS Nagar	73.9%	72.1%
Amritsar	72.0%	65.2%
Patiala	69.8%	62.6%
Moga	66.5%	58.5%
Faridkot	63.9%	55.0%
Barnala	63.6%	54.5%
Sangrur	62.2%	53.0%
Bathinda	61.9%	53.7%
Tarn Taran	61.9%	52.3%
Firozpur	61.7%	51.7%
Muktsar	59.2%	50.3%
Mansa	55.7%	45.2%
Punjab (whole)	70.7%	63.4%

== Politics ==
In 2022 state assembly elections, out of 117 seats 13 seats were won by women, of which 10 were first-timers. Of these 13 MLAs, 11 were from Aam Admi Party (AAP), 1 from Indian National Congress (INC) and 1 from Shiromani Akali Dal (SAD).

The table below shows the number of women in the Punjab legislative assembly by election years.

Number of women in Punjab legislative assembly by election years
Year	Female members	Female percentage
2022	8	6.83%
2017	6	5.12%
2012	14	11.96%
2007	7	5.98%
2002	8	6.83%

As of 2023, there was 2 women Members of Parliament (MP) in the Lok Sabha representing Punjab, out of the total 13 constituencies in the state. There were no women MPs representing Punjab in Rajya Sabha, out of the total of 7 representatives.

During the 2022 Punjab legislative assembly elections, 71.91% of eligible women voters voted, as compared to 71.99% of eligible male voters.

The table below shows the polling percentage in Punjab legislative assembly elections by gender.

Polling percentage in Punjab legislative assembly elections by gender
Year	Female	Male
2017	77.90%	75.88%
2012	78.90%	77.58%
2007	75.47%	75.36%
2002	64.27%	65.92%
1997	67.84%	69.51%
1992	21.59%	25.72%
1985	66.72%	68.20%
1980	62.80%	65.64%
1977	63.65%	66.82%
1972	66.64%	70.36%
1969	69.61%	74.54%
1967	68.50%	73.47%

== Economy ==
As of 2022–23, 25.2% of the women in Punjab are employed, which was an increase from the rate of 21.9% in year 2021–22. But it was lower than the national average of 36%.

As of 2011, the work participation rate of females was 13.9% in Punjab, which was lower than the rate of men at 55.15%. It was also lower than the average female work participation rate of whole India at 25.51%.

The table below shows the work participation rate by gender in Punjab, as 2011 census.

Work participation of by gender in Punjab, 2011 census
Residence	Female	Male	Gender Gap
Urban	13.2%	55.9%	42.2%
Rural	14.3%	54.9%	40.6%
Total	13.9%	55.15%	41.25%

== Crimes ==
In 2022, Punjab registered 517 rape cases, which was an increase of about 10% from the previous year, with 464 cases in 2021. However, the total number of FIRs in various crimes against women dropped slightly from 5,662 in 2021 to 5,572 in 2022. This was a drop of 90 registered cases. These cases included 1,478 for kidnapping and abduction of women and 1,640 of cruelty by husband, in 2022.

As of 2020, the overall share of women in the police force was 9.4% in Punjab, which was lower than the Indian average of 10.5%. At officer level, the share in Punjab stood at 7.1%.

According to the NFHS-5 (2019–21), percentage of women in between the ages of 20 and 24 years, who were married or in union before the age of 18 in Punjab was 9%, which was lower than the Indian average of 23%.

=== Honour Killings ===
As of 2014, Punjab has one of the highest frequency of honour killings in India. Perpetrators are mostly the family members of the victim. A study of 100 sample cases of honour killings in Punjab between 2005 and 2012, revealed that the proportion of cases in which only girl was killed was 41%, cases in which only boy was killed was 12% and the cases in which both girl and boy were killed was 47%.

According to the same study, 40% of the girls were in the age group of 15–19 years and 60% in 20–25 years. According to the study, the most common cause of the killing was inter-caste relationship at 44%, followed by relationship within the same village at 28% and family intolerant to the relationship at 28%.

In the same study, of the 100 cases the caste of the accused has been known in 87 cases, which revealed that in the 80 cases among these the accused belonged to Jat caste. By proportion, 91.75% of the accused belonged to Jat caste, 6.89% to Khatri caste and 1.14% to were Dalits.

== See also ==
- Demographics of Punjab, India
- Health in Punjab, India
- Education in Punjab, India
