= Demographics of Punjab, India =

Population Growth
Year	Pop.	±%
1901	7,679,645 (Note: 1901 figure taken from census data by combining the total population of all districts (Jalandhar, Ludhiana, Firozpur, Amritsar, Hoshiarpur, and Gurdaspur (minus Shakargarh Tehsil)), and princely states (Kapurthala, Malerkotla, Faridkot, Patiala, and Nabha) which are in the region that comprises the contemporary state of Punjab, India. See 1901 census data here:)	—
1911	6,830,507 (Note: 1911 figure taken from census data by combining the total population of all districts (Jalandhar, Ludhiana, Firozpur, Amritsar, Hoshiarpur, and Gurdaspur (minus Shakargarh Tehsil)), and princely states (Kapurthala, Malerkotla, Faridkot, Patiala, and Nabha) which are in the region that comprises the contemporary state of Punjab, India. See 1911 census data here:)	−11.1%
1921	7,262,881 (Note: 1921 figure taken from census data by combining the total population of all districts (Jalandhar, Ludhiana, Firozpur, Amritsar, Hoshiarpur, and Gurdaspur (minus Shakargarh Tehsil)), and princely states (Kapurthala, Malerkotla, Faridkot, Patiala, and Nabha) which are in the region that comprises the contemporary state of Punjab, India. See 1921 census data here:)	+6.3%
1931	8,123,076 (Note: 1931 figure taken from census data by combining the total population of all districts (Jalandhar, Ludhiana, Firozpur, Amritsar, Hoshiarpur, and Gurdaspur (minus Shakargarh Tehsil)), and princely states (Kapurthala, Malerkotla, Faridkot, Patiala, and Nabha) which are in the region that comprises the contemporary state of Punjab, India. See 1931 census data here:)	+11.8%
1941	9,757,161 (Note: 1941 figure taken from census data by combining the total population of all districts (Jalandhar, Ludhiana, Firozpur, Amritsar, Hoshiarpur, and Gurdaspur (minus Shakargarh Tehsil)), and princely states (Kapurthala, Malerkotla, Faridkot, Patiala, and Nabha) which are in the region that comprises the contemporary state of Punjab, India. See 1941 census data here:)	+20.1%
1951	9,160,500	−6.1%
1961	11,135,069	+21.6%
1971	13,551,060	+21.7%
1981	16,788,915	+23.9%
1991	20,281,969	+20.8%
2001	24,358,999	+20.1%
2011	27,743,338	+13.9%
Source: Census of India

Punjab is home to 2.3% of India's population; with a density of 551 persons per km^{2}. According to the provisional results of the 2011 national census, Punjab has a population of 27,743,338, making it the 16th most populated state in India. Of which male and female are 14,639,465 and 13,103,873 respectively. 32% of Punjab's population consists of Dalits. In the state, the rate of population growth is 13.9% (2011), lower than national average. Out of total population, 37.5% people live in urban regions. The total figure of population living in urban areas is 10,399,146 of which 5,545,989 are males and while remaining 4,853,157 are females. The urban population in the last 10 years has increased by 37.5%. According to the 2011 Census of India, Punjab has a population of around 27.7 million.

== Population density ==
The table below gives the population density (population per square kilometre) of Punjab throughout the years.

Year	Density (/km^{2})
2011	551
2001	484
1991	403
1981	333

The table below shows the population density by district in Punjab, according to the 2011 census.

Sr. No.	District	Density (/km^{2})	District	Density (/km^{2})
1	Ludhiana	978	Hoshiarpur	469
2	Amritsar	928	Tarn Taran	464
3	SAS Nagar	909	Sangrur	457
4	Jalandhar	836	Moga	444
5	Gurdaspur	647	Faridkot	424
6	Patiala	570	Bathinda	414
7	Fatehgarh Sahib	509	Barnala	402
8	Rupnagar	505	Ferozepur	382
9	Kapurthala	499	Mansa	350
10	SBS Nagar	478	Sri Muktsar Sahib	348
	Punjab		551	

== Gender ==
The table below shows the sex ratio of Punjab through the years.

Decadal sex ratio of Punjab by census years
1911	1921	1931	1941	1951	1961	1971	1981	1991	2001	2011
870	799	815	836	844	854	865	879	882	876	895

Sex Ratio and Urban Population of Punjab by District – Census 2011
Sr. No.	District	Sex Ratio	Urban Males	Urban Females
1	Hoshiarpur	961	1,74,587	1,60,382
2	SBS Nagar	954	75,173	60,243
3	Rupnagar	915	93,396	84,411
4	Jalandhar	915	6,16,421	5,44,750
5	Kapurthala	912	1,50,379	1,32,083
6	Gurdaspur	907	1,92,590	1,68,563
7	Tarn Taran	900	75,047	66,748
8	Sri Muktsar Sahib	896	1,33,420	1,18,771
9	Fazilka	894	1,41,996	1,25,093
10	Moga	893	1,20,216	1,07,030
11	Ferozepur	893	1,53,433	1,32,034
12	Patiala	891	4,03,722	3,59,558
13	Faridkot	890	1,15,889	1,01,162
14	Amritsar	889	7,11,142	6,23,469
15	Sangrur	885	2,73,376	2,42,589
16	Mansa	883	86,548	77,056
17	SAS Nagar	879	2,88,269	2,56,342
18	Barnala	876	1,02,312	88,373
19	Ludhiana	873	11,14,372	9,55,336
20	Fatehgarh Sahib	871	1,00,745	84,737
21	Pathankot	869	1,64,243	1,33,923
22	Bathinda	868	2,68,713	2,30,504
	Punjab (Total)	895	55,45,989	48,53,157

== Fertility rate ==
The table below shows the birth rate per 1000 persons in Punjab through the years.

Birth rate per 1000 in Punjab through the years
Year	Total	Urban	Rural
2017	14.9	14.1	15.6
2016	14.9	14.2	15.6
2015	15.2	14.2	15.9
2014	15.5	14.5	16.2
2013	15.7	14.7	16.3
2012	15.9	14.8	16.5
2011	16.2	15.2	16.8
2010	16.6	15.6	17.2
2009	17.0	15.8	17.7
2008	17.3	16.1	18
2007	17.6	16.4	18.3
2006	17.8	16.8	18.4
2005	18.1	17.0	18.8
2004	18.7	17.6	19.3

According to the National Family Health Survey of 2015–16, the percentage of women age 15-19 who have begun childbearing (teenage pregnancy) was 2.6%.

The table below shows the variation in fertility rate (children per woman) according to the education of a woman in Punjab, as of 2019–21.

Fertility rate by number of years of schooling completed by women in Punjab as of year 2019–21, NFHS-5
Years of schooling	Fertility rate
No schooling	2.5
<5 years	2.5
5–9 years	2.0
10–11 years	1.9
12 or more years	1.5

=== Family planning ===
According to the National Family Health Survey 2020–21, the unmet need for family planning increased from 6.2% in 2015–16 to 9.9% in 2020–21. In the same time period, the unmet need for child spacing increased from 2.4 to 3.7 percent.

Current Use of Family Planning Methods (currently married women age 15–49 years)
Indicator	Urban (2020–21)	Rural (2020–21)	Total (2020–21)	Total (2015–16)
Any method	68.4%	65.4%	66.6%	75.8%
Any modern method	49.4%	51.1%	50.5%	66.3%
Female sterilization	18.0%	25.6%	22.8%	37.5%
Male sterilization	0.5%	0.4%	0.5%	0.6%
IUD/PPIUD	2.8%	3.2%	3.1%	6.8%
Pill	1.1%	1.7%	1.5%	2.5%
Condom	26.6%	19.7%	22.2%	18.9%
Injectables	0.1%	0.1%	0.1%	0.1%

== Mortality ==
=== Infant mortality ===
The list below shows the infant mortality rate per 1000 in Punjab, through the years.

Infant mortality rate per 1000 live births per year, in Punjab through the years
Year	Total	Urban	Rural
2017	21	19	22
2016	21	18	23
2015	23	20	24
2014	24	21	26
2013	26	23	28
2012	30	25	33
2011	30	25	33
2010	34	31	37
2009	38	38	42
2008	41	33	45
2007	43	35	47

=== Maternal mortality ===
The table below shows the maternal mortality rate per one lakh (1,00,000) per year, through the years.

Maternal mortality rate per one lakh (1,00,000) per year, in Punjab through the years
Year	Rate
2017	122
2016	122
2015	122
2014	122
2013	141
2012	141
2011	141
2006	192

== Literacy rate ==
According to the 2011 census, the literacy rate of Punjab was 75.84%. The male literacy was 80.44% and the female literacy was 70.72%. The median number of years of schooling completed in the state was 6.5 for females and 7.8 for males, as of 2011. According to the NSC survey (2017), Punjab's literacy rate was 83.7% (88.5% for males and 78.5% for females). As per the PLFS report (2024), Punjab's literacy rate was 83.4% (87.0% for males and 79.8% for females).

=== Census data ===
==== District-wise ====
Below is a combined table showing the total, rural, and urban literacy rates for each district of Punjab according to the 2011 Census of India.

Literacy Rate by District – Punjab (2011 Census)
District	Total Literacy (%)	Rural Literacy (%)	Urban Literacy (%)
Hoshiarpur	84.59	74.77	78.77
Sahibzada Ajit Singh Nagar (Mohali)	83.80	69.68	77.67
Jalandhar	82.48	70.53	77.03
Ludhiana	82.20	70.12	75.28
Rupnagar	82.19	72.00	77.50
Gurdaspur	79.95	68.12	78.59
Shahid Bhagat Singh Nagar	79.78	70.98	74.04
Fatehgarh Sahib	79.35	69.53	74.24
Kapurthala	79.07	67.73	76.40
Amritsar	76.27	59.64	74.58
Patiala	75.28	60.83	75.72
Moga	70.68	60.90	70.36
Faridkot	69.55	57.38	69.79
Firozpur	68.92	56.95	69.98
Bathinda	68.28	55.46	70.45
Sangrur	67.99	57.83	66.52
Barnala	67.82	57.90	65.78
Tarn Taran	67.81	58.30	67.74
Muktsar	65.81	54.66	67.29
Mansa	61.83	51.68	67.43

==== Religion ====
The table below shows the literacy rate by religion in Punjab, according to 2001 census.

Literacy rate by religion in Punjab - Census 2001
Sr. No.	Religion	Percentage
1	Jains	95.9%
2	Hindus	74.6%
3	Buddhists	72.7%
4	Sikhs	67.3%
5	Christians	54.6%
6	Muslims	51.2%
	All religious groups	69.7%

==== Caste ====
The table below gives the literacy rate of Scheduled castes by district, according to the 2011 census.

Scheduled caste (SC) literacy rate by districts - Census 2011
Sr. No.	District	SC Percentage	District total
1	Hoshiarpur	82.49%	84.59%
2	Rupnagar	78.4%	82.19%
3	Shahid Bhagat Singh Nagar	77.72 %	79.78%
4	SAS Nagar	76.1%	83.80%
5	Jalandhar	76.68%	82.48%
6	Gurdaspur	72.89%	79.95%
7	Ludhiana	72.65%	82.20%
8	Fatehgarh Sahib	72.19%	79.35%
9	Kapurthala	71.29%	79.07%
10	Patiala	62.28%	75.28%
11	Amritsar	59.16%	76.27%
12	Sangrur	57.60%	67.99%
13	Moga	55.23%	70.68%
14	Firozpur	55.38%	68.92%
15	Faridkot	54.91%	69.55%
16	Barnala	54.91%	67.82%
17	Bathinda	53.09%	68.28%
18	Tarn Taran	51.37%	67.81%
19	Muktsar	50.46%	65.81%
20	Mansa	48.72%	61.83%
	Punjab	64.81%	75.84%.

== Human Development Index ==
According UNDP, Punjab's HDI for 2023 is 0.794. The table below shows the district wise human development index of Punjab through the years.

Human Development index of Punjab by district
Sr. No.	District	2017	2011	2001	1991	Percentage change 1991–2017
1	Ludhiana	0.794	0.747	0.761	0.650	22.1%
2	Moga	0.695	0.679	0.683	--	--
3	Sangrur	0.669	0.666	0.654	0.534	25.2%
4	Bathinda	0.659	0.740	0.539	22.2%	
5	Tarn Taran	0.654	0.646	--	--	--
6	SAS Nagar	0.653	0.701	--	--	--
7	Fatehgarh Sahib	0.648	0.69	0.74	--	--
8	Kapurthala	0.646	0.703	0.707	0.603	7.3%
9	Amritsar	0.635	0.685	0.700	0.608	4.4%
10	Rupnagar	0.629	0.675	0.751	0.623	0.9%
11	SBS Nagar	0.627	0.707	0.707	--	--
12	Jalandhar	0.618	0.738	0.708	0.610	1.3%
13	Barnala	0.617	0.649	--	--	--
14	Hoshiarpur	0.615	0.721	0.718	0.606	1.4%
15	Patiala	0.607	0.695	0.697	0.589	3.0%
16	Mansa	0.601	0.595	0.633	--	--
17	Faridkot	0.599	0.642	0.698	0.573	4.5%
18	Muktsar	0.572	0.633	0.651	--	--
19	Firozpur	0.563	0.606	0.689	0.568	-0.8%
20	Pathankot	0.538	--	--	--	--
21	Fazilka	0.505	--	--	--	--
22	Gurdaspur	0.503	0.673	0.723	0.612	-17.6%
	Punjab	0.620	0.643	0.667	0.591	4.9%

== Caste population ==
As of September 2020, the caste population data foreach Forward caste citizen in Punjab collected in Socio Economic and Caste Census 2011 has not been released to public by Government of India. Scheduled Castes and Other Backward Classes form 63.2% of the total population of Punjab.

Castes of Punjab (2011)
1. Upper castes (Brahmin, Khatri, Arora, Baniya, Hindu Rajput, Ahluwalia, Jats) (33.0%)
2. Scheduled Castes (Dalits) (31.9%)
3. Other Backward Classes (OBC or BC) (31.3%)
4. religious minorities (3.80%)

Caste Population data of Punjab
Constitutional categories	Population (%)	Castes
General caste	33%	includes 18% Jat Sikh, 15 % Ahir(in Patiala & Sangrur), Brahmin, Khatri, Arora, Rajput (includes Sikh Rajputs), Sood, Bania, Bhatia, Mahajan
Other Backward Classes (OBC)	31.3%	includes Sainis,Kamboj, Labana, Tarkhan/Ramgarhia, Kumhar/Prajapati, Arain, Gujjar, Teli, Banjara, Others
Scheduled Castes (Dalits not including Rai Sikh statistics)	31.9%	includes Mazhabi Sikh - 10%, (Ramdasia, Ravidassia, Ad-Dharmi-Chamar castes cluster - 13.1%), Balmiki/Bhanghi - 3.5%, Bazigar - 1.05% Others castes like Sansi, chimba, nai, julaha and many more - 4%
religious minorities	3.8%	includes Muslims, Christians, Buddhists, Jains

Below is the list of districts according to the percentage of their SC population, according to 2011 census.

Scheduled Caste population by district (2011)
Sr. No.	District	Percentage
1	Shahid Bhagat Singh Nagar	42.51%
2	Muktsar	42.31%
3	Fazilka	42.27%
4	Firozpur	42.07%
5	Jalandhar	38.95%
6	Faridkot	38.92%
7	Moga	36.50%
8	Hoshiarpur	35.14%
9	Kapurthala	33.94%
10	Tarn Taran	33.71%
11	Mansa	33.63%
12	Bathinda	32.44%
13	Barnala	32.24%
14	Fatehgarh Sahib	32.07%
15	Amritsar	30.95%
16	Pathankot	30.60%
17	Sangrur	27.89%
18	Ludhiana	26.39%
19	Rupnagar	25.42%
20	Patiala	24.55%
21	Gurdaspur	23.03%
22	SAS Nagar	21.74%

Scheduled caste (SC) population among different religions in Punjab - Census 2011

Religion	Total Population	Scheduled Caste Population	Scheduled Caste Population %
Sikh	16,004,754	5,390,484	33.68%
Hindu	10,678,138	3,442,305	32.23%
Buddhist	33,237	27,390	82.40%

District wise Scheduled Caste Percentage (For each caste separately) (2011)
Sr. No.	District	Ravidassia/Addharmi Caste %	Mazhabi/Valmiki Caste %	Rai-Sikh Caste %	Julaha Caste %	Sansi Caste %
1	SBS Nagar	34.88%	2.72%	0.02%	0.2%	0.32%
2	Hoshiarpur	26.34%	3.62%	0.02%	0.55%	0.17%
3	Jalandhar	21.43%	11.07%	0.87%	2.03%	0.45%
4	Fatehgarh Sahib	19.2%	7.61%	0.01%	0.16%	0.34%
5	Rupnagar	16.85%	4.36%	0%	0.84%	0.06%
6	Sangrur	15.77%	10.51%	0.01%	0.04%	0.64%
7	Barnala	15.18%	13.22%	0%	0.05%	0.36%
8	Ludhiana	14.94%	6.4%	0.52%	0.34%	0.32%
9	SAS Nagar	11.65%	5.82%	0.02%	0.23%	0.16%
10	Mansa	11.33%	16.1%	1.48%	0.04%	0.15%
11	Kapurthala	11.04%	17.21%	2.53%	0.31%	0.25%
12	Patiala	10.18%	7.56%	0.15%	0.08%	0.3%
13	Bathinda	7.83%	17.84%	0.23%	0.19%	0.16%
14	Gurdaspur	5.79%	6.6%	0.1%	2.11%	0.79%
15	Muktsar	5.54%	25.9%	0.75%	1.57%	0.33%
16	Faridkot	4.35%	26.57%	0.02%	0.05%	0.27%
17	Moga	3.14%	25.39%	1.43%	0.04%	0.14%
18	Firozpur	1.56%	14.5%	18.44%	2.33%	0.51%
19	Amritsar	1.28%	22.84%	1.72%	1.28%	0.77%
20	Tarn Taran	0.32%	28.17%	0.03%	0.01%	1.57

=== Crimes against SC/STs ===
The table below shows the number of recorded crimes against scheduled caste and scheduled tribe people from 2010 to 2018.

Crimes against scheduled caste and scheduled tribe people in Punjab
Year	Murder	Rape	POA Act	Hurt	Kidnapping	Miscellaneous
2018	13	30	32	6	4	82
2017	7	17	31	3	2	58
2016	7	16	41	1	3	64
2015	8	14	23	5	3	94
2014	4	19	16	2	3	79
2013	7	22	13	37	8	39
2012	4	12	8	21	2	24
2011	5	9	24	27	2	22
2010	4	18	50	13	0	30

== Urbanization ==
The table below shows the percentage of rural population in each district of Punjab in ascending order, according to the 2011 census.

Percentage of rural population by district - Census 2011
Sr. No.	District	Rural percentage
1	Ludhiana	40.84%
2	SAS Nagar	45.24%
3	Amritsar	46.42%
4	Jalandhar	47.07%
5	Pathankot	55.93%
6	Patiala	59.74%
7	Bathinda	64.05%
8	Faridkot	64.85%
9	Kapurthala	65.35%
10	Barnala	67.98%
11	Sangrur	68.83%
12	Fatehgarh Sahib	69.02%
13	Ferozepur	71.54%
14	Sri Muktsar Sahib	72.04%
15	Fazilka	73.97%
16	Rupnagar	74.03%
17	Moga	77.18%
18	Gurdaspur	77.73%
19	Mansa	78.75%
20	Hoshiarpur	78.89%
21	SBS Nagar	79.52%
22	Tarn Taran	87.34%
	Punjab (whole)	62.52%

== Languages spoken ==
Languages of Punjab (2011)
1. Punjabi (official) (89.8%)
2. Hindi (7.85%)
3. Others (2.83%)

The Punjabi language written in the Gurmukhi script is the official language of the state. Muslims form a slight majority in the Malerkotla town and use Shahmukhi for communication. Punjabi is the sole official language of Punjab and is spoken by the majority of the population numbering around 24,919,067 constituting (89.82%) of the population as of 2011 census report. Hindi is the second largest language, spoken by 2,177,853 constituting 7.85% of the population. And the remaining 646,418 spoke other Indian languages, comprising 2.83% in the Others category.

== Religion in Punjab ==
Religion in Punjab, India (2011)
1. Sikhism (57.7%)
2. Hinduism (38.5%)
3. Islam (1.93%)
4. Christianity (1.26%)
5. Jainism (0.16%)
6. Buddhism (0.12%)
7. Others/not stated (0.35%)

Religion Map of Punjab as of the 2011 Census (Orange: Hindu, Yellow: Sikh). Darker shade equates to higher percentage of the respective district

=== 2001 and 2011 census ===
Sikhism is the most common faith in Punjab, numbering over 16 million people representing 57.69% of the population, making it the only Sikh-majority state in India. Around 38.49% of the population (10.68 million) follow Hinduism, while Islam is followed by 1.93% of the population (535,000) and Christianity 1.26% (350,000). Other faiths include Buddhism and Jainism which are followed in smaller numbers. There were also nearly 90,000 people that did not state their religion.

Religion	2001 Census		2011 Census	
Religion	Number	%	Number	%
Sikh	14,592,387	59.91%	16,004,754	57.69%
Hindu	8,997,942	36.94%	10,678,138	38.49%
Muslim	382,045	1.57%	535,489	1.93%
Christian	292,800	1.20%	348,230	1.26%
Jain	39,276	0.16%	45,040	0.16%
Buddhist	41,487	0.17%	33,237	0.12%
Others	8,594	0.03%	10,886	0.04%
Religion not stated	n/a	n/a	87,564	0.31%
Total	24,358,999	100.00%	27,743,338	100.00%

==== Urban and rural areas ====
The table given below shows the religion in the urban areas of Punjab, according to 2011 census.

Religion in urban vs rural areas of Punjab
Religion	Urban		Rural	
Religion	Percentage	Population	Percentage	Population
Hindu	60.41%	6,282,072	25.35%	4,396,066
Sikh	35.16%	3,656,299	71.20%	12,348,455
Muslim	2.47%	256,664	1.61%	278,825
Christian	1.01%	105,253	1.40%	242,977
Jain	0.39%	40,674	0.03%	4,366
Buddhist	0.09%	9,660	0.14%	23,577
Other religions and persuasions	0.04%	4,240	0.04%	6,646
Religion not stated	0.43%	44,284	0.25%	43,280
Total		10,399,146		17,344,192

The table below shows the population of different religions in absolute numbers in the urban and rural areas of Punjab.

Absolute numbers of different religious groups in Punjab
		Hindu	Sikh	Christian	Muslim	Other religions
1991	Urban	29,81,804	15,42,623	33,503	60,395	29,432
1991	Rural	32,18,391	86,56,518	1,51,431	1,07,699	7,119
2001	Urban	49,33,743	30,24,950	81,642	1,66,529	55,649
2001	Rural	40,64,199	1,15,67,437	2,11,160	2,15,518	38,176
2011	Urban	62,82,072	36,56,299	1,05,253	2,56,664	98,858
2011	Rural	43,96,066	1,23,48,455	2,42,977	2,78,825	77,869

=== 1971 census ===
Religions in contemporary Punjab State, India region (1971)
1. Sikhism (60.2%)
2. Hinduism (37.5%)
3. Christianity (1.20%)
4. Islam (0.84%)
5. Jainism (0.16%)
6. Others (Note: Including Buddhism, Zoroastrianism, Judaism, Tribals, others, or not stated) (0.04%)

Following the Punjab Reorganisation Act of 1966, the borders of the East Punjab region were finalized and delineated. The states that form this region at present include Punjab, Haryana, Himachal Pradesh, the Union Territory of Chandigarh.

The religious demography according to the 1971 census for the contemporary state of Punjab, India is shown below, broken down by district with an overall total.

Religion in the districts that comprise the contemporary state of Punjab, India region (1971)
District	Sikhism		Hinduism		Christianity		Islam		Jainism		Others		Total	
District	Pop.	%	Pop.	%	Pop.	%	Pop.	%	Pop.	%	Pop.	%	Pop.	%
Firozpur district	1,240,218	65.07%	639,911	33.58%	16,158	0.85%	6,340	0.33%	1,084	0.06%	2,122	0.11%	1,905,833	100%
Amritsar district	1,362,291	74.22%	430,019	23.43%	37,703	2.05%	3,044	0.17%	2,295	0.13%	148	0.01%	1,835,500	100%
Jalandhar district	653,018	44.9%	784,048	53.9%	10,705	0.74%	3,362	0.23%	2,660	0.18%	708	0.05%	1,454,501	100%
Ludhiana district	932,712	65.71%	471,519	33.22%	3,027	0.21%	5,620	0.4%	6,176	0.44%	367	0.03%	1,419,421	100%
Bhatinda district	1,014,091	76.93%	297,382	22.56%	752	0.06%	3,829	0.29%	2,072	0.16%	8	0%	1,318,134	100%
Gurdaspur district	550,996	44.82%	590,290	48.02%	79,732	6.49%	6,868	0.56%	152	0.01%	1,211	0.1%	1,229,249	100%
Patiala district	659,020	54.24%	539,128	44.37%	1,696	0.14%	13,644	1.12%	1,380	0.11%	232	0.02%	1,215,100	100%
Sangrur district	767,071	66.9%	311,197	27.14%	806	0.07%	64,448	5.62%	2,982	0.26%	146	0.01%	1,146,650	100%
Hoshiarpur district	414,323	39.38%	623,413	59.25%	8,594	0.82%	3,456	0.33%	1,602	0.15%	765	0.07%	1,052,153	100%
Rupar district	303,102	55.61%	237,016	43.49%	1,212	0.22%	2,978	0.55%	655	0.12%	42	0.01%	545,005	100%
Kapurthala district	263,130	61.26%	163,312	38.02%	1,817	0.42%	858	0.2%	325	0.08%	72	0.02%	429,514	100%
Total	8,159,972	60.22%	5,087,235	37.54%	162,202	1.2%	114,447	0.84%	21,383	0.16%	5,821	0.04%	13,551,060	100%
Note: Territory comprises the contemporary state of Punjab, India.

=== 1961 census ===
Religions in East Punjab, India region (1961) (Note: Immediately following the partition of India in 1947, districts and Princely states that ultimately fell on the eastern side of the Radcliffe Line formed the subdivision of East Punjab, which included Patiala and East Punjab States Union, Chief Commissioner's Province of Himachal Pradesh, and Bilaspur State. The states that make up this region in the contemporary era are Punjab, Haryana, Himachal Pradesh, and the Union Territory of Chandigarh.)
1. Hinduism (65.8%)
2. Sikhism (31.3%)
3. Islam (1.93%)
4. Christianity (0.69%)
5. Jainism (0.23%)
6. Others (0.10%)

The 1961 Census data reflects the post-reorganization administrative boundaries. By this time, the Patiala and East Punjab States Union (PEPSU) had been fully merged into Punjab on 1 November 1956 under the States Reorganisation Act. Additionally, the former princely state of Bilaspur, a Part-C state, was merged into Himachal Pradesh in 1954. Therefore, the 1961 census tables include populations from the territories of both Punjab (including the former PEPSU regions) and Himachal Pradesh (including Bilaspur), as per their reorganized state boundaries.

The religious demography of the East Punjab region including the contemporary subdivisions of Punjab, Haryana, Himachal Pradesh, and the Union Territory of Chandigarh is broken down below by district with an overall total as per the 1961 census of India.

Religion in the Districts of East Punjab, India region (1961)
District	Hinduism		Sikhism		Islam		Christianity		Jainism		Others		Total	
District	Pop.	%	Pop.	%	Pop.	%	Pop.	%	Pop.	%	Pop.	%	Pop.	%
Firozpur district	657,712	40.62%	936,953	57.87%	3,369	0.21%	19,234	1.19%	1,746	0.11%	102	0.01%	1,619,116	100%
Hissar district	1,374,258	89.21%	152,719	9.91%	6,203	0.4%	1,022	0.07%	6,021	0.39%	285	0.02%	1,540,508	100%
Amritsar district	506,170	32.98%	990,344	64.52%	2,401	0.16%	33,739	2.2%	1,987	0.13%	275	0.02%	1,534,916	100%
Karnal district	1,293,354	86.78%	177,602	11.92%	14,159	0.95%	2,094	0.14%	3,207	0.22%	14	0%	1,490,430	100%
Sangrur district	738,816	51.86%	622,227	43.67%	55,738	3.91%	577	0.04%	7,328	0.51%	2	0%	1,424,688	100%
Rohtak district	1,400,347	98.59%	6,439	0.45%	7,349	0.52%	355	0.02%	5,471	0.39%	430	0.03%	1,420,391	100%
Ambala district	981,288	71.45%	340,968	24.83%	40,351	2.94%	4,877	0.36%	5,318	0.39%	675	0.05%	1,373,477	100%
Gurgaon district	1,011,862	81.56%	8,362	0.67%	216,767	17.47%	730	0.06%	2,930	0.24%	55	0%	1,240,706	100%
Hoshiarpur district	835,436	67.73%	381,965	30.97%	7,050	0.57%	7,207	0.58%	1,794	0.15%	41	0%	1,233,493	100%
Jalandhar district	662,631	53.99%	550,232	44.83%	3,184	0.26%	8,733	0.71%	2,278	0.19%	309	0.03%	1,227,367	100%
Kangra district	1,043,387	98.2%	8,854	0.83%	6,701	0.63%	1,251	0.12%	127	0.01%	2,198	0.21%	1,062,518	100%
Bhatinda district	285,967	27.1%	762,677	72.28%	3,340	0.32%	956	0.09%	2,209	0.21%	28	0%	1,055,177	100%
Patiala district	480,086	45.78%	553,438	52.77%	11,714	1.12%	1,565	0.15%	1,944	0.19%	31	0%	1,048,778	100%
Ludhiana district	365,429	35.74%	644,266	63.01%	4,686	0.46%	2,638	0.26%	5,110	0.5%	390	0.04%	1,022,519	100%
Gurdaspur district	494,635	50.06%	424,190	42.93%	5,566	0.56%	62,231	6.3%	69	0.01%	1,303	0.13%	987,994	100%
Mahendragarh district	543,480	99.2%	2,222	0.41%	1,456	0.27%	29	0.01%	663	0.12%	0	0%	547,850	100%
Mandi district	380,453	99.01%	1,759	0.46%	1,868	0.49%	28	0.01%	10	0%	141	0.04%	384,259	100%
Mahasu district	354,247	98.68%	793	0.22%	2,958	0.82%	203	0.06%	9	0%	759	0.21%	358,969	100%
Kapurthala district	140,828	40.96%	200,117	58.21%	856	0.25%	1,535	0.45%	416	0.12%	26	0.01%	343,778	100%
Chamba district	197,821	93.94%	398	0.19%	10,512	4.99%	105	0.05%	10	0%	1,733	0.82%	210,579	100%
Sirmur district	185,020	93.66%	3,867	1.96%	8,203	4.15%	221	0.11%	64	0.03%	176	0.09%	197,551	100%
Bilaspur district	155,094	97.66%	1,593	1%	2,078	1.31%	35	0.02%	2	0%	4	0%	158,806	100%
Simla district	104,784	93.01%	5,392	4.79%	1,214	1.08%	1,059	0.94%	135	0.12%	69	0.06%	112,653	100%
Kinnaur district	37,384	91.22%	27	0.07%	0	0%	0	0%	0	0%	3,569	8.71%	40,980	100%
Lahaul and Spiti district	9,575	46.81%	162	0.79%	1,210	5.92%	2	0.01%	1	0%	9,503	46.46%	20,453	100%
Total	14,240,064	65.75%	6,777,566	31.29%	418,933	1.93%	150,426	0.69%	48,849	0.23%	22,118	0.1%	21,657,956	100%
Note: Territory comprises the contemporary subdivisions of Punjab, India, Chandigarh, Haryana, and Himachal Pradesh.

==== Contemporary Punjab state ====
Religions in contemporary Punjab State, India region (1961) (Note: 1961 figure taken from the 1961 census of India by combining the total population of all districts (Firozpur, Amritsar, Hoshiarpur, Jalandhar, Ludhiana, and Gurdaspur, Bhatinda, Sangrur, Barnala, Patiala, and Kapurthala) which are in the region that comprises the contemporary state of Punjab, India. See 1961 census data here:)
1. Sikhism (52.8%)
2. Hinduism (45.0%)
3. Christianity (1.20%)
4. Islam (0.85%)
5. Jainism (0.22%)
6. Others (0.02%)

The religious demography according to the 1961 census for the region that comprises the contemporary state of Punjab, India is also shown below, broken down by district with an overall total.

Religion in the districts that comprise the contemporary Punjab State, India region (1961)
District	Sikhism		Hinduism		Christianity		Islam		Jainism		Others		Total	
District	Pop.	%	Pop.	%	Pop.	%	Pop.	%	Pop.	%	Pop.	%	Pop.	%
Firozpur district	936,953	57.87%	657,712	40.62%	19,234	1.19%	3,369	0.21%	1,746	0.11%	102	0.01%	1,619,116	100%
Amritsar district	990,344	64.52%	506,170	32.98%	33,739	2.2%	2,401	0.16%	1,987	0.13%	275	0.02%	1,534,916	100%
Sangrur district	622,227	43.67%	738,816	51.86%	577	0.04%	55,738	3.91%	7,328	0.51%	2	0%	1,424,688	100%
Hoshiarpur district	381,965	30.97%	835,436	67.73%	7,207	0.58%	7,050	0.57%	1,794	0.15%	41	0%	1,233,493	100%
Jalandhar district	550,232	44.83%	662,631	53.99%	8,733	0.71%	3,184	0.26%	2,278	0.19%	309	0.03%	1,227,367	100%
Bhatinda district	762,677	72.28%	285,967	27.1%	956	0.09%	3,340	0.32%	2,209	0.21%	28	0%	1,055,177	100%
Patiala district	553,438	52.77%	480,086	45.78%	1,565	0.15%	11,714	1.12%	1,944	0.19%	31	0%	1,048,778	100%
Ludhiana district	644,266	63.01%	365,429	35.74%	2,638	0.26%	4,686	0.46%	5,110	0.5%	390	0.04%	1,022,519	100%
Gurdaspur district	424,190	42.93%	494,635	50.06%	62,231	6.3%	5,566	0.56%	69	0.01%	1,303	0.13%	987,994	100%
Kapurthala district	200,117	58.21%	140,828	40.96%	1,535	0.45%	856	0.25%	416	0.12%	26	0.01%	343,778	100%
Total	6,066,409	52.76%	5,167,710	44.95%	138,415	1.2%	97,904	0.85%	24,881	0.22%	2,507	0.02%	11,497,826	100%
Note: Territory roughly comprises the contemporary state of Punjab, India. Certain regions that would ultimately form part of the contemporary state (Kharar and Rupar tehsils) are excluded from the data table above, while certain regions that would ultimately be bifurcated from the contemporary state (Una, Jind, and Narwana tehsils) are included in the data table above. The demarcation an reorganization of boundaries in contemporary Punjab state occurred in 1966, officially termed Punjab Reorganisation Act, 1966.

=== 1951 census ===
Religions in East Punjab, India region (1951) (Note: Immediately following the partition of India in 1947, districts and Princely states that ultimately fell on the eastern side of the Radcliffe Line formed up the subdivision of East Punjab, which included Patiala and East Punjab States Union, Chief Commissioner's Province of Himachal Pradesh, and Bilaspur State. The states that make up this region in the contemporary era are Punjab, Haryana, Himachal Pradesh, and the Union Territory of Chandigarh.)
1. Hinduism (64.6%)
2. Sikhism (32.8%)
3. Islam (1.77%)
4. Christianity (0.58%)
5. Jainism (0.27%)
6. Others (0.02%)

After Partition, East Punjab underwent significant restructuring, particularly in its Punjab States Agency. Several princely states in the region were merged in 1948 to form the Patiala and East Punjab States Union (PEPSU), while a number of hill states in the north were integrated to form Himachal Pradesh. Bilaspur Princely state remained a separate entity as Bilaspur State. In the 1951 census, these regions — Punjab, PEPSU, Himachal Pradesh, Bilaspur, and Delhi — were grouped together in a single volume titled Census of India, 1951: Punjab, Pepsu, Himachal Pradesh, Bilaspur & Delhi. Although Delhi was included in this volume, it had become a separate province in 1911 and is not considered part of East Punjab for statistical purposes. Below is the religious demographics of this region broken down by district with an overall total as per the 1951 census of India.

In the following tables, 268,602 people from the Jullundur Division were not classified by religion due to missing records caused by a fire in the Jullundur Census Tabulation Office. As a result, their religious affiliation could not be included at the district level. These unclassified populations were distributed across Amritsar district (96,720 persons), Gurdaspur district (89,512 persons), Jullundur district (46,834 persons), Ferozepur district (18,283 persons), Kangra district (9,565 persons), Hoshiarpur district (6,362 persons), and Ludhiana district (1,326 persons). While their district level religious details were omitted, the number was included on the overall provincial tabulation. According to consolidated data, out of the 268,602 individuals, 149,758 persons were Sikhs, 1,658 persons were Muslims and 117,186 persons were Hindus and others, Therefore, the actual total population of the province/state was not 16,975,754 as shown in the tables below, but 17,244,356 after including these 268,602 individuals.

Religion in the Districts of East Punjab, India region (1951)
District	Hinduism		Sikhism		Islam		Christianity		Jainism		Others		Total responses		Total population	
District	Pop.	%	Pop.	%	Pop.	%	Pop.	%	Pop.	%	Pop.	%	Pop.	%	Pop.	%
Firozpur district	505,937	38.67%	780,024	59.62%	4,805	0.37%	11,976	0.92%	5,475	0.42%	20	0%	1,308,237	98.62%	1,326,520	100%
Amritsar district	351,710	27.69%	897,309	70.64%	4,237	0.33%	14,753	1.16%	2,115	0.17%	196	0.02%	1,270,320	92.92%	1,367,040	100%
Rohtak district	1,105,046	98.48%	7,907	0.7%	2,562	0.23%	153	0.01%	5,878	0.52%	500	0.04%	1,122,046	100%	1,122,046	100%
Hoshiarpur district	794,688	73.2%	283,720	26.13%	1,353	0.12%	4,027	0.37%	1,823	0.17%	13	0%	1,085,624	99.42%	1,091,986	100%
Karnal district	974,959	90.33%	96,458	8.94%	3,658	0.34%	490	0.05%	3,813	0.35%	1	0%	1,079,379	100%	1,079,379	100%
Hissar district	954,714	91.3%	80,394	7.69%	3,312	0.32%	609	0.06%	6,609	0.63%	7	0%	1,045,645	100%	1,045,645	100%
Jalandhar district	429,747	42.6%	569,487	56.45%	2,569	0.25%	5,969	0.59%	985	0.1%	9	0%	1,008,766	95.56%	1,055,600	100%
Gurgaon district	794,019	82.06%	6,310	0.65%	163,663	16.91%	769	0.08%	2,722	0.28%	181	0.02%	967,664	100%	967,664	100%
Ambala district	681,477	72.21%	232,456	24.63%	23,106	2.45%	3,690	0.39%	2,983	0.32%	22	0%	943,734	100%	943,734	100%
Kangra district	898,564	96.99%	18,401	1.99%	6,426	0.69%	604	0.07%	1,199	0.13%	1,283	0.14%	926,477	98.98%	936,042	100%
Ludhiana district	301,398	37.36%	497,419	61.65%	3,360	0.42%	1,200	0.15%	3,397	0.42%	5	0%	806,779	99.84%	808,105	100%
Gurdaspur district	346,884	45.54%	354,681	46.56%	9,370	1.23%	50,457	6.62%	388	0.05%	2	0%	761,782	89.49%	851,294	100%
Bhatinda district	144,305	21.64%	521,045	78.14%	416	0.06%	450	0.07%	574	0.09%	19	0%	666,809	100%	666,809	100%
Sangrur district	420,218	65.36%	215,023	33.44%	3,741	0.58%	341	0.05%	3,610	0.56%	1	0%	642,934	100%	642,934	100%
Barnala district	112,635	20.99%	380,811	70.95%	41,673	7.76%	113	0.02%	1,484	0.28%	12	0%	536,728	100%	536,728	100%
Patiala district	273,087	52.09%	246,953	47.1%	2,893	0.55%	499	0.1%	689	0.13%	148	0.03%	524,269	100%	524,269	100%
Mohinder Garh district	438,347	98.93%	2,615	0.59%	1,450	0.33%	5	0%	657	0.15%	0	0%	443,074	100%	443,074	100%
Mahasu district	327,998	99.21%	730	0.22%	1,795	0.54%	85	0.03%	4	0%	2	0%	330,614	100%	330,614	100%
Mandi district	308,302	99.25%	1,056	0.34%	1,268	0.41%	0	0%	0	0%	0	0%	310,626	100%	310,626	100%
Kapurthala district	104,679	35.48%	187,568	63.57%	854	0.29%	1,547	0.52%	269	0.09%	154	0.05%	295,071	100%	295,071	100%
Fatehgarh Sahib district	80,141	33.76%	154,714	65.17%	2,269	0.96%	267	0.11%	6	0%	0	0%	237,397	100%	237,397	100%
Chamba district	170,333	96.75%	300	0.17%	5,208	2.96%	208	0.12%	1	0%	0	0%	176,050	100%	176,050	100%
Sirmoor district	157,815	95.03%	2,626	1.58%	5,588	3.36%	19	0.01%	29	0.02%	0	0%	166,077	100%	166,077	100%
Kohistan district	130,937	88.83%	13,206	8.96%	2,617	1.78%	343	0.23%	289	0.2%	11	0.01%	147,403	100%	147,403	100%
Bilaspur district	124,393	98.65%	307	0.24%	1,394	1.11%	5	0%	0	0%	0	0%	126,099	100%	126,099	100%
Simla district	37,287	80.8%	7,417	16.07%	659	1.43%	596	1.29%	131	0.28%	60	0.13%	46,150	100%	46,150	100%
Total responses	10,969,620	64.62%	5,558,937	32.75%	300,246	1.77%	99,175	0.58%	45,130	0.27%	2,646	0.02%	16,975,754	98.44%	—N/a	—N/a
Total population	—N/a	—N/a	—N/a	—N/a	—N/a	—N/a	—N/a	—N/a	—N/a	—N/a	—N/a	—N/a	—N/a	—N/a	17,244,356	100%
Note: Territory comprises the contemporary subdivisions of Punjab, India, Chandigarh, Haryana, and Himachal Pradesh.

==== Contemporary Punjab state ====
Religions in contemporary Punjab State, India region (1951) (Note: 1951 figure taken from the 1951 census of India by combining the total population of all districts (Firozpur, Amritsar, Hoshiarpur, Jalandhar, Ludhiana, and Gurdaspur, Bhatinda, Sangrur, Barnala, Patiala, Kapurthala, and Fatehgarh Sahib) which are in the region that comprises the contemporary state of Punjab, India. See 1951 census data here:)
1. Sikhism (55.6%)
2. Hinduism (42.3%)
3. Christianity (1.00%)
4. Islam (0.85%)
5. Jainism (0.23%)
6. Others (0.01%)

The religious demography according to the 1951 census for the region that comprises the contemporary state of Punjab, India is also shown below, broken down by district with an overall total.

Religion in the districts that comprise the contemporary Punjab State, India region (1951)
District	Sikhism		Hinduism		Christianity		Islam		Jainism		Others		Total	
District	Pop.	%	Pop.	%	Pop.	%	Pop.	%	Pop.	%	Pop.	%	Pop.	%
Firozpur district	780,024	59.62%	505,937	38.67%	11,976	0.92%	4,805	0.37%	5,475	0.42%	20	0%	1,308,237	100%
Amritsar district	897,309	70.64%	351,710	27.69%	14,753	1.16%	4,237	0.33%	2,115	0.17%	196	0.02%	1,270,320	100%
Hoshiarpur district	283,720	26.13%	794,688	73.2%	4,027	0.37%	1,353	0.12%	1,823	0.17%	13	0%	1,085,624	100%
Jalandhar district	569,487	56.45%	429,747	42.6%	5,969	0.59%	2,569	0.25%	985	0.1%	9	0%	1,008,766	100%
Ludhiana district	497,419	61.65%	301,398	37.36%	1,200	0.15%	3,360	0.42%	3,397	0.42%	5	0%	806,779	100%
Gurdaspur district	354,681	46.56%	346,884	45.54%	50,457	6.62%	9,370	1.23%	388	0.05%	2	0%	761,782	100%
Bhatinda district	521,045	78.14%	144,305	21.64%	450	0.07%	416	0.06%	574	0.09%	19	0%	666,809	100%
Sangrur district	215,023	33.44%	420,218	65.36%	341	0.05%	3,741	0.58%	3,610	0.56%	1	0%	642,934	100%
Barnala district	380,811	70.95%	112,635	20.99%	113	0.02%	41,673	7.76%	1,484	0.28%	12	0%	536,728	100%
Patiala district	246,953	47.1%	273,087	52.09%	499	0.1%	2,893	0.55%	689	0.13%	148	0.03%	524,269	100%
Kapurthala district	187,568	63.57%	104,679	35.48%	1,547	0.52%	854	0.29%	269	0.09%	154	0.05%	295,071	100%
Fatehgarh Sahib district	154,714	65.17%	80,141	33.76%	267	0.11%	2,269	0.96%	6	0%	0	0%	237,397	100%
Total	5,088,754	55.65%	3,865,429	42.27%	91,599	1%	77,540	0.85%	20,815	0.23%	579	0.01%	9,144,716	100%
Note: Territory roughly comprises the contemporary state of Punjab, India. Certain regions that would ultimately form part of the contemporary state (Kharar and Rupar tehsils) are excluded from the data table above, while certain regions that would ultimately be bifurcated from the contemporary state (Una, Jind, and Narwana tehsils) are included in the data table above. The demarcation an reorganization of boundaries in contemporary Punjab state occurred in 1966, officially termed Punjab Reorganisation Act, 1966.

=== 1941 census ===
==== East Punjab region ====
Religions in East Punjab, India region (1941) (Note: 1941 figure taken from census data by combining the total population of all districts (Hisar, Rohtak, Gurgaon, Karnal, Jalandhar, Ludhiana, Firozpur, Amritsar, Simla, Kangra, Ambala, Hoshiarpur, and Gurdaspur (minus Shakargarh Tehsil)), and princely states (Loharu, Dujana, Pataudi, Kalsia, Kapurthala, Malerkotla, Faridkot, Patiala, Jind, Nabha, Sirmoor, Simla Hill, Bilaspur, Mandi, Suket, and Chamba) in Punjab Province, British India that ultimately fell on the eastern side of the Radcliffe Line. See 1941 census data here: Immediately following the partition of India in 1947, these districts and princely states would ultimately make up the subdivision of East Punjab, which also included Patiala and East Punjab States Union, Chief Commissioner's Province of Himachal Pradesh, and Bilaspur State. The states that make up this region in the contemporary era are Punjab, India, Chandigarh, Haryana, and Himachal Pradesh.)
1. Hinduism (Note: Including Ad-Dharmis) (47.0%)
2. Islam (30.9%)
3. Sikhism (21.1%)
4. Christianity (0.69%)
5. Jainism (0.21%)
6. Others (0.12%)

Prior to partition, the eastern portion of Punjab that was ultimately awarded to India following the demarcation of the Radcliffe Line was made into a new province – East Punjab. The area includes the contemporary states of Punjab, Haryana, and Himachal Pradesh. Below is the religious demographics of this region broken down by district and princely state with an overall total as per the 1941 Indian census.

Religion in the Districts & Princely States of East Punjab, India region (1941)
District/ Princely State	Hinduism		Islam		Sikhism		Christianity		Jainism		Others		Total	
District/ Princely State	Pop.	%	Pop.	%	Pop.	%	Pop.	%	Pop.	%	Pop.	%	Pop.	%
Patiala State	597,488	30.86%	436,539	22.55%	896,021	46.28%	1,592	0.08%	3,101	0.16%	1,518	0.08%	1,936,259	100%
Firozpur District	287,733	20.22%	641,448	45.07%	479,486	33.69%	12,607	0.89%	1,674	0.12%	128	0.01%	1,423,076	100%
Amritsar District	217,431	15.38%	657,695	46.52%	510,845	36.13%	25,973	1.84%	1,911	0.14%	21	0%	1,413,876	100%
Hoshiarpur District	584,080	49.91%	380,759	32.53%	198,194	16.93%	6,165	0.53%	1,125	0.1%	0	0%	1,170,323	100%
Jalandhar District	311,010	27.59%	509,804	45.23%	298,741	26.5%	6,233	0.55%	1,395	0.12%	7	0%	1,127,190	100%
Hisar District	652,842	64.85%	285,208	28.33%	60,731	6.03%	1,292	0.13%	6,126	0.61%	510	0.05%	1,006,709	100%
Karnal District	666,301	66.99%	304,346	30.6%	19,887	2%	1,249	0.13%	2,789	0.28%	3	0%	994,575	100%
Rohtak District	780,474	81.61%	166,569	17.42%	1,466	0.15%	1,043	0.11%	6,847	0.72%	0	0%	956,399	100%
Kangra District	846,531	94.12%	43,249	4.81%	4,809	0.53%	788	0.09%	101	0.01%	3,899	0.43%	899,377	100%
Gurdaspur District (Note: Does not include Shakargarh Tehsil, which was awarded to Pakistan as part of the Radcliffe Line.)	174,221	20.21%	440,323	51.08%	200,688	23.28%	46,743	5.42%	25	0%	6	0%	862,006	100%
Gurgaon District	560,537	65.83%	285,992	33.59%	637	0.07%	1,673	0.2%	2,613	0.31%	6	0%	851,458	100%
Ambala District	412,658	48.68%	268,999	31.73%	156,543	18.47%	6,065	0.72%	3,065	0.36%	415	0.05%	847,745	100%
Ludhiana District	171,715	20.98%	302,482	36.95%	341,175	41.68%	1,913	0.23%	1,279	0.16%	51	0.01%	818,615	100%
Kapurthala State	61,546	16.27%	213,754	56.49%	88,350	23.35%	1,667	0.44%	380	0.1%	12,683	3.35%	378,380	100%
Jind State	268,355	74.17%	50,972	14.09%	40,981	11.33%	161	0.04%	1,294	0.36%	49	0.01%	361,812	100%
Simla Hill States	345,716	96.16%	10,812	3.01%	2,693	0.75%	161	0.04%	126	0.04%	12	0%	359,520	100%
Nabha State	146,518	42.59%	70,373	20.45%	122,451	35.59%	221	0.06%	480	0.14%	1	0%	344,044	100%
Mandi State	227,463	97.79%	4,328	1.86%	583	0.25%	11	0%	0	0%	208	0.09%	232,593	100%
Faridkot State	21,814	10.95%	61,352	30.79%	115,070	57.74%	247	0.12%	800	0.4%	0	0%	199,283	100%
Chamba State	155,910	92.3%	12,318	7.29%	107	0.06%	190	0.11%	0	0%	383	0.23%	168,908	100%
Sirmoor State	146,199	93.7%	7,374	4.73%	2,334	1.5%	38	0.02%	81	0.05%	0	0%	156,026	100%
Bilaspur State	108,375	98.22%	1,498	1.36%	453	0.41%	7	0.01%	3	0%	0	0%	110,336	100%
Malerkotla State	23,482	26.65%	33,881	38.45%	30,320	34.41%	116	0.13%	310	0.35%	0	0%	88,109	100%
Suket State	69,974	98.43%	884	1.24%	234	0.33%	0	0%	0	0%	0	0%	71,092	100%
Kalsia State	29,866	44.32%	25,049	37.17%	12,235	18.15%	55	0.08%	188	0.28%	0	0%	67,393	100%
Simla District	29,466	76.38%	7,022	18.2%	1,032	2.68%	934	2.42%	114	0.3%	8	0.02%	38,576	100%
Dujana State	23,727	77.37%	6,939	22.63%	0	0%	0	0%	0	0%	0	0%	30,666	100%
Loharu State	23,923	85.77%	3,960	14.2%	7	0.03%	2	0.01%	0	0%	0	0%	27,892	100%
Pataudi State	17,728	82.38%	3,655	16.98%	0	0%	9	0.04%	128	0.59%	0	0%	21,520	100%
Total	7,963,083	46.95%	5,237,584	30.88%	3,586,073	21.14%	117,155	0.69%	35,955	0.21%	19,908	0.12%	16,959,758	100%
Territory comprises the contemporary subdivisions of Punjab, India, Chandigarh, Haryana, and Himachal Pradesh.

==== Contemporary Punjab state ====
Religions in contemporary Punjab State, India region (1941)
1. Islam (38.4%)
2. Sikhism (33.6%)
3. Hinduism (26.6%)
4. Christianity (1.06%)
5. Jainism (0.13%)
6. Others (0.15%)

The religious demography according to the 1941 census for the region that comprises the contemporary state of Punjab, India is also shown below, broken down by district and princely state with an overall total.

Religion in the Districts & Princely States that comprise the contemporary Punjab State, India region (1941)
District/ Princely State	Islam		Sikhism		Hinduism		Christianity		Jainism		Others		Total	
District/ Princely State	Pop.	%	Pop.	%	Pop.	%	Pop.	%	Pop.	%	Pop.	%	Pop.	%
Patiala State	436,539	22.55%	896,021	46.28%	597,488	30.86%	1,592	0.08%	3,101	0.16%	1,518	0.08%	1,936,259	100%
Firozpur District	641,448	45.07%	479,486	33.69%	287,733	20.22%	12,607	0.89%	1,674	0.12%	128	0.01%	1,423,076	100%
Amritsar District	657,695	46.52%	510,845	36.13%	217,431	15.38%	25,973	1.84%	1,911	0.14%	21	0%	1,413,876	100%
Hoshiarpur District	380,759	32.53%	198,194	16.93%	584,080	49.91%	6,165	0.53%	1,125	0.1%	0	0%	1,170,323	100%
Jalandhar District	509,804	45.23%	298,741	26.5%	311,010	27.59%	6,233	0.55%	1,395	0.12%	7	0%	1,127,190	100%
Gurdaspur District	440,323	51.08%	200,688	24.44%	174,221	20.21%	46,743	5.42%	25	0%	6	0%	862,006	100%
Ludhiana District	302,482	36.95%	341,175	41.68%	171,715	20.98%	1,913	0.23%	1,279	0.16%	51	0.01%	818,615	100%
Kapurthala State	213,754	56.49%	88,350	23.35%	61,546	16.27%	1,667	0.44%	380	0.1%	12,683	3.35%	378,380	100%
Nabha State	70,373	20.45%	122,451	35.59%	146,518	42.59%	221	0.06%	480	0.14%	1	0%	344,044	100%
Faridkot State	61,352	30.79%	115,070	57.74%	21,814	10.95%	247	0.12%	800	0.4%	0	0%	199,283	100%
Malerkotla State	33,881	38.45%	30,320	34.41%	23,482	26.65%	116	0.13%	310	0.35%	0	0%	88,109	100%
Total	3,748,410	38.42%	3,281,341	33.63%	2,597,038	26.62%	103,477	1.06%	12,480	0.13%	14,415	0.15%	9,757,161	100%
Note: Territory roughly comprises the contemporary state of Punjab, India. Certain regions that would ultimately form part of the contemporary state (Kharar and Rupar tehsils, alongside a portion of Kasur Tehsil including Patti, Khemkaran, and 186 surrounding villages) are excluded from the data table above, while certain regions that would ultimately be bifurcated from the contemporary state (Una, Kandaghat, Mahendragarh, and Narwana tehsils) are included in the data table above. The demarcation an reorganization of boundaries in contemporary Punjab state occurred in 1966, officially termed Punjab Reorganisation Act, 1966.

=== 1931 census ===
==== East Punjab region ====
Religions in East Punjab, India region (1931) (Note: 1931 figure taken from census data by combining the total population of all districts (Hisar, Rohtak, Gurgaon, Karnal, Jalandhar, Ludhiana, Firozpur, Amritsar, Simla, Kangra, Ambala, Hoshiarpur, and Gurdaspur (minus Shakargarh Tehsil)), and princely states (Loharu, Dujana, Pataudi, Kalsia, Kapurthala, Malerkotla, Faridkot, Patiala, Jind, Nabha, Sirmoor, Simla Hill, Bilaspur, Mandi, Suket, and Chamba) in Punjab Province, British India that ultimately fell on the eastern side of the Radcliffe Line. See 1931 census data here: Immediately following the partition of India in 1947, these districts and princely states would ultimately make up the subdivision of East Punjab, which also included Patiala and East Punjab States Union, Chief Commissioner's Province of Himachal Pradesh, and Bilaspur State. The states that make up this region in the contemporary era are Punjab, India, Chandigarh, Haryana, and Himachal Pradesh.)
1. Hinduism (48.9%)
2. Islam (30.2%)
3. Sikhism (20.0%)
4. Christianity (0.65%)
5. Jainism (0.25%)
6. Others (0.05%)

Prior to partition, the eastern portion of Punjab that was ultimately awarded to India following the demarcation of the Radcliffe Line was made into a new province – East Punjab. The area includes the contemporary states of Punjab, Haryana, and Himachal Pradesh. Below is the religious demographics of this region broken down by district and princely state with an overall total as per the 1931 Indian census.

Religion in the Districts & Princely States of East Punjab, India region (1931)
District/ Princely State	Hinduism		Islam		Sikhism		Christianity		Jainism		Others		Total	
District/ Princely State	Pop.	%	Pop.	%	Pop.	%	Pop.	%	Pop.	%	Pop.	%	Pop.	%
Patiala State	623,597	38.36%	363,920	22.39%	632,972	38.94%	1,449	0.09%	3,578	0.22%	4	0%	1,625,520	100%
Firozpur District	244,688	21.15%	515,430	44.56%	388,108	33.55%	7,070	0.61%	1,411	0.12%	25	0%	1,156,732	100%
Amritsar District	174,556	15.63%	524,676	46.97%	399,951	35.8%	16,619	1.49%	1,272	0.11%	46	0%	1,117,120	100%
Hoshiarpur District	526,182	50.98%	328,078	31.78%	173,147	16.77%	3,764	0.36%	1,016	0.1%	0	0%	1,032,187	100%
Jalandhar District	268,822	28.49%	419,556	44.46%	249,571	26.45%	4,323	0.46%	1,379	0.15%	70	0.01%	943,721	100%
Hisar District	583,429	64.86%	253,784	28.21%	55,169	6.13%	1,107	0.12%	5,988	0.67%	2	0%	899,479	100%
Karnal District	570,297	66.89%	259,730	30.46%	16,928	1.99%	1,469	0.17%	4,190	0.49%	0	0%	852,614	100%
Rohtak District	655,963	81.42%	137,880	17.11%	596	0.07%	4,807	0.6%	6,375	0.79%	0	0%	805,621	100%
Kangra District	752,098	93.86%	40,483	5.05%	2,396	0.3%	576	0.07%	94	0.01%	5,665	0.71%	801,312	100%
Ambala District	346,809	46.68%	230,837	31.07%	155,555	20.94%	7,141	0.96%	2,550	0.34%	10	0%	742,902	100%
Gurgaon District	493,174	66.63%	242,357	32.74%	500	0.07%	1,463	0.2%	2,665	0.36%	4	0%	740,163	100%
Gurdaspur District	154,631	21.37%	367,388	50.78%	162,741	22.49%	38,756	5.36%	15	0%	4	0%	723,535	100%
Ludhiana District	120,161	17.87%	235,598	35.03%	312,829	46.52%	2,477	0.37%	1,419	0.21%	10	0%	672,494	100%
Simla Hill States	317,390	95.93%	10,017	3.03%	1,817	0.55%	176	0.05%	141	0.04%	1,309	0.4%	330,850	100%
Jind State	243,561	75.02%	46,002	14.17%	33,290	10.25%	210	0.06%	1,613	0.5%	0	0%	324,676	100%
Kapurthala State	64,319	20.31%	179,251	56.59%	72,177	22.79%	983	0.31%	27	0.01%	0	0%	316,757	100%
Nabha State	132,354	46.02%	57,393	19.96%	97,452	33.89%	66	0.02%	309	0.11%	0	0%	287,574	100%
Mandi State	199,935	96.37%	6,351	3.06%	899	0.43%	141	0.07%	0	0%	139	0.07%	207,465	100%
Faridkot State	20,855	12.69%	49,912	30.37%	92,880	56.51%	167	0.1%	550	0.33%	0	0%	164,364	100%
Sirmoor State	139,031	93.58%	7,020	4.73%	2,413	1.62%	52	0.04%	52	0.04%	0	0%	148,568	100%
Chamba State	135,254	92.09%	10,839	7.38%	112	0.08%	94	0.06%	3	0%	568	0.39%	146,870	100%
Bilaspur State	99,023	98.05%	1,458	1.44%	507	0.5%	6	0.01%	0	0%	0	0%	100,994	100%
Malerkotla State	21,252	25.58%	31,417	37.82%	28,982	34.89%	135	0.16%	1,286	1.55%	0	0%	83,072	100%
Kalsia State	28,832	48.18%	21,797	36.42%	9,035	15.1%	22	0.04%	162	0.27%	0	0%	59,848	100%
Suket State	57,616	98.64%	733	1.25%	44	0.08%	1	0%	0	0%	14	0.02%	58,408	100%
Simla District	28,661	77.91%	5,810	15.79%	760	2.07%	1,540	4.19%	1	0%	14	0.04%	36,786	100%
Dujana State	22,347	79.2%	5,863	20.78%	1	0%	5	0.02%	0	0%	0	0%	28,216	100%
Loharu State	20,198	86.55%	3,119	13.36%	2	0.01%	1	0%	18	0.08%	0	0%	23,338	100%
Pataudi State	15,596	82.64%	3,168	16.79%	1	0.01%	3	0.02%	105	0.56%	0	0%	18,873	100%
Total	7,060,631	48.86%	4,359,867	30.17%	2,890,835	20.01%	94,623	0.65%	36,219	0.25%	7,884	0.05%	14,450,059	100%
Territory comprises the contemporary subdivisions of Punjab, India, Chandigarh, Haryana, and Himachal Pradesh.

==== Contemporary Punjab state ====
Religions in contemporary Punjab State, India region (1931)
1. Islam (37.8%)
2. Sikhism (32.1%)
3. Hinduism (28.9%)
4. Christianity (0.93%)
5. Jainism (0.15%)
6. Others (0.00%)

The religious demography according to the 1931 census for the region that comprises the contemporary state of Punjab, India is also shown below, broken down by district and princely state with an overall total.

Religion in the Districts & Princely States that comprise the contemporary Punjab State, India region (1931)
District/ Princely State	Islam		Sikhism		Hinduism		Christianity		Jainism		Others		Total	
District/ Princely State	Pop.	%	Pop.	%	Pop.	%	Pop.	%	Pop.	%	Pop.	%	Pop.	%
Patiala State	363,920	22.39%	632,972	38.94%	623,597	38.36%	1,449	0.09%	3,578	0.22%	4	0%	1,625,520	100%
Firozpur District	515,430	44.56%	388,108	33.55%	244,688	21.15%	7,070	0.61%	1,411	0.12%	25	0%	1,156,732	100%
Amritsar District	524,676	46.97%	399,951	35.8%	174,556	15.63%	16,619	1.49%	1,272	0.11%	46	0%	1,117,120	100%
Hoshiarpur District	328,078	31.78%	173,147	16.77%	526,182	50.98%	3,764	0.36%	1,016	0.1%	0	0%	1,032,187	100%
Jalandhar District	419,556	44.46%	249,571	26.45%	268,822	28.49%	4,323	0.46%	1,379	0.15%	70	0.01%	943,721	100%
Gurdaspur District	367,388	50.78%	162,741	22.49%	154,631	21.37%	38,756	5.36%	15	0%	4	0%	723,535	100%
Ludhiana District	235,598	35.03%	312,829	46.52%	120,161	17.87%	2,477	0.37%	1,419	0.21%	10	0%	672,494	100%
Kapurthala State	179,251	56.59%	72,177	22.79%	64,319	20.31%	983	0.31%	27	0.01%	0	0%	316,757	100%
Nabha State	57,393	19.96%	97,452	33.89%	132,354	46.02%	66	0.02%	309	0.11%	0	0%	287,574	100%
Faridkot State	49,912	30.37%	92,880	56.51%	20,855	12.69%	167	0.1%	550	0.33%	0	0%	164,364	100%
Malerkotla State	31,417	37.82%	28,982	34.89%	21,252	25.58%	135	0.16%	1,286	1.55%	0	0%	83,072	100%
Total	3,072,619	37.83%	2,610,810	32.14%	2,351,417	28.95%	75,809	0.93%	12,262	0.15%	159	0.002%	8,123,076	100%
Note: Territory roughly comprises the contemporary state of Punjab, India. Certain regions that would ultimately form part of the contemporary state (Kharar and Rupar tehsils, alongside a portion of Kasur Tehsil including Patti, Khemkaran, and 186 surrounding villages) are excluded from the data table above, while certain regions that would ultimately be bifurcated from the contemporary state (Una, Kandaghat, Mahendragarh, and Narwana tehsils) are included in the data table above. The demarcation an reorganization of boundaries in contemporary Punjab state occurred in 1966, officially termed Punjab Reorganisation Act, 1966.

=== 1921 census ===
==== East Punjab region ====
Religions in East Punjab, India region (1921) (Note: 1921 figure taken from census data by combining the total population of all districts (Hisar, Rohtak, Gurgaon, Karnal, Jalandhar, Ludhiana, Firozpur, Amritsar, Simla, Kangra, Ambala, Hoshiarpur, and Gurdaspur (minus Shakargarh Tehsil)), and princely states (Loharu, Dujana, Pataudi, Kalsia, Kapurthala, Malerkotla, Faridkot, Patiala, Jind, Nabha, Nahan, Simla Hill, Bilaspur, Mandi, Suket, and Chamba) in Punjab Province, British India that ultimately fell on the eastern side of the Radcliffe Line. See 1921 census data here: Immediately following the partition of India in 1947, these districts and princely states would ultimately make up the subdivision of East Punjab, which also included Patiala and East Punjab States Union, Chief Commissioner's Province of Himachal Pradesh, and Bilaspur State. The states that make up this region in the contemporary era are Punjab, India, Chandigarh, Haryana, and Himachal Pradesh.)
1. Hinduism (53.0%)
2. Islam (29.1%)
3. Sikhism (17.0%)
4. Christianity (0.65%)
5. Jainism (0.27%)
6. Others (0.05%)

Prior to partition, the eastern portion of Punjab that was ultimately awarded to India following the demarcation of the Radcliffe Line was made into a new province – East Punjab. The area includes the contemporary states of Punjab, Haryana, and Himachal Pradesh. Below is the religious demographics of this region broken down by district and princely state with an overall total as per the 1921 Indian census.

Religion in the Districts & Princely States of East Punjab, India region (1921)
District/ Princely State	Hinduism		Islam		Sikhism		Christianity		Jainism		Others		Total	
District/ Princely State	Pop.	%	Pop.	%	Pop.	%	Pop.	%	Pop.	%	Pop.	%	Pop.	%
Patiala State	642,055	42.81%	330,341	22.03%	522,675	34.85%	1,395	0.09%	3,249	0.22%	24	0%	1,499,739	100%
Firozpur District	306,350	27.89%	482,540	43.94%	302,761	27.57%	5,365	0.49%	1,211	0.11%	21	0%	1,098,248	100%
Amritsar District	204,435	22%	423,724	45.59%	287,004	30.88%	12,773	1.37%	1,375	0.15%	63	0.01%	929,374	100%
Hoshiarpur District	500,339	53.95%	289,298	31.19%	132,958	14.34%	3,745	0.4%	1,079	0.12%	0	0%	927,419	100%
Karnal District	573,224	69.17%	235,618	28.43%	12,280	1.48%	3,382	0.41%	4,222	0.51%	0	0%	828,726	100%
Jalandhar District	244,995	29.79%	366,586	44.57%	206,130	25.06%	4,088	0.5%	736	0.09%	9	0%	822,544	100%
Hisar District	548,351	67.13%	215,943	26.44%	45,615	5.58%	1,024	0.13%	5,874	0.72%	3	0%	816,810	100%
Rohtak District	629,592	81.52%	125,035	16.19%	602	0.08%	10,033	1.3%	7,010	0.91%	0	0%	772,272	100%
Kangra District	722,277	94.28%	38,263	4.99%	2,083	0.27%	363	0.05%	56	0.01%	3,023	0.39%	766,065	100%
Gurgaon District	460,134	67.47%	216,860	31.8%	924	0.14%	1,316	0.19%	2,762	0.4%	7	0%	682,003	100%
Ambala District	370,125	54.31%	205,750	30.19%	97,614	14.32%	5,679	0.83%	2,272	0.33%	37	0.01%	681,477	100%
Gurdaspur District	168,178	26.3%	316,709	49.54%	125,322	19.6%	29,099	4.55%	20	0%	15	0%	639,343	100%
Ludhiana District	135,512	23.87%	192,961	33.99%	235,721	41.53%	1,613	0.28%	1,796	0.32%	19	0%	567,622	100%
Jind State	234,721	76.16%	43,251	14.03%	28,026	9.09%	637	0.21%	1,548	0.5%	0	0%	308,183	100%
Simla Hill States	292,768	95.45%	9,551	3.11%	2,040	0.67%	164	0.05%	142	0.05%	2,053	0.67%	306,718	100%
Kapurthala State	58,412	20.55%	160,457	56.44%	64,074	22.54%	1,100	0.39%	228	0.08%	4	0%	284,275	100%
Nabha State	133,870	50.84%	50,756	19.27%	78,389	29.77%	41	0.02%	278	0.11%	0	0%	263,334	100%
Mandi State	181,358	98.01%	3,462	1.87%	142	0.08%	10	0.01%	0	0%	76	0.04%	185,048	100%
Faridkot State	38,610	25.63%	44,813	29.74%	66,658	44.24%	107	0.07%	473	0.31%	0	0%	150,661	100%
Chamba State	130,489	91.98%	10,529	7.42%	242	0.17%	63	0.04%	3	0%	541	0.38%	141,867	100%
Nahan State	132,431	94.29%	6,449	4.59%	1,449	1.03%	44	0.03%	65	0.05%	10	0.01%	140,448	100%
Bilaspur State	96,000	97.96%	1,559	1.59%	437	0.45%	4	0%	0	0%	0	0%	98,000	100%
Malerkotla State	29,459	36.68%	28,413	35.37%	21,828	27.18%	37	0.05%	585	0.73%	0	0%	80,322	100%
Kalsia State	28,769	50.15%	20,394	35.55%	8,014	13.97%	4	0.01%	190	0.33%	0	0%	57,371	100%
Suket State	53,625	98.71%	659	1.21%	44	0.08%	0	0%	0	0%	0	0%	54,328	100%
Simla District	33,228	73.31%	6,953	15.34%	1,173	2.59%	3,823	8.43%	90	0.2%	60	0.13%	45,327	100%
Dujana State	20,135	77.94%	5,698	22.06%	0	0%	0	0%	0	0%	0	0%	25,833	100%
Loharu State	17,978	87.18%	2,625	12.73%	0	0%	0	0%	18	0.09%	0	0%	20,621	100%
Pataudi State	15,090	83.38%	2,898	16.01%	0	0%	0	0%	109	0.6%	0	0%	18,097	100%
Total	7,002,510	53%	3,838,095	29.05%	2,244,205	16.99%	85,909	0.65%	35,391	0.27%	5,965	0.05%	13,212,075	100%
Territory comprises the contemporary subdivisions of Punjab, India, Chandigarh, Haryana, and Himachal Pradesh.

==== Contemporary Punjab state ====
Religions in contemporary Punjab State, India region (1921)
1. Islam (37.0%)
2. Hinduism (33.9%)
3. Sikhism (28.1%)
4. Christianity (0.82%)
5. Jainism (0.15%)
6. Others (0.00%)

The religious demography according to the 1921 census for the region that comprises the contemporary state of Punjab, India is also shown below, broken down by district and princely state with an overall total.

Religion in the Districts & Princely States that comprise the contemporary Punjab State, India region (1921)
District/ Princely State	Islam		Hinduism		Sikhism		Christianity		Jainism		Others		Total	
District/ Princely State	Pop.	%	Pop.	%	Pop.	%	Pop.	%	Pop.	%	Pop.	%	Pop.	%
Patiala State	330,341	22.03%	642,055	42.81%	522,675	34.85%	1,395	0.09%	3,249	0.22%	24	0%	1,499,739	100%
Firozpur District	482,540	43.94%	306,350	27.89%	302,761	27.57%	5,365	0.49%	1,211	0.11%	21	0%	1,098,248	100%
Amritsar District	423,724	45.59%	204,435	22%	287,004	30.88%	12,773	1.37%	1,375	0.15%	63	0.01%	929,374	100%
Hoshiarpur District	289,298	31.19%	500,339	53.95%	132,958	14.34%	3,745	0.4%	1,079	0.12%	0	0%	927,419	100%
Jalandhar District	366,586	44.57%	244,995	29.79%	206,130	25.06%	4,088	0.5%	736	0.09%	9	0%	822,544	100%
Gurdaspur District	316,709	49.54%	168,178	26.3%	125,322	19.6%	29,099	4.55%	20	0%	15	0%	639,343	100%
Ludhiana District	192,961	33.99%	135,512	23.87%	235,721	41.53%	1,613	0.28%	1,796	0.32%	19	0%	567,622	100%
Kapurthala State	160,457	56.44%	58,412	20.55%	64,074	22.54%	1,100	0.39%	228	0.08%	4	0%	284,275	100%
Nabha State	50,756	19.27%	133,870	50.84%	78,389	29.77%	41	0.02%	278	0.11%	0	0%	263,334	100%
Faridkot State	44,813	29.74%	38,610	25.63%	66,658	44.24%	107	0.07%	473	0.31%	0	0%	150,661	100%
Malerkotla State	28,413	35.37%	29,459	36.68%	21,828	27.18%	37	0.05%	585	0.73%	0	0%	80,322	100%
Total	2,686,598	36.99%	2,462,215	33.9%	2,043,520	28.14%	59,363	0.82%	11,030	0.15%	155	0.002%	7,262,881	100%
Note: Territory roughly comprises the contemporary state of Punjab, India. Certain regions that would ultimately form part of the contemporary state (Kharar and Rupar tehsils, alongside a portion of Kasur Tehsil including Patti, Khemkaran, and 186 surrounding villages) are excluded from the data table above, while certain regions that would ultimately be bifurcated from the contemporary state (Una, Kandaghat, Mahendragarh, and Narwana tehsils) are included in the data table above. The demarcation an reorganization of boundaries in contemporary Punjab state occurred in 1966, officially termed Punjab Reorganisation Act, 1966.

=== 1911 census ===
==== East Punjab region ====
Religions in East Punjab, India region (1911) (Note: 1911 figure taken from census data by combining the total population of all districts (Hisar, Rohtak, Gurgaon, Delhi, Karnal, Jalandhar, Ludhiana, Firozpur, Amritsar, Simla, Kangra, Ambala, Hoshiarpur, and Gurdaspur (minus Shakargarh Tehsil)), and princely states (Loharu, Dujana, Pataudi, Kalsia, Kapurthala, Malerkotla, Faridkot, Patiala, Jind, Nabha, Nahan, Simla Hill, Mandi, Suket, and Chamba) in Punjab Province, British India that ultimately fell on the eastern side of the Radcliffe Line. See 1911 census data here: Immediately following the partition of India in 1947, these districts and princely states would ultimately make up the subdivision of East Punjab, which also included Patiala and East Punjab States Union, Chief Commissioner's Province of Himachal Pradesh, and Bilaspur State. The states that make up this region in the contemporary era are Punjab, India, Chandigarh, Haryana, and Himachal Pradesh.)
1. Hinduism (54.5%)
2. Islam (28.9%)
3. Sikhism (15.8%)
4. Christianity (0.42%)
5. Jainism (0.31%)
6. Others (0.06%)

Prior to partition, the eastern portion of Punjab that was ultimately awarded to India following the demarcation of the Radcliffe Line was made into a new province – East Punjab. The area includes the contemporary states of Punjab, Haryana, and Himachal Pradesh. Below is the religious demographics of this region broken down by district and princely state with an overall total as per the 1911 Indian census.

Religion in the Districts & Princely States of East Punjab, India region (1911)
District/ Princely State	Hinduism		Islam		Sikhism		Christianity		Jainism		Others		Total	
District/ Princely State	Pop.	%	Pop.	%	Pop.	%	Pop.	%	Pop.	%	Pop.	%	Pop.	%
Patiala State	563,940	40.06%	307,384	21.84%	532,292	37.81%	739	0.05%	3,282	0.23%	22	0%	1,407,659	100%
Firozpur District	273,832	28.53%	418,553	43.61%	262,511	27.35%	3,342	0.35%	1,401	0.15%	18	0%	959,657	100%
Hoshiarpur District	498,642	54.28%	281,805	30.68%	134,146	14.6%	2,978	0.32%	998	0.11%	0	0%	918,569	100%
Amritsar District	211,708	24.04%	408,882	46.43%	253,941	28.83%	4,763	0.54%	1,386	0.16%	48	0.01%	880,728	100%
Hisar District	541,720	67.3%	218,600	27.16%	38,508	4.78%	273	0.03%	5,767	0.72%	21	0%	804,889	100%
Jalandhar District	265,378	33.09%	357,051	44.52%	176,227	21.98%	2,404	0.3%	842	0.1%	18	0%	801,920	100%
Karnal District	556,203	69.54%	224,920	28.12%	13,531	1.69%	920	0.12%	4,213	0.53%	0	0%	799,787	100%
Kangra District	725,156	94.13%	38,859	5.04%	1,910	0.25%	386	0.05%	81	0.01%	3,994	0.52%	770,386	100%
Rohtak District	450,549	83.21%	86,076	15.9%	161	0.03%	334	0.06%	4,369	0.81%	0	0%	541,489	100%
Ambala District	380,592	55.16%	205,203	29.74%	94,471	13.69%	7,483	1.08%	2,187	0.32%	34	0%	689,970	100%
Delhi District	469,561	71.4%	171,745	26.12%	2,985	0.45%	5,693	0.87%	7,539	1.15%	81	0.01%	657,604	100%
Gurgaon District	421,885	65.59%	217,237	33.78%	342	0.05%	782	0.12%	2,921	0.45%	10	0%	643,177	100%
Gurdaspur District	190,965	30.49%	304,860	48.67%	110,525	17.65%	19,879	3.17%	73	0.01%	22	0%	626,324	100%
Ludhiana District	131,370	25.4%	176,043	34.04%	207,042	40.03%	888	0.17%	1,849	0.36%	0	0%	517,192	100%
Simla Hill States	386,953	95.7%	11,374	2.81%	2,911	0.72%	224	0.06%	172	0.04%	2,709	0.67%	404,343	100%
Jind State	210,222	77.36%	37,520	13.81%	22,566	8.3%	187	0.07%	1,233	0.45%	0	0%	271,728	100%
Kapurthala State	61,426	22.91%	152,117	56.73%	54,275	20.24%	107	0.04%	205	0.08%	3	0%	268,133	100%
Nabha State	126,414	50.79%	46,032	18.5%	76,198	30.62%	5	0%	238	0.1%	0	0%	248,887	100%
Mandi State	178,115	98.35%	2,799	1.55%	26	0.01%	4	0%	2	0%	164	0.09%	181,110	100%
Nahan State	130,276	94.05%	6,016	4.34%	2,142	1.55%	37	0.03%	49	0.04%	0	0%	138,520	100%
Chamba State	126,269	92.93%	8,750	6.44%	141	0.1%	81	0.06%	5	0%	627	0.46%	135,873	100%
Faridkot State	37,377	28.69%	37,105	28.48%	55,397	42.52%	6	0%	409	0.31%	0	0%	130,294	100%
Malerkotla State	22,902	32.19%	25,942	36.46%	21,018	29.54%	14	0.02%	1,268	1.78%	0	0%	71,144	100%
Kalsia State	30,640	54.8%	18,820	33.66%	6,258	11.19%	31	0.06%	160	0.29%	0	0%	55,909	100%
Suket State	54,268	98.8%	587	1.07%	71	0.13%	2	0%	0	0%	0	0%	54,928	100%
Simla District	29,047	73.87%	5,820	14.8%	693	1.76%	3,666	9.32%	49	0.12%	45	0.11%	39,320	100%
Dujana State	20,161	79.11%	5,324	20.89%	0	0%	0	0%	0	0%	0	0%	25,485	100%
Pataudi State	16,114	82.45%	3,338	17.08%	0	0%	9	0.05%	82	0.42%	0	0%	19,543	100%
Loharu State	16,178	86.99%	2,401	12.91%	0	0%	0	0%	18	0.1%	0	0%	18,597	100%
Total	7,127,863	54.48%	3,781,163	28.9%	2,070,288	15.82%	55,237	0.42%	40,798	0.31%	7,816	0.06%	13,083,165	100%
Territory comprises the contemporary subdivisions of Punjab, India, Chandigarh, Haryana, Delhi, and Himachal Pradesh.

==== Contemporary Punjab state ====
Religions in contemporary Punjab State, India region (1911)
1. Islam (36.8%)
2. Hinduism (34.9%)
3. Sikhism (27.6%)
4. Christianity (0.51%)
5. Jainism (0.17%)
6. Others (0.00%)

The religious demography according to the 1911 census for the region that comprises the contemporary state of Punjab, India is also shown below, broken down by district and princely state with an overall total.

Religion in the Districts & Princely States that comprise the contemporary Punjab State, India region (1911)
District/ Princely State	Islam		Hinduism		Sikhism		Christianity		Jainism		Others		Total	
District/ Princely State	Pop.	%	Pop.	%	Pop.	%	Pop.	%	Pop.	%	Pop.	%	Pop.	%
Patiala State	307,384	21.84%	563,940	40.06%	532,292	37.81%	739	0.05%	3,282	0.23%	22	0%	1,407,659	100%
Firozpur District	418,553	43.61%	273,832	28.53%	262,511	27.35%	3,342	0.35%	1,401	0.15%	18	0%	959,657	100%
Hoshiarpur District	281,805	30.68%	498,642	54.28%	134,146	14.6%	2,978	0.32%	998	0.11%	0	0%	918,569	100%
Amritsar District	408,882	46.43%	211,708	24.04%	253,941	28.83%	4,763	0.54%	1,386	0.16%	48	0.01%	880,728	100%
Jalandhar District	357,051	44.52%	265,378	33.09%	176,227	21.98%	2,404	0.3%	842	0.1%	18	0%	801,920	100%
Gurdaspur District	304,860	48.67%	190,965	30.49%	110,525	17.65%	19,879	3.17%	73	0.01%	22	0%	626,324	100%
Ludhiana District	176,043	34.04%	131,370	25.4%	207,042	40.03%	888	0.17%	1,849	0.36%	0	0%	517,192	100%
Kapurthala State	152,117	56.73%	61,426	22.91%	54,275	20.24%	107	0.04%	205	0.08%	3	0%	268,133	100%
Nabha State	46,032	18.5%	126,414	50.79%	76,198	30.62%	5	0%	238	0.1%	0	0%	248,887	100%
Faridkot State	37,105	28.48%	37,377	28.69%	55,397	42.52%	6	0%	409	0.31%	0	0%	130,294	100%
Malerkotla State	25,942	36.46%	22,902	32.19%	21,018	29.54%	14	0.02%	1,268	1.78%	0	0%	71,144	100%
Total	2,515,774	36.83%	2,383,954	34.9%	1,883,572	27.58%	35,125	0.51%	11,951	0.17%	131	0.002%	6,830,507	100%
Note: Territory roughly comprises the contemporary state of Punjab, India. Certain regions that would ultimately form part of the contemporary state (Kharar and Rupar tehsils, alongside a portion of Kasur Tehsil including Patti, Khemkaran, and 186 surrounding villages) are excluded from the data table above, while certain regions that would ultimately be bifurcated from the contemporary state (Una, Kandaghat, Mahendragarh, and Narwana tehsils) are included in the data table above. The demarcation an reorganization of boundaries in contemporary Punjab state occurred in 1966, officially termed Punjab Reorganisation Act, 1966.

=== 1901 census ===
==== East Punjab region ====
Religions in East Punjab, India region (1901) (Note: 1901 figure taken from census data by combining the total population of all districts (Hisar, Rohtak, Gurgaon, Delhi, Karnal, Jalandhar, Ludhiana, Firozpur, Amritsar, Simla, Kangra, Ambala, Hoshiarpur, and Gurdaspur (minus Shakargarh Tehsil)), and princely states (Loharu, Dujana, Pataudi, Kalsia, Kapurthala, Malerkotla, Faridkot, Patiala, Jind, Nabha, Nahan, Simla Hill, Mandi, Suket, and Chamba) in Punjab Province, British India that ultimately fell on the eastern side of the Radcliffe Line. See 1901 census data here: Immediately following the partition of India in 1947, these districts and princely states would ultimately make up the subdivision of East Punjab, which also included Patiala and East Punjab States Union, Chief Commissioner's Province of Himachal Pradesh, and Bilaspur State. The states that make up this region in the contemporary era are Punjab, India, Chandigarh, Haryana, and Himachal Pradesh.)
1. Hinduism (58.6%)
2. Islam (29.5%)
3. Sikhism (11.3%)
4. Jainism (0.31%)
5. Christianity (0.17%)
6. Others (0.05%)

Prior to partition, the eastern portion of Punjab that was ultimately awarded to India following the demarcation of the Radcliffe Line was made into a new province – East Punjab. The area includes the contemporary states of Punjab, Haryana, and Himachal Pradesh. Below is the religious demographics of this region broken down by district and princely state with an overall total as per the 1901 Indian census.

Religion in the Districts & Princely States of East Punjab, India region (1901)
District/ Princely State	Hinduism		Islam		Sikhism		Jainism		Christianity		Others		Total	
District/ Princely State	Pop.	%	Pop.	%	Pop.	%	Pop.	%	Pop.	%	Pop.	%	Pop.	%
Patiala State	880,490	55.14%	357,334	22.38%	355,649	22.27%	2,877	0.18%	316	0.02%	26	0%	1,596,692	100%
Amritsar District	280,985	27.44%	474,976	46.39%	264,329	25.82%	1,439	0.14%	2,078	0.2%	21	0%	1,023,828	100%
Hoshiarpur District	603,710	60.99%	312,958	31.62%	71,126	7.19%	1,173	0.12%	813	0.08%	2	0%	989,782	100%
Firozpur District	279,099	29.13%	447,615	46.72%	228,355	23.83%	1,090	0.11%	1,908	0.2%	5	0%	958,072	100%
Jalandhar District	368,051	40.11%	421,011	45.88%	125,817	13.71%	969	0.11%	1,713	0.19%	26	0%	917,587	100%
Karnal District	623,597	70.6%	241,412	27.33%	12,294	1.39%	4,739	0.54%	1,179	0.13%	4	0%	883,225	100%
Ambala District	510,105	62.52%	240,710	29.5%	58,073	7.12%	2,614	0.32%	4,362	0.53%	16	0%	815,880	100%
Hisar District	544,799	69.69%	202,009	25.84%	28,642	3.66%	6,003	0.77%	253	0.03%	11	0%	781,717	100%
Kangra District	722,554	94.07%	39,672	5.16%	1,220	0.16%	113	0.01%	385	0.05%	4,180	0.54%	768,124	100%
Gurgaon District	499,373	66.92%	242,548	32.5%	99	0.01%	3,909	0.52%	278	0.04%	1	0%	746,208	100%
Gurdaspur District	268,817	38.08%	348,182	49.33%	85,199	12.07%	72	0.01%	3,571	0.51%	28	0%	705,869	100%
Delhi District	510,532	74.09%	167,290	24.28%	294	0.04%	7,726	1.12%	3,158	0.46%	39	0.01%	689,039	100%
Ludhiana District	269,076	39.98%	235,937	35.05%	164,919	24.5%	2,217	0.33%	947	0.14%	1	0%	673,097	100%
Rohtak District	533,723	84.63%	91,687	14.54%	94	0.01%	5,087	0.81%	80	0.01%	1	0%	630,672	100%
Simla Hill States	373,886	96.03%	11,535	2.96%	1,318	0.34%	274	0.07%	113	0.03%	2,223	0.57%	389,349	100%
Kapurthala State	93,652	29.79%	178,326	56.73%	42,101	13.39%	226	0.07%	39	0.01%	7	0%	314,351	100%
Nabha State	160,553	53.89%	58,550	19.65%	78,361	26.3%	476	0.16%	7	0%	2	0%	297,949	100%
Jind State	211,963	75.16%	38,717	13.73%	29,975	10.63%	1,258	0.45%	80	0.03%	10	0%	282,003	100%
Mandi State	170,304	97.85%	3,187	1.83%	41	0.02%	0	0%	3	0%	510	0.29%	174,045	100%
Nahan State	128,478	94.69%	6,414	4.73%	688	0.51%	61	0.04%	46	0.03%	0	0%	135,687	100%
Chamba State	119,327	93.35%	8,332	6.52%	80	0.06%	3	0%	70	0.05%	22	0.02%	127,834	100%
Faridkot State	35,778	28.64%	35,996	28.82%	52,721	42.21%	406	0.33%	11	0.01%	0	0%	124,912	100%
Malerkotla State	38,409	49.56%	27,229	35.13%	10,495	13.54%	1,361	1.76%	12	0.02%	0	0%	77,506	100%
Kalsia State	38,626	57.5%	21,921	32.63%	6,453	9.61%	181	0.27%	0	0%	0	0%	67,181	100%
Suket State	54,005	98.77%	665	1.22%	6	0.01%	0	0%	0	0%	0	0%	54,676	100%
Simla District	30,299	75.09%	6,675	16.54%	544	1.35%	32	0.08%	2,798	6.93%	3	0.01%	40,351	100%
Dujana State	18,380	76.03%	5,790	23.95%	4	0.02%	0	0%	0	0%	0	0%	24,174	100%
Pataudi State	18,281	83.35%	3,549	16.18%	0	0%	103	0.47%	0	0%	0	0%	21,933	100%
Loharu State	13,254	87.03%	1,963	12.89%	0	0%	12	0.08%	0	0%	0	0%	15,229	100%
Total	8,400,106	58.63%	4,232,190	29.54%	1,618,897	11.3%	44,421	0.31%	24,220	0.17%	7,138	0.05%	14,326,972	100%
Territory comprises the contemporary subdivisions of Punjab, India, Chandigarh, Haryana, Delhi, and Himachal Pradesh.

==== Contemporary Punjab state ====
Religions in contemporary Punjab State, India region (1901)
1. Hinduism (42.7%)
2. Islam (37.7%)
3. Sikhism (19.3%)
4. Jainism (0.16%)
5. Christianity (0.15%)
6. Others (0.00%)

The religious demography according to the 1901 census for the region that comprises the contemporary state of Punjab, India is also shown below, broken down by district and princely state with an overall total.

Religion in the Districts & Princely States that comprise the contemporary Punjab State, India region (1901)
District/ Princely State	Hinduism		Islam		Sikhism		Jainism		Christianity		Others		Total	
District/ Princely State	Pop.	%	Pop.	%	Pop.	%	Pop.	%	Pop.	%	Pop.	%	Pop.	%
Patiala State	880,490	55.14%	357,334	22.38%	355,649	22.27%	2,877	0.18%	316	0.02%	26	0%	1,596,692	100%
Amritsar District	280,985	27.44%	474,976	46.39%	264,329	25.82%	1,439	0.14%	2,078	0.2%	21	0%	1,023,828	100%
Hoshiarpur District	603,710	60.99%	312,958	31.62%	71,126	7.19%	1,173	0.12%	813	0.08%	2	0%	989,782	100%
Firozpur District	279,099	29.13%	447,615	46.72%	228,355	23.83%	1,090	0.11%	1,908	0.2%	5	0%	958,072	100%
Jalandhar District	368,051	40.11%	421,011	45.88%	125,817	13.71%	969	0.11%	1,713	0.19%	26	0%	917,587	100%
Gurdaspur District	268,817	38.08%	348,182	49.33%	85,199	12.07%	72	0.01%	3,571	0.51%	28	0%	705,869	100%
Ludhiana District	269,076	39.98%	235,937	35.05%	164,919	24.5%	2,217	0.33%	947	0.14%	1	0%	673,097	100%
Kapurthala State	93,652	29.79%	178,326	56.73%	42,101	13.39%	226	0.07%	39	0.01%	7	0%	314,351	100%
Nabha State	160,553	53.89%	58,550	19.65%	78,361	26.3%	476	0.16%	7	0%	2	0%	297,949	100%
Faridkot State	35,778	28.64%	35,996	28.82%	52,721	42.21%	406	0.33%	11	0.01%	0	0%	124,912	100%
Malerkotla State	38,409	49.56%	27,229	35.13%	10,495	13.54%	1,361	1.76%	12	0.02%	0	0%	77,506	100%
Total	3,278,620	42.69%	2,898,114	37.74%	1,479,072	19.26%	12,306	0.16%	11,415	0.15%	118	0.002%	7,679,645	100%
Note: Territory roughly comprises the contemporary state of Punjab, India. Certain regions that would ultimately form part of the contemporary state (Kharar and Rupar tehsils, alongside a portion of Kasur Tehsil including Patti, Khemkaran, and 186 surrounding villages) are excluded from the data table above, while certain regions that would ultimately be bifurcated from the contemporary state (Una, Kandaghat, Mahendragarh, and Narwana tehsils) are included in the data table above. The demarcation an reorganization of boundaries in contemporary Punjab state occurred in 1966, officially termed Punjab Reorganisation Act, 1966.

== Sikhism in Punjab ==
Decadal Sikh Population in Punjab, India
Year	Pop.	±% p.a.
1901	1,479,072	—
1911	1,883,572	+2.45%
1921	2,043,520	+0.82%
1931	2,610,810	+2.48%
1941	3,281,341	+2.31%
1951	5,553,918	+5.40%
1961	6,178,516	+1.07%
1971	8,160,232	+2.82%
1981	10,199,534	+2.26%
1991	12,768,393	+2.27%
2001	14,592,868	+1.34%
2011	16,004,754	+0.93%
Source: census of India

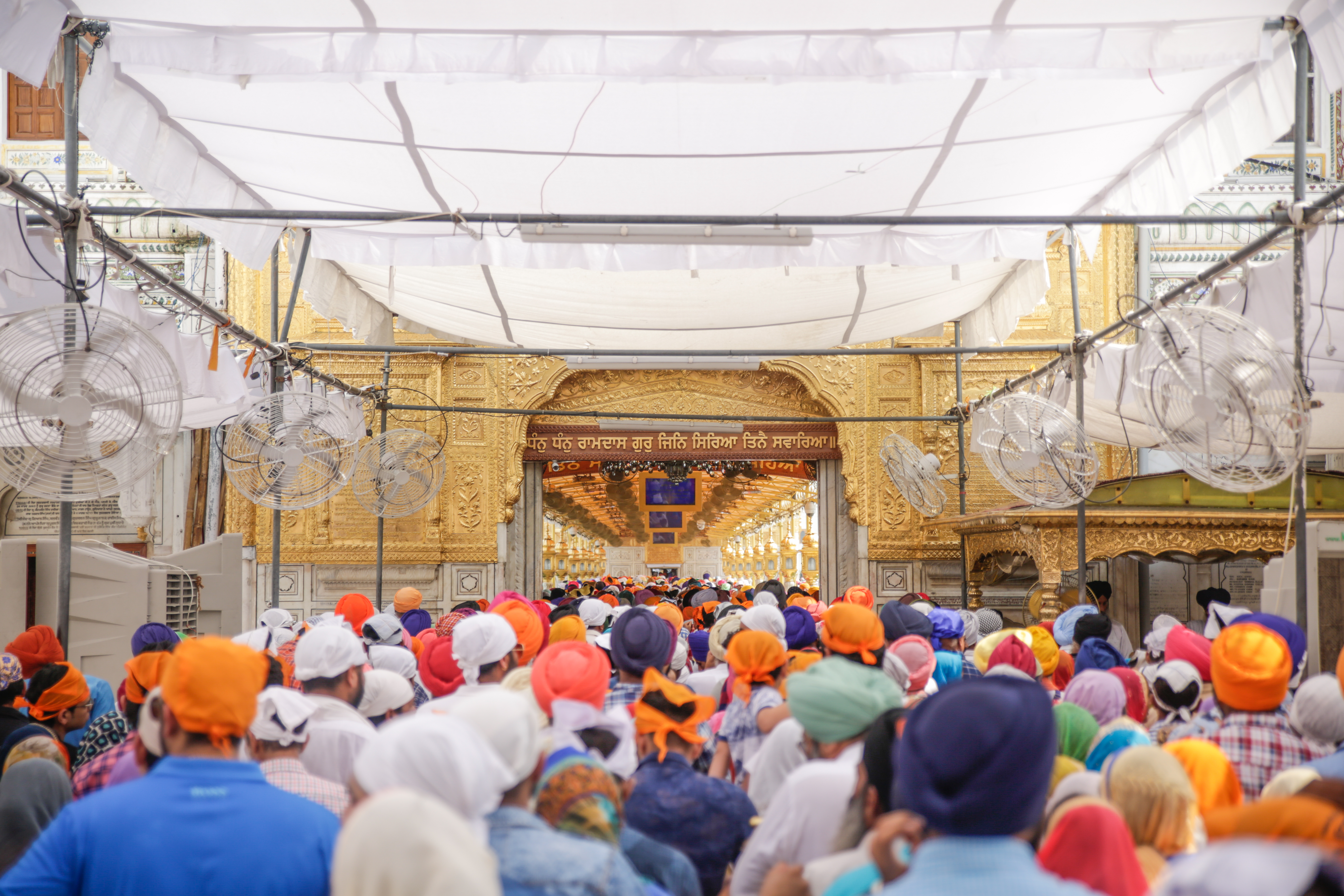
Sikh pilgrims at the causeway to the sanctum of the Harmandir Sahib, the holiest Sikh Gurdwara

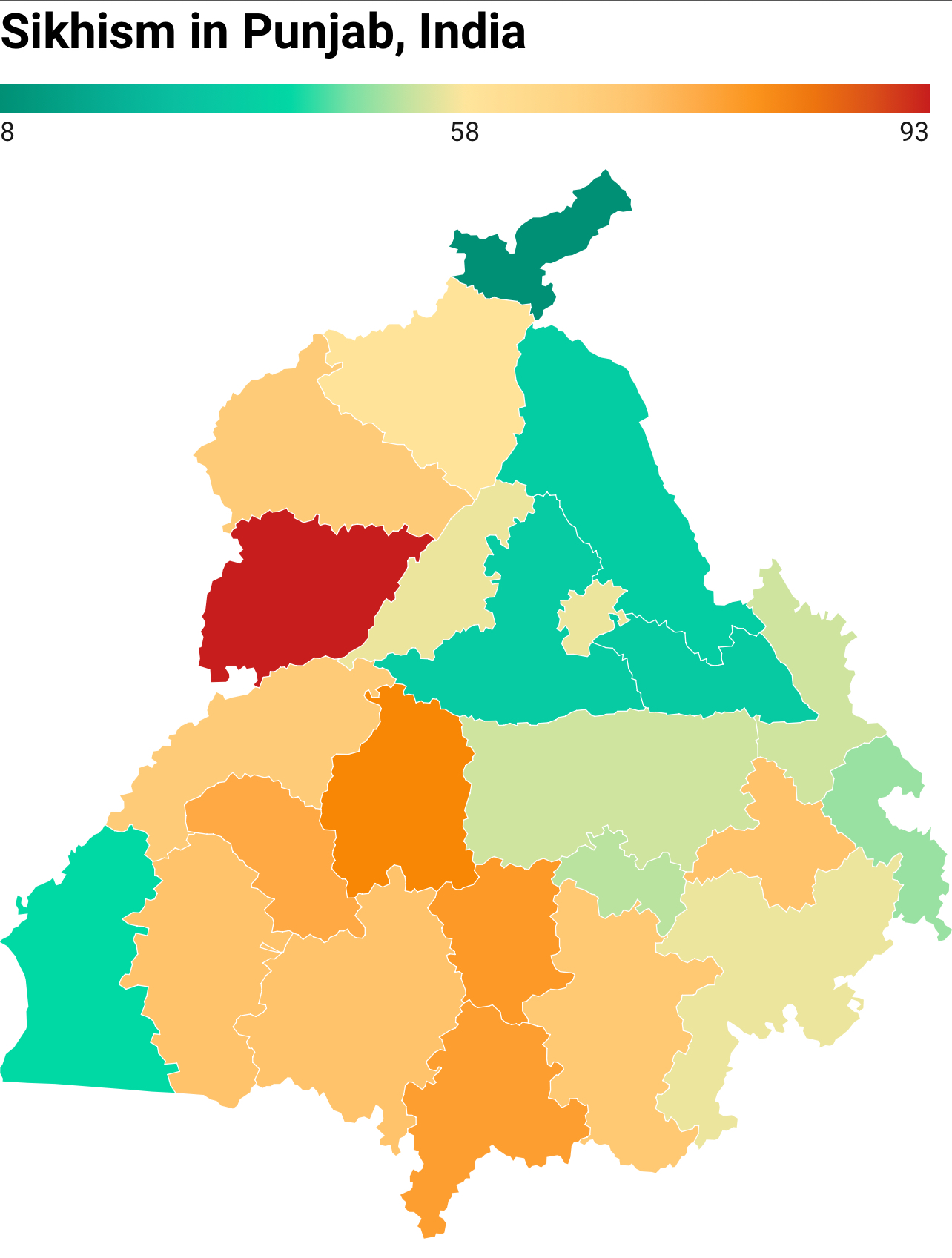
Sikhism percent in Punjab, India by district (2011 census)

Sikhism was born in the Punjab area of South Asia, which now falls into the present day states of India and Pakistan. The main religions of the area at the time were Hinduism and Islam.The Sikh faith began around 1500 CE, when Guru Nanak began teaching a faith that was quite distinct from Hinduism and Islam. Nine Gurus followed Nanak and developed the Sikh faith and community over the next centuries.

After the 1947 Partition of Punjab, Sikhs became the majority religious group in Indian Punjab mainly due to the immigration of 2 million Sikhs from Pakistan into Indian Punjab, which have ultimately resulted in an increase in Sikh percentage from 33.70% in 1941 to 60.62% in 1951. While population that adheres to Sikh faith has increased, the percentage of Sikhs has declined from 60.62% in 1951 to 57.69% (a decline of 2.93% in last 60 years).

The Sikh population in India's Punjab have grown from 5.53 million in 1951 to 16 million in 2011 census (an increase of 10.47 million in last 60 years). Sikhs in Punjab have the lowest fertility rate of 1.6 children per women as per census 2011.

Whilst Punjab, India has had a majority Sikh population for decades, recent statistics point toward a demographic decline of Sikhs in the state. School data from the Civil Registration System (CRS) shows that Sikh children are now a plurality (49%) at the foundational-level (pre-primary to Class II in the age group of 3–8-years-old). The causes for the demographic decline of Sikhs in Indian Punjab has been attributed to low fertility-rates, outbound migration of Sikhs abroad, and internal migration within India of persons from other states, oftentimes Uttar Pradesh or Bihar, settling in Indian Punjab.

Decadal percentage of Sikhs in the contemporary Punjab State, India region
Year	Percent	Increase	Source(s)
1901	19.26%*	—N/a	
1911	27.58%*	+8.32%	
1921	28.14%*	+0.56%	
1931	32.14%*	+4.00%	
1941	33.63%*	+1.49%	
1951	55.65%*	+22.02%	
1961	52.76%*	-2.89%	
1971	60.22%	+7.46%	
1981	60.75%	+0.53%	
1991	62.95%	+2.2%	
2001	59.91%	-3.04%	
2011	57.69%	-2.22%	
* - Note: 1901 to 1941 census statistics include certain regions that would ultimately be bifurcated from contemporary Punjab state (Una, Kandaghat, Mahendragarh, and Narwana tehsils), while certain regions that would form part of contemporary Punjab state (Kharar and Rupar tehsils, alongside a portion of Kasur Tehsil including Patti, Khemkaran, and 186 surrounding villages) are excluded. Likewise, 1951 & 1961 census statistics include certain regions that would ultimately be bifurcated from contemporary Punjab state (Una, Jind, and Narwana tehsils), while certain regions that would form part of contemporary Punjab state (Kharar and Rupar tehsils) are excluded. The demarcation and reorganization of boundaries in contemporary Punjab state occurred in 1966, officially termed Punjab Reorganisation Act, 1966.

== Hinduism in Punjab ==
Decadal Hindu Population in Punjab, India
Year	Pop.	±% p.a.
1901	3,278,620	—
1911	2,383,954	−3.14%
1921	2,462,215	+0.32%
1931	2,351,417	−0.46%
1941	2,597,038	+1.00%
1951	3,449,844	+2.88%
1961	4,256,936	+2.12%
1971	5,087,067	+1.80%
1981	6,200,146	+2.00%
1991	6,989,166	+1.21%
2001	8,998,214	+2.56%
2011	10,678,410	+1.73%
Source: census of India

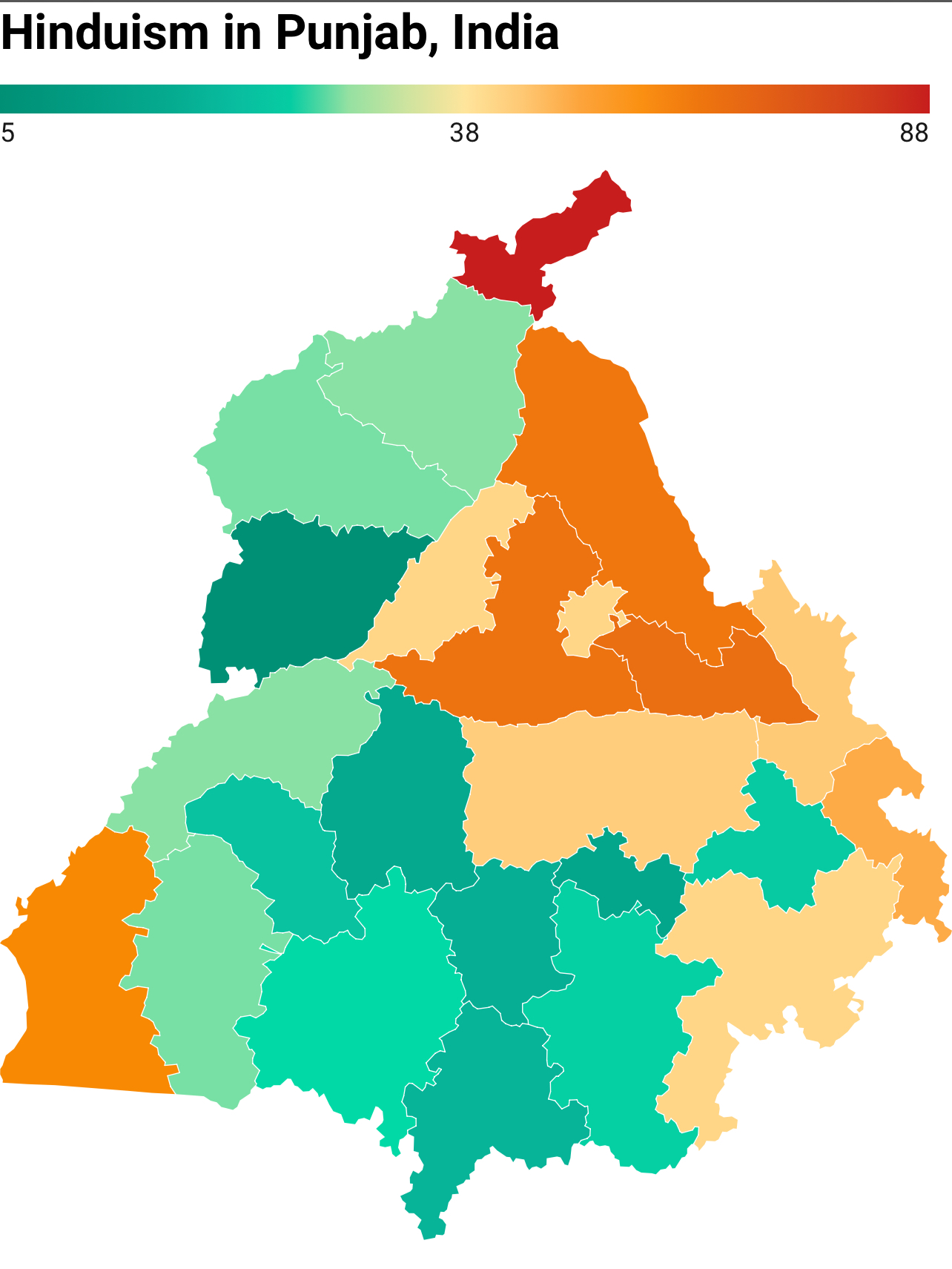
Hinduism percent in Punjab, India by district (2011 census

Hinduism is the second largest and fastest growing religion in the Indian state of Punjab with around 38.5% followers as of 2011 census. Hinduism is the 2nd largest religion of Punjabi peoples. It was the largest religion in Punjab before the advent of Islam from the West and birth of Sikhism in Punjab region from the east. The Hindu population has increased drastically in the Indian Punjab from 1941 to 1951 mainly due to the immigration of 1 million Punjabi Hindu refugees from Pakistan's Punjab.

The Hindu percentage remained stable for decades. The Hindu percentage have increased from 37.66% in 1951 to 38.49% in 2011.

The Hindu population have increased from 3.44 million in 1951 to 10.67 million in 2011 (a growth of 7.23 million in 6 decades). Hindus in Punjab have a fertility rate of 1.9 children per women as per as census 2011.

Decadal percentage of Hindus in the contemporary Punjab State, India region
Year	Percent	Increase	Source(s)
1901	42.69%*	—N/a	
1911	34.90%*	-7.79%	
1921	33.90%*	-1.00%	
1931	28.95%*	-4.95%	
1941	26.62%*	-2.33%	
1951	42.27%*	+15.65%	
1961	44.95%*	+2.68%	
1971	37.54%	-7.41%	
1981	36.93%	-0.61%	
1991	34.46%	-2.47%	
2001	36.94%	+2.48%	
2011	38.49%	+1.55%	
* - Note: 1901 to 1941 census statistics include certain regions that would ultimately be bifurcated from contemporary Punjab state (Una, Kandaghat, Mahendragarh, and Narwana tehsils), while certain regions that would form part of contemporary Punjab state (Kharar and Rupar tehsils, alongside a portion of Kasur Tehsil including Patti, Khemkaran, and 186 surrounding villages) are excluded. Likewise, 1951 & 1961 census statistics include certain regions that would ultimately be bifurcated from contemporary Punjab state (Una, Jind, and Narwana tehsils), while certain regions that would form part of contemporary Punjab state (Kharar and Rupar tehsils) are excluded. The demarcation and reorganization of boundaries in contemporary Punjab state occurred in 1966, officially termed Punjab Reorganisation Act, 1966.

== Islam in Punjab ==
Decadal Muslim Population in Punjab, India
Year	Pop.	±% p.a.
1901	2,898,114	—
1911	2,515,774	−1.40%
1921	2,686,598	+0.66%
1931	3,072,619	+1.35%
1941	3,748,410	+2.01%
1947	90,172	−46.27%
1951	110,160	+5.13%
1961	181,234	+5.10%
1971	252,688	+3.38%
1981	321,287	+2.43%
1991	390,077	+1.96%
2001	382,045	−0.21%
2011	535,489	+3.43%
Source: Census of India

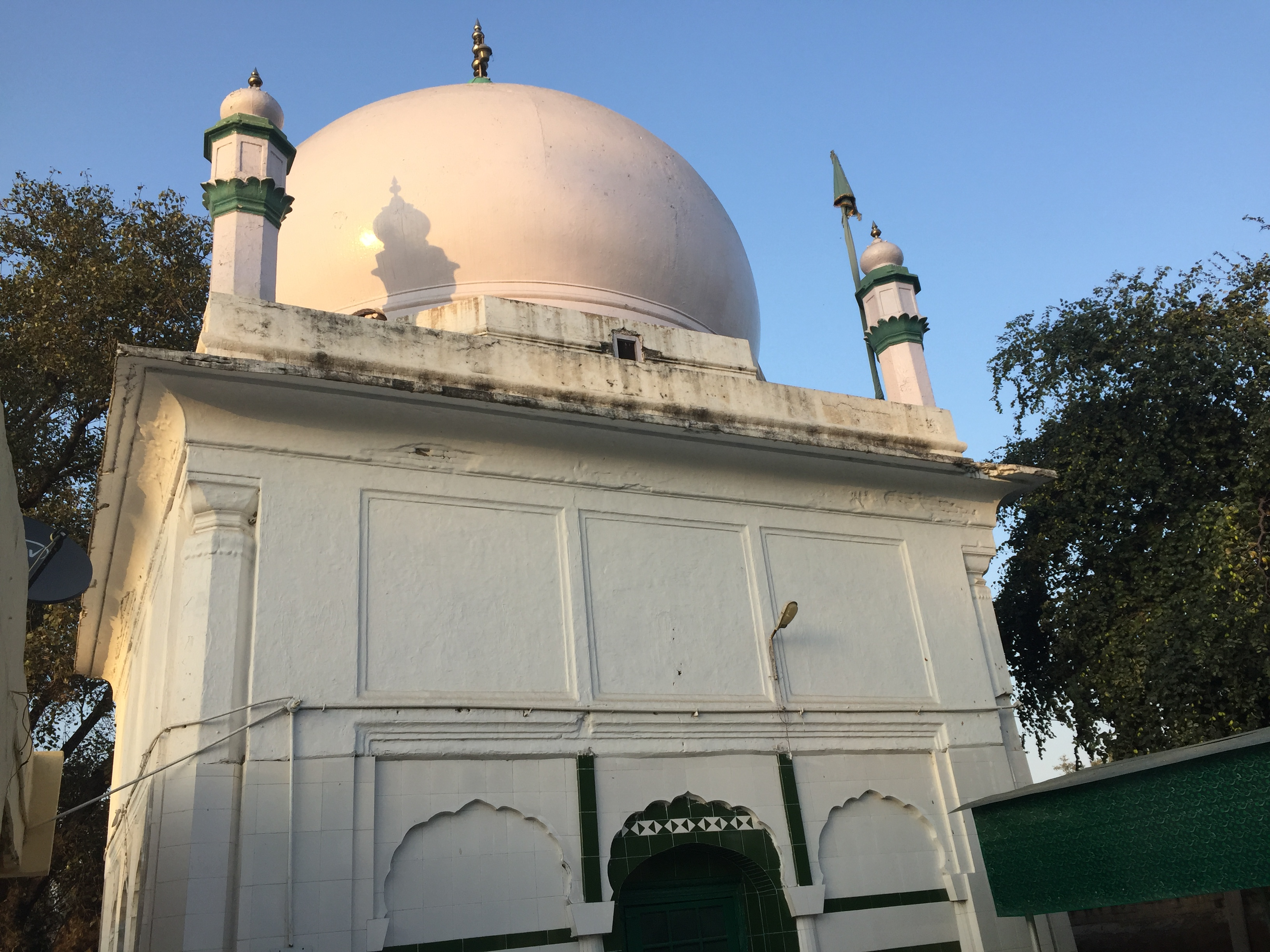
A photo of a mosque in Punjab, India

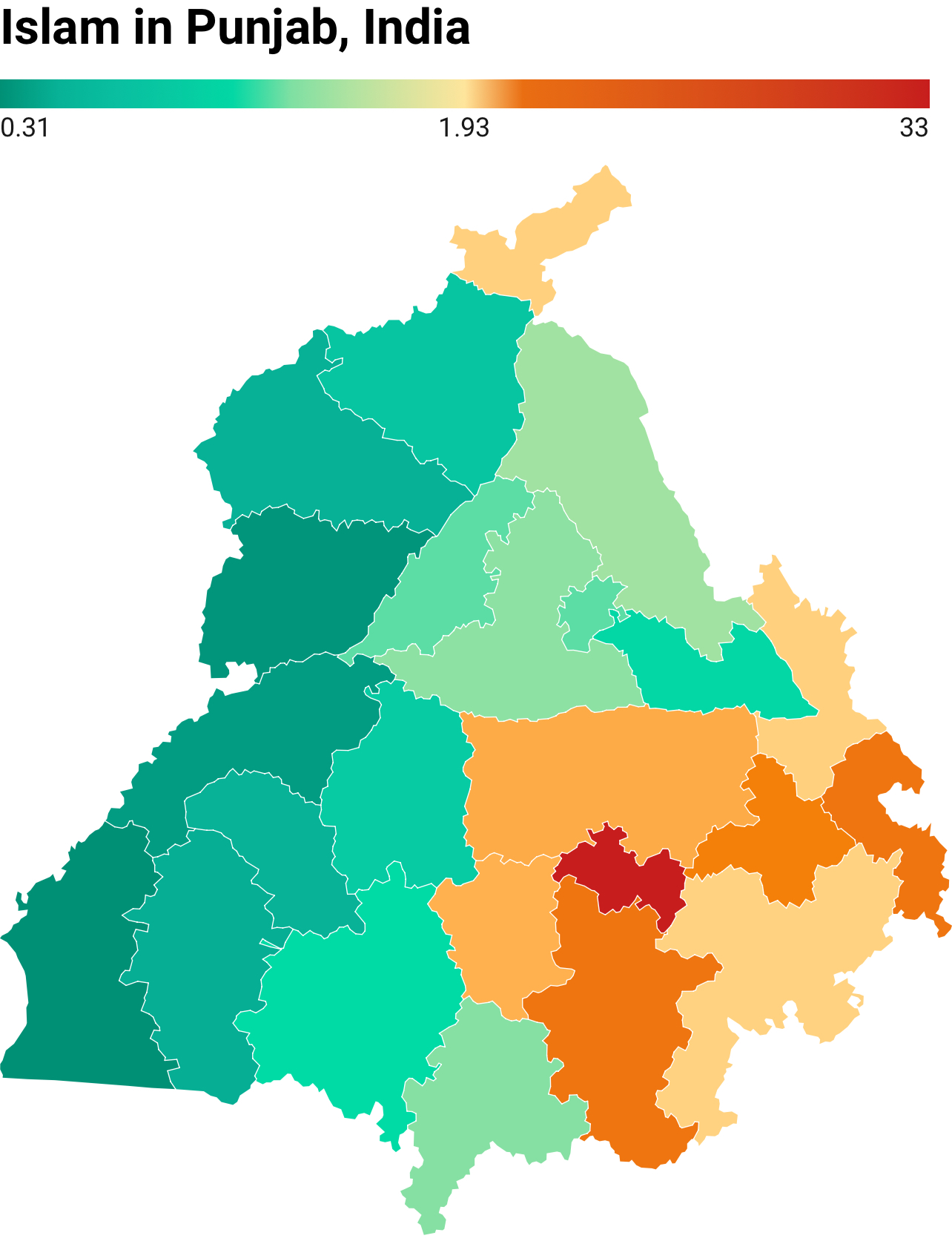
Islam percent in Punjab, India by district (2011 census)

The Muslim population in the region that comprises the contemporary state of Punjab, India reduced from approximately 38.4% according to the 1941 census to 0.5% in 1947 as a result of Partition of Punjab riots which were caused during 1947 mainly in the various parts of East Punjab.

Prior to partition, according to the 1941 census, approximately 3.75 million Muslims resided in the region that forms the contemporary state of Punjab in India. At the time, Muslims formed the largest religious community in the region, comprising a narrow plurality at approximately 38.4 percent of the total population. Following the partition of India, the vast majority departed the region en masse, migrating westward to the Punjab region that fell on the western side of the Radcliffe Line, in the contemporary state of Punjab, Pakistan.

Most native Punjabi Muslims now live in Malerkotla, and it is the only district where communal violence haven't occurred during partition because Guru Gobind Singh Ji have promised the Nawab of Malerkotla, Sher Mohammad Khan that the Muslim community in Malerkotla would never be harmed in the future times to come and as a result of Guru ji's blessing words, most of the Muslims were able to stayed back there. Apart from Malerkotla, most of the Muslims living in other parts of Punjab are non-native and have came from neighbouring states of Uttar Pradesh, Haryana, Rajasthan, Jammu & Kashmir on temporary basis as immigrants workers (small scale) and students.

Muslims in Punjab have a fertility rate of 2.4 children per women as per 2011 census. Islam is the fastest-growing religion in Punjab.

Decadal percentage of Muslims in the contemporary Punjab State, India region
Year	Percent	Increase	Source(s)
1901	37.74%*	—N/a	
1911	36.83%*	-0.91%	
1921	36.99%*	+0.16%	
1931	37.83%*	+0.84%	
1941	38.42%*	+0.59%	
1947	0.5%*	-37.92%	
1951	0.85%*	+0.35%	
1961	0.85%*	+0.00%	
1971	0.84%	-0.01%	
1981	1%	+0.07%	
1991	1.18%	+0.18%	
2001	1.57%	+0.39%	
2011	1.93%	+0.36%	
* - Note: 1901 to 1941 census statistics include certain regions that would ultimately be bifurcated from contemporary Punjab state (Una, Kandaghat, Mahendragarh, and Narwana tehsils), while certain regions that would form part of contemporary Punjab state (Kharar and Rupar tehsils, alongside a portion of Kasur Tehsil including Patti, Khemkaran, and 186 surrounding villages) are excluded. Likewise, 1951 & 1961 census statistics include certain regions that would ultimately be bifurcated from contemporary Punjab state (Una, Jind, and Narwana tehsils), while certain regions that would form part of contemporary Punjab state (Kharar and Rupar tehsils) are excluded. The demarcation and reorganization of boundaries in contemporary Punjab state occurred in 1966, officially termed Punjab Reorganisation Act, 1966.

== Religious population by districts ==
Religious population by district (2011)
#	District	Sikh	Hindu	Muslim	Christian	Jain	Buddhist	Other religions	Religion not stated
1	Amritsar	1,716,935	690,939	12,502	54,344	3,152	876	5,488	10,864
2	Barnala	467,751	112,859	13,100	622	246	108	481	360
3	Bathinda	984,286	380,569	16,299	2,474	1,266	246	559	2,826
4	Faridkot	469,789	141,363	3,125	1,227	1,109	155	103	637
5	Fatehgarh Sahib	427,521	152,851	16,808	1,698	178	48	251	808
6	Firozpur	1,090,815	906,408	6,844	19,358	1,143	454	278	3,774
7	Gurdaspur	1,002,874	1,074,332	27,667	176,587	580	405	812	15,066
8	Hoshiarpur	538,208	1,000,743	23,089	14,968	2034	3,476	531	3,576
9	Jalandhar	718,363	1,394,329	30,233	26,016	4,011	11,385	805	8,448
10	Kapurthala	453,692	336,124	10,190	5,445	553	6,662	334	2,168
11	Ludhiana	1,863,408	1,502,403	77,713	16,517	19,620	2,007	1,254	15,817
12	Mansa	598,443	156,539	10,656	917	1,577	123	493	1,284
13	Moga	818,921	158,414	9,388	3,277	436	178	365	4,767
14	Muktsar	638,625	254,920	4,333	1,681	744	240	433	920
15	Patiala	1,059,944	783,306	40,043	5,683	1,914	245	1,410	3,141
16	Rupnagar	361,045	304,481	14,492	2,094	653	118	143	1,601
17	Mohali	478,908	476,276	29,488	5,342	1,257	257	239	2,861
18	Sangrur	1,077,438	389,410	179,116	2,406	3,222	268	1,038	2,271
19	Nawanshehar	192,885	401,368	6,829	1,479	695	5,885	266	2,903
20	Tarn Taran	1,044,903	60,504	3,855	6,095	650	101	47	3,472
Punjab (Total)		16,004,754	10,678,138	535,489	348,230	45,040	33,237	10,886	87,564

Religious population proportion by district (2011)
#	District	Sikh	Hindu	Muslim	Christian	Jain	Buddhist	Other religions	Religion not stated
1	Amritsar	68.94%	27.74%	0.50%	2.18%	0.13%	0.04%	0.04%	0.44%
2	Barnala	78.54%	18.95%	2.20%	0.10%	0.04%	0.02%	0.08%	0.06%
3	Bathinda	70.89%	27.41%	1.17%	0.18%	0.09%	0.02%	0.04%	0.20%
4	Faridkot	76.08%	22.89%	0.51%	0.20%	0.18%	0.03%	0.02%	0.10%
5	Fatehgarh Sahib	71.23%	25.47%	2.80%	0.28%	0.03%	0.01%	0.04%	0.13%
6	Firozpur	53.76%	44.67%	0.34%	0.95%	0.06%	0.02%	0.01%	0.19%
7	Gurdaspur	43.64%	46.74%	1.20%	7.68%	0.03%	0.02%	0.04%	0.66%
8	Hoshiarpur	33.92%	63.07%	1.46%	0.94%	0.13%	0.22%	0.03%	0.23%
9	Jalandhar	32.75%	63.56%	1.38%	1.19%	0.18%	0.52%	0.04%	0.39%
10	Kapurthala	55.66%	41.23%	1.25%	0.67%	0.07%	0.82%	0.04%	0.27%
11	Ludhiana	53.26%	42.94%	2.22%	0.47%	0.56%	0.06%	0.04%	0.45%
12	Mansa	77.75%	20.34%	1.35%	0.12%	0.20%	0.02%	0.06%	0.17%
13	Moga	82.24%	15.91%	0.94%	0.33%	0.04%	0.02%	0.04%	0.48%
14	Muktsar	70.81%	28.26%	0.48%	0.19%	0.08%	0.03%	0.05%	0.10%
15	Patiala	55.91%	41.32%	2.11%	0.30%	0.10%	0.01%	0.07%	0.17%
16	Rupnagar	52.74%	44.47%	2.12%	0.31%	0.10%	0.02%	0.02%	0.23%
17	Mohali	48.15%	47.88%	2.96%	0.54%	0.13%	0.03%	0.02%	0.29%
18	Sangrur	65.10%	23.53%	10.82%	0.15%	0.19%	0.02%	0.06%	0.14%
19	Nawanshehar	31.50%	65.55%	1.12%	0.24%	0.11%	0.96%	0.04%	0.47%
20	Tarn Taran	93.33%	5.40%	0.34%	0.54%	0.06%	0.01%	0.00%	0.31%
Punjab (Total)		57.69%	38.49%	1.93%	1.26%	0.16%	0.12%	0.04%	0.32%

== See also ==
- Punjabis
- Sikhs
- Punjabi Hindus
- Punjabi Muslims
- Health in Punjab, India
- Women in Punjab, India
