= Narwana =

- Town
- Narwana
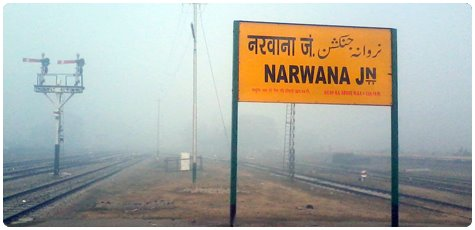
- A view of Narwana railway station (Jind district, Haryana)

- Location in Haryana, India Narwana (India)
- Coordinates: 29.616667°N 76.1116667°E
- Country: India
- State: Haryana
- District: Jind
- Elevation: 225.16 m (738.7 ft)

Population (2011)
  - Total: 62,090

Languages
  - Spoken: Haryanvi and Hindi
- Time zone: UTC+5:30 (IST)
- PIN: 126116
- Telephone code: 01684
- Vehicle registration: HR-32

Narwana is a town and a municipal council, just 36 km from Jind city in Jind district in the Indian state of Haryana.

== History and etymology ==
According to historical references and the ancestors, there are several myths related to the existence of the city's name. One of them is that it was named after a lake, Nirwana, near Baba Gaibi Sahib Temple. And another one is that people with the Jat surname Mor lived in Narwana with a large number of the population before and it was called Morwana before and later was changed to Narwana. Before the partition in 1947, 25% of Narwana's population were Muslims, mainly Arains, Lohars, Rajputs and Julahas, who all migrated to Pakistan and settled in the environs of Bahawalnagar and Minchinabad.

== Geography ==
Narwana is located at 29.616667°N 76.116667°E. It has an average elevation of 213 metres (702 feet).

=== Climate ===
Narwana features a typical version of the humid subtropical climate. Summers are long and extremely hot, from early April to mid-October, with the monsoon season in between. The months of March to May see a time of hot prickling heat. Monsoon arrives at the end of June, bringing some respite from the heat, but increasing humidity at the same time. The brief, mild winter starts in late November and peaks in January and is notorious for its heavy fog. Extreme temperatures range from −0.6 °C (30.9 °F) to 46.7 °C (116.1 °F).

=== Religions and Communities ===
Hindus constitute the bulk of the population mainly of Jats(Mors, Nains).

== Education ==
There are number of schools in the city affiliated either to State board or Central board. Also there are many schools affiliated to CBSE.

== Demographics ==
As of 2011 India census, Narwana had a population of 62090. Males constitute 38,073 of the population and females 34,017. Narwana has an average literacy rate of 77.22%, higher than the national average of 74.04%.

=== Road connectivity ===
Narwana is at a crossroads and is well connected. Major roads leads to Delhi, Patiala, Hisar and Chandigarh. Travellers may find easy transport from here to many cities like Jind, Rohtak, Bahadurgarh, Delhi, Gurugram, Tohana, Jakhal, Bathinda, Patiala, Ludhiana, Kaithal, Pundri, Ambala, Kurukshetra, Chandigarh, Safidon, Panipat, Karnal, and so on. It is connected to NH-52, NH-152 and NH-352. Haryana Roadways and PRTC buses ply frequently to these destinations. Buses are more frequent in daytime. Private bus and Taxi is available at ease from local stands.

=== Railway connectivity ===
Narwana is short coded as NRW in Indian Railways It is on the main BG line that connects the national capital to Bhatinda (Punjab). It is also a junction station with branch line to Kurukshetra.

=== Airport links ===
Nearest Airports to Narwana are- Hisar domestic, Chandigarh and Delhi international airport. Ambala is likely to be the next in the list of domestic airports. A few private companies also provide charted flights from Sirsa, which is 2 hours distance by road.
