= Kamlah Fort =

Fort in Himachal Pradesh, India

Coordinates: 31.8081°N 76.6737°E

Kamlah Fort (also: Kamlahgarh or Kamlah Garh, from Hindi गढ़ (Garh): "fort") is a 17th-century fort located near Kamlah village in the province of Himachal Pradesh, India west of Mandi. It was probably constructed in 1625 by Raja Suraj Sen of Mandi.

The Mandi kingdom depended on its forts for its security, and Kamlah Fort had the reputation of being the most secure repository of the reputed 360 forts of the Mandi state from the rule of Suraj Sen to that of Ishvari Sen (1788–1826). Maharaja Ranjit Singh attacked the fort in 1830. It was destroyed in 1840 and then retaken a few years later and reconstructed by Mandi Kings.

== History ==
Kamlah Fort (or Kamlahgarh), strategically placed near Kamlah village in Mandi district, Himachal Pradesh. It was originally erected around 1625 by Raja Suraj Sen to serve as the principal stronghold of the Mandi kingdom’s. This fortress became the secure repository for Mandi’s treasury and armaments, earning a reputation for impregnability through the reigns of successive rulers up to Ishwari Singh (1788–1826).

In 1830, Maharaja Ranjit Singh of the Sikh Empire laid an unsuccessful siege to Kamlah, only for a combined Sikh-British force to breach its defenses a decade later in 1840. It resulted in partial destruction of its walls. After the Treaty of Amritsar (October 1846) restored the fort to the Mandi rulers, extensive reconstruction works were undertaken to rebuild its ramparts and internal chambers, ensuring the fort resumed its defensive and administrative roles into the late 19th century.

== Architecture ==
The Kamlah fort was located at an elevation of 4,772 ft on the rugged Sikandar Dhar ridge. Kamlah Fort comprises six contiguous defensive enclosures Kamlah, Chauki, Chabara, Padampur, Shamsherpur, and Narsingpur. It is linked by naturally steep cliffs on three sides and accessible only via a fortified eastern gateway reached by a 40‑step stone staircase carved into the hillside. The fort’s outer walls, constructed of locally quarried grey sandstone and bonded with lime mortar, a design choice that both sheds rainfall during the monsoon season. Internally, chambers carved directly into the cliff face served as granaries and armories, while monsoon runoff was collected in rock‑cut cisterns, ensuring water and provisions for a garrison during prolonged sieges. The combination of narrow entrances, commanding bastions, and integrated natural defenses typifies the Western Himalayan hill‑fort tradition, blending geology and masonry into a near‑impregnable network.

== See also ==
- Forts in India
- Suket State
- Raja
