= Kamaksha Temple =

Kamaksha temple
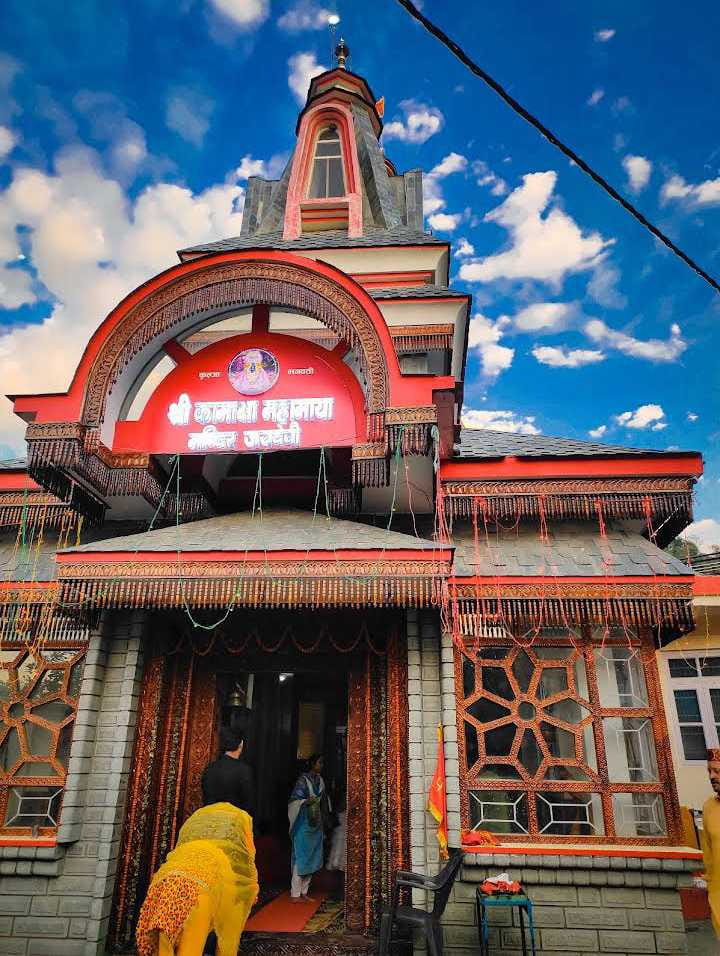
- Kamaksha temple

- Location In Jaidevi

Religion
- Affiliation: Hinduism
- District: Mandi
- Deity: Kamaksha, kamakhya
- Festivals: Suket Fair, Navratri, Durga Pooja

Location
- Location: Jaidevi
- State: Himachal Pradesh
- Country: India
- Interactive map of Kamaksha temple
- Coordinates: 31.50061°N 76.95657°E

Architecture
- Completed: 12th-21st century
- Monument: 4

Website
- https://www.jaidevi.in/

Shri Kamaksha Temple Jaidevi, also known as the Kul Devi (family deity) of the Suket royal family and the Raj-Rajeshwari and Adhisthatri Devi of the Suket principality, is a historic Hindu temple surrounded by mountains in a natural setting.

Kamaksha means "the goddess who fulfills all desires." This place is famous in the region and is known as Jaidevi. The deities celebrated at this place are Shri Mahunag Ji Jaidevi and Shri Bala Tika Ji Kafla Ji, and the origin of the place is attributed to the Goddess Kamaksha.

== Kamakhya Shakta pitha ==
The original temple of the goddess Kamakhya Shakta pitha is in Assam. In different parts of India, she is known as Kamakhya in the east, Kamaksha in the north, and Kamakshi in the south.

As the Kul Devi of the Suket royal family, Maa Kamaksha is given the foremost position in the Suket fair and the Jatar (religious procession). It is said that the Suket fair is associated with Dev Kamrunag, Mool Mahunag, and the name of Maa Kamaksha.

== Kamaksha ==
According to the history of Maa Kamaksha, when the ancient king Shri Shyam Sen of Suket was shifting the capital of his old principality from Pangana to the new capital of Karatarpur, Lohara, and Baned, it was decided to bring the goddess Kamaksha from the old palace to the new palace.

It was during this time that the temple of Maa Kamaksha was built at this place (Jaidevi) and the idol was consecrated. From that moment, the entire earth resounded with the chants of Jaidevi-Jaidevi, and the place came to be known as Jaidevi.

== History ==
If we talk about the history before this, it is said that the original place of the Suket rulers was Bengal. When the kings ventured towards the northern direction in ancient times to establish their capital and rule, they brought the magnificent idol of Goddess Kamaksha from Assam (Bengal/Kolkata/Guwahati) to this place.

In this temple, both the forms of the goddess, Devi Kula and Kali, reside. The construction of Bhagwati Kamaksha Jaidevi Temple was done by the king of Suket, and it has been restored several times by the temple committee and the local people.

== Suket Fair ==
It has always been a tradition of the Suket royal family that before undertaking any auspicious task, the king would seek the blessings of his Kul Devi. For this purpose, the king would invite his Kul Devi to his palace. In the local language, this invitation is called "Jatra". In ancient times, the king and some officials would personally bring Maa Kamaksha to the fair.

After that, the king would bring the Kul Devi with great pomp and show to his palace and she would reside there along with the priests for a few days. During this time, the fair of the goddess would be organized in the palace. Initially, the fair of the goddess was held in Lohara, then in Karatarpur, and finally in Baned.

After 1900, Devi was brought to the Suket fair by the last king of Suket, Lakshman Sen, along with Raja Mahunag Ji. After 1921, Devi was brought to the fair with Mahamaya (the famous deity of Panga, the first capital of Suket, and the Adhisthatri Devi of the Suket royal family). And even today, Devi.

== Gallery ==
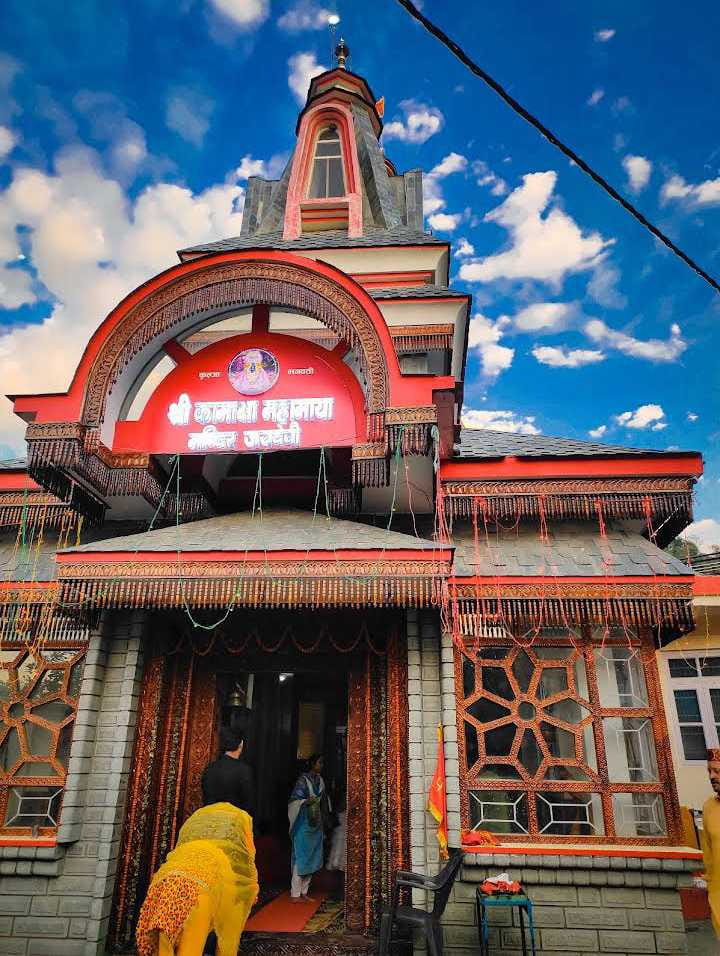
Kamaksha mata Temple Jaidevi

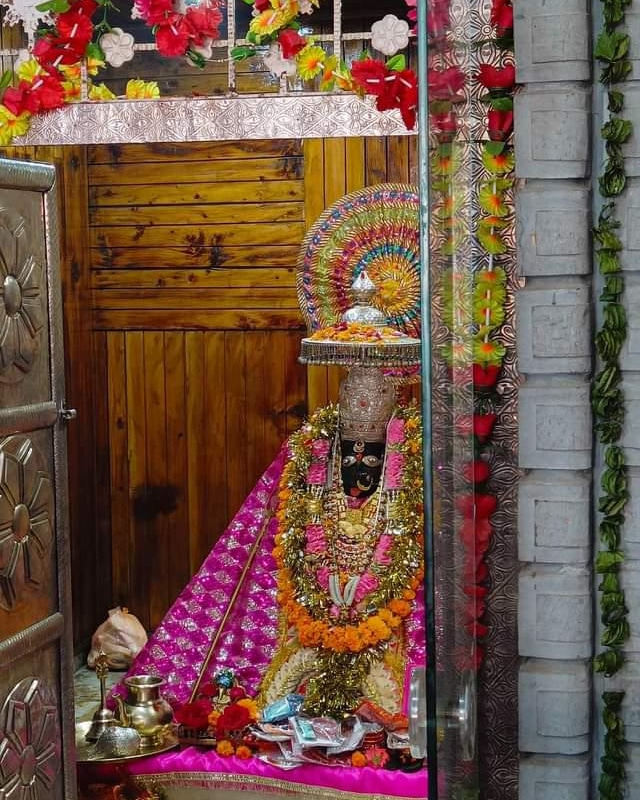
Kamakshi mata temple Jaidevi

== See also ==
- kamaksha
- Jaidevi
