= Hari Sen =

Indian historian (1955–2024)

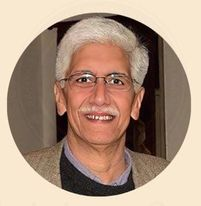
- Born: 15 August 1955; Sundar Nagar, Himachal Pradesh, India
- Died: 30 March 2024 (aged 68); New Delhi, India
- Citizenship: Indian
- Education: St. Columba's School, Delhi; St. Stephen's College, Delhi; Delhi University
- Employer(s): Ramjas College, Delhi University
- Known for: Teaching history at Delhi University
- Spouse: Prof. Radhika Chopra
- Relatives: Lalit Sen (father); Laxman Singh (maternal grandfather); Pran Chopra (father-in-law)
- Family: The royal family of Suket State

Hari Sen (15 August 1955 – 30 March 2024) was an Indian academic historian from Himachal Pradesh. He taught history at Delhi University and conducted research on the Bhils of colonial Rajasthan. He was also the titular Raja of the erstwhile princely state of Suket.

== Personal life ==
Hari Sen was born in 1955 in the royal family of Suket, an erstwhile 11-gun salute princely state whose capital used to be the present-day town of Sundar Nagar in Himachal Pradesh. Sen's father was Lalit Sen (1932–1985) – a two-time member of parliament from the Mandi constituency – and his paternal grandfather was Raja Lakshman Sen Bahadur (1895–1970), the last ruling king of Suket. Sen's mother was Krishna Kumari, daughter of Maharawal Sir Lakshman Singh (the last ruling king of Dungarpur) from his second wife. Sen nominally succeeded to the 'gaddi' (throne) of Suket on 18 October 1985, as the 52nd 'Raja Saheb' of Suket. His nominal title was His Highness Raja Hari Sen Bahadur of Suket. Sen was married to Dr. Radhika Chopra, a renowned Indian sociologist and the daughter of the journalist Pran Chopra.

Sen was the trustee and president of the Maharaja Lakshman Sen Memorial College in Sundar Nagar.

Sen, who was a friend of the writer Amitav Ghosh, features prominently in Ghosh's often-reprinted essay about the 1984 anti-Sikh riots in Delhi, 'The Ghosts of Mrs Gandhi'.

Sen died in New Delhi on 30 March 2024, at the age of 68.

== Academic career ==
=== Education ===
Sen did his schooling from St. Columba's School, Delhi, his MA in history from St. Stephen's College, Delhi University, and PhD from the Department of History, Delhi University. His PhD dissertation was titled Popular Protest in Mewar in the Late-Nineteenth and Early-Twentieth Centuries (unpublished, 1996).

=== Teaching ===
Sen taught history at Ramjas College, Delhi University, from October 1991 till his retirement in August 2020. He was widely known as a teacher of history at Delhi University. He has been mentioned as an influence in the works of several historians and other scholars of South Asia, including Ramchandra Guha (2000), Prakash Kumar (2012), Monika Saxena (2018), Pankaj Jha (2018), Radhika Chopra (2018), and Nikhil Menon (2022).

== Bibliography ==
=== Book chapters ===
- Sen, Hari. "The Bhil rebellion of 1881". In Issues in Modern Indian History: for Sumit Sarkar. Popular Prakashan, 2000.
- Sen, Hari. "The Bhils in Colonial Mewar." In Negotiating India’s Past: Essays in Memory of Partha Sarathi Gupta. Tulika Books, 2003.
- Sen, Hari. "The Maharana and the Bhils: The ‘Eki’ movement in Mewar, 1921–22." In India's Princely States, pp. 157–172. Routledge, 2007.
