= Amrit Kaur of Mandi =

Indian princess

Queen Amrit Kaur
- Queen Consort of Mandi; Princess of Kapurthala
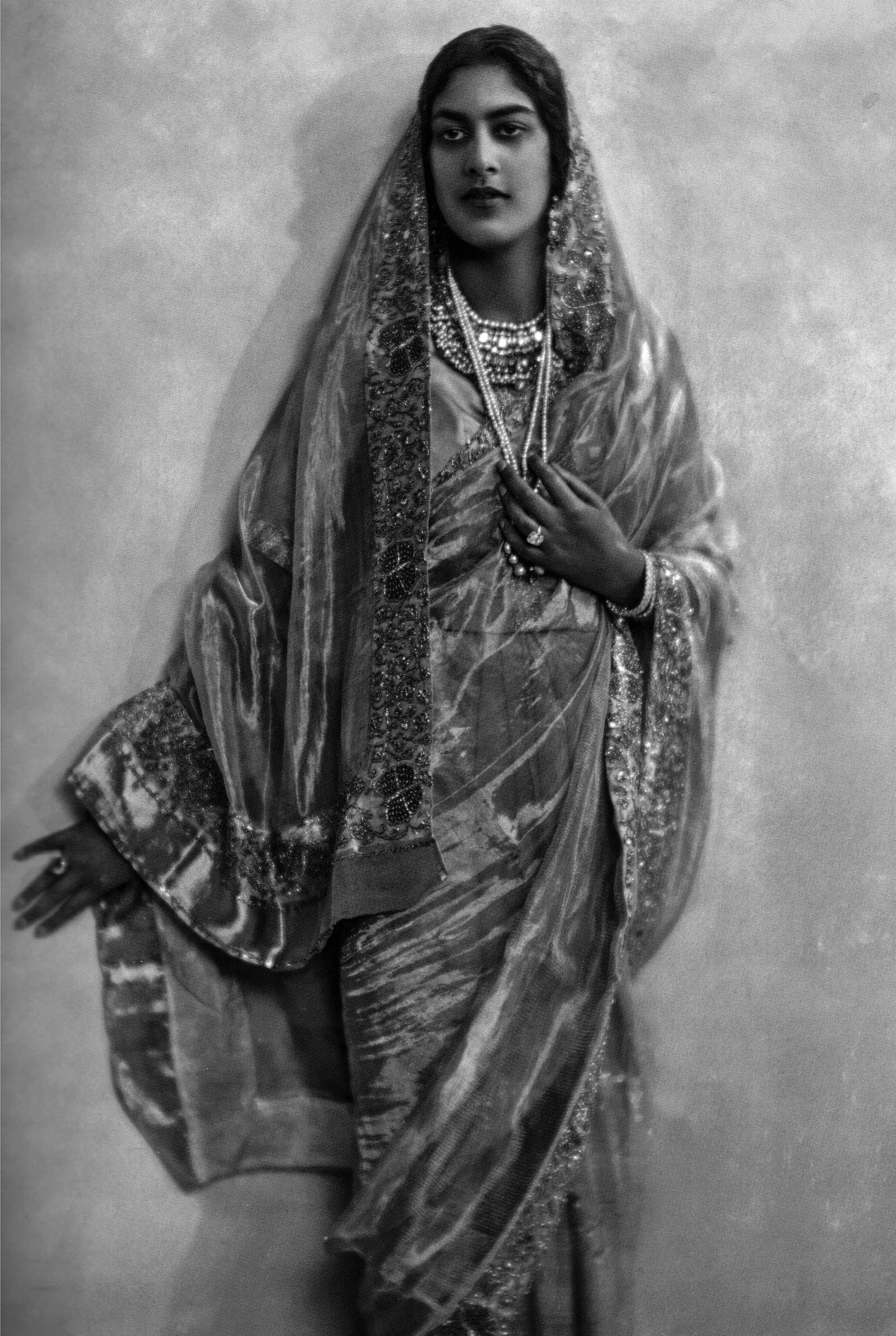
- Queen Amrit Kaur in 1924

Queen Consort of Mandi
- Tenure: 8 February 1923 – 15 April 1948
- Born: 1904
- Died: 19 November 1948 (aged 43–44); No. 42 Kensington Palace Gardens, Kensington, London
- Spouse: Joginder Sen I of Mandi (m. 1923, sep. 1933 – 1948; her death)
- Issue: Yashodan Singh, Crown Prince of Mandi; Princess Nirvana Devi, Princess of Bilkha
- Dynasty: Mandi
- Father: Jagatjit Singh I of Kapurthala
- Mother: Kanari Kaur

Rani Shri Amrit Kaur Sahiba of Mandi (1904–1948) was the only daughter of Jagatjit Singh Sahib Bahadur and his fourth wife, Rani Kanari Sahiba. Jagatjit reigned as maharaja between 1890 and 1947 in Kapurthala, northern Punjab. She is most known for selling her jewels to save Jews during World War II.

== Biography ==
Maharaja Jagatjit Singh of Kapurthala State with his four sons and daughter, Amrit Kaur (center) in Paris, 1905.

Amrit Kaur was born in 1904 in the princely state of Kapurthala, the only daughter of Maharaja Jagatjit Singh and his fourth wife, Rani Kanari. She had five brothers, including Karamjit Singh, who shared the same mother.

She was educated at Clovelly-Kepplestone, a progessive girls' boarding school in Eastbourne, Sussex, England, where she played tennis, led a five-piece jazz band and acted in plays. She was then sent to Paris. Amrit was given away in marriage in 1923 to the Raja of Mandi Joginder Sen Bahadur. The couple toured Europe soon after their wedding, and were received in London by King George V and Queen Mary. After five months, they returned to Mandi, India, and the couple had a son and a daughter, Tikka Yashodan Singh (born 1923) and Princess Nirvana Devi (born 1929).

Subsequently, she was involved in the women's rights movement, advocated women's education and opposed child marriage and polygamy. In an interview by the New York Herald Tribune in 1927, Amrit expressed determination to fight for the poorest and most marginalised women. In January 1931, Kaur delivered the welcome address at the first All-Asian Women's Conference, held in Lahore. When her husband took a second wife, Amrit left India and her children for Paris in 1933 and never returned.

Kaur spent some time in the United States before returning to Paris just as World War II broke out. She was arrested on 8 December 1940 by the Gestapo in occupied Paris "on the accusation of having sold her jewelry to help Jews leave" France and imprisoned in the internment camp Besançon. Amrit's father wrote to the British Foreign Office and to Marshal Pétain, asking for help in obtaining her release. The Germans offered to exchange Amrit for one of their spies imprisoned in India, but a British official decided that her repatriation was "not of sufficient political importance" to justify such a deal.

Following her release from wartime internment in France, Kaur spent her final years in England, where she experienced financial and health difficulties. She died of cancer in London in 1948. The first female Indian cabinet minister, Amrit Kaur, was her father's cousin.

== Legacy ==
In 2022, an Italian journalist for the Corriere della Sera, Livia Manera Sambuy, wrote a biography, Il segreto di Amrit Kaur, that was published in English as In Search of Amrit Kaur in 2023.

== Bibliography ==
- Manera Sambuy, Livia (2023). In Search of Amrit Kaur: A Lost Princess and Her Vanished World. Translated by Todd Portnowitz. Farrar, Straus and Giroux. ISBN 9780374715724. Originally Il segreto di Amrit Kaur (in Italian). Feltrinelli. 2022. ISBN 9788807035128.
