= Suket Fair =

Suket Devta Fair in Sunder Nagar

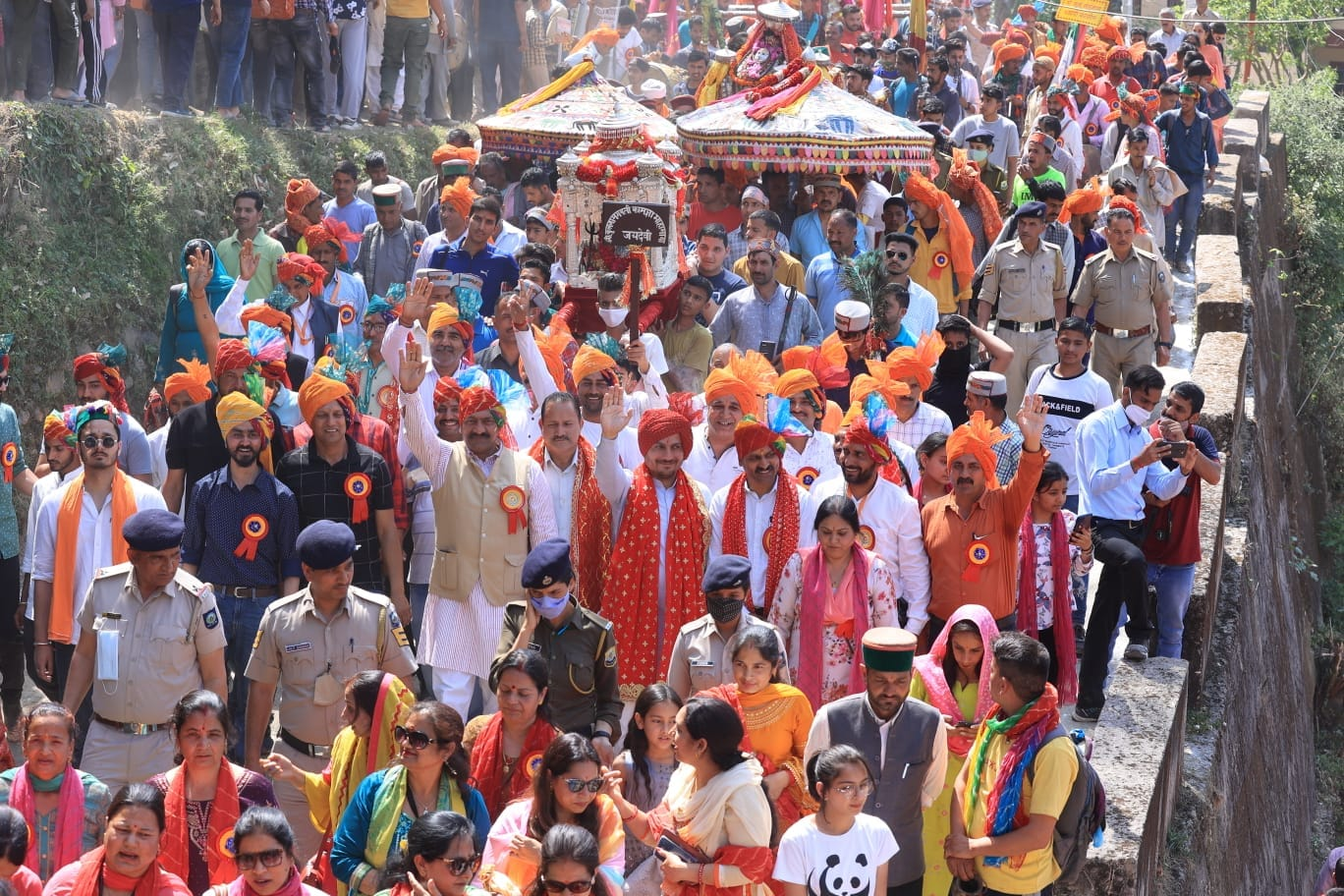
- Suket devta mela Jaleb with 150 devi devta
- Nickname: Suket devta mela
- Status: active
- Genre: Fairs and festivals
- Begins: 5th day of Chaitra Navratri
- Ends: 9th day of Chaitra Navratri
- Frequency: Annually, 5th day of Hindu New Year
- Venue: Suket Mela Ground
- Locations: Sundar Nagar, India
- Coordinates: 31.52682266907815°N 76.8871887551437°E
- Years active: From 13th Century
- Previous event: 26 March 2023
- Next event: 13 April 2024
- Organiser: Suket devta mela Community
- Member: Chairperson-; DC, Mandi: Vice-Chairperson-SDM, Sundar Nagar
- Sponsor: Government of Himachal Pradesh
- Website: https://www.sundernagarnalwar.com

Suket Fair is an annual Indian state-level fair held in Sundar Nagar, Himachal Pradesh during the Hindu festival Chaitra Navratri. According to the local people, it is also known by the names Suket Devta Mela and Sundernagar Mela, among others.

According to the Hindu calendar, the Suket Fair is organized every year for 5 days. It starts on the fifth day of the Shukla Paksha of the Chaitra month (Panchami Navratri) and continues until the ninth day (Final Navratri ), which corresponds to March/April according to the Westerners calendar. Due to the immense popularity of this festival, it has been accorded the status of a state-level festival, where people regard it as an expression of faith and devotion to the deities. Every year, more than 250 deities are invited to this fair. This makes it considered the deilargestty fair in Himachal Pradesh, with participation from over 150 deities. In 2024, this festival will be celebrated from April 13 to April 18.

The fair is particularly famous because it transforms Sundar Nagar into a festival ground where all the deities, said to be more than 150 from the Suket princely state, participate in this celebration.

== History ==
The history of the Suket Fair is nearly 700 years old. Its foundation was laid in the 13th century by King Narendra Singh of the Suket princely state. At that time, this fair used to be held with great pomp and show in the capital of the Suket State, Lohara. It is said that the Suket king organized this fair for his family deity, Kamaksha. Its inception began when the king invited his family deity to his palace. This fair gradually became the center of faith throughout the region, though this tradition faced several interruptions.

In the 17th century, King Prithvi Chand shifted the capital from Lohara to Sundar Nagar, also known as "Banead.". Since then, this fair started taking place in Ashoknagar. The Lal Pahadi of Sundar Nagar became the hub of the fair, attracting devotees. It's said that during the 17th century, the number of deities participating in the fair began to increase gradually. Historical records mention that in the 16th century, Raja Shyam Sen was freed by the Manhunag deity from Aurangzeb's captivity, and as a result, the king promised to grant half of his kingdom to the deity. Even though the deity didn't take the kingdom, thereafter, the people of Suket started recognizing the deity as their king. Following this, the Suket king hosted the Manhunag deity in his palace. According to locals and several historians, there have been intervals between this fair multiple times, causing the tradition to break and reconnect.

In the 19th century, this fair was restarted, with its foundation laid by Raja Lakshman Sen. The main deities of the fair became Shri Mool Manhunag Bkhari, Devi Kamaksha, Devi Mahamaya Pangda (and her five guardians), and Dev Kamrunag Ji. Gradually, with time, the number of deities increased. As of 2024, more than 150 deities will participate in the Suket Fair. What sets the Suket Fair apart is that deities from various parts of Mandi district come here to bless the devotees, adorning vibrant and traditional attire, creating a devotional atmosphere. Devotees visit these deities, make wishes, and seek blessings.

== Observance ==
The fair is organized on the fifth day of the New Year. As per 2024, the fair commences in Sukhdev Vatika, where various deities from the entire Suket princely state gather. The start of the procession, with the chariots of the family deity Kamaksha and Mool Manhunag Ji, marks the beginning of the Suket Fair. As per the Suket king, Kamaksha and Mahamaya hold the first position in this procession. After worshiping all the deities, the procession starts, culminating at the fairground, now known as Jawaharlal Nehru Park.

Over a five-day period, the festival attracts pilgrims from various regions. The event has contributed to Himachal Pradesh's designation as the "Land of the Gods," referencing the preservation of local religious traditions. Programmed activities include cultural contests such as the Brajantari competition, as well as theatrical and musical performances depicting the history of the revered deities.

The fair concludes with the king's procession, starting from the Mahamaya Temple in Sundar Nagar and culminating at the king's palace. In this procession, the five palanquins of Mahamaya are prepared, leading the way, accompanied by Devi Kamaksha. Lord Kamrunag also initiates the grand procession of the fair from the forefront. Along this route, the king of Suket stands with devotees at his palace to welcome the deities, performing worship rituals for all of them. In the courtyard of the palace, all the deities perform dances, and after the worship of all the deities is completed, they re-enter the Suket Fair with the five palanquins of Mahamaya.

Subsequently, the five palanquins of Mahamaya are taken on a tour throughout Sundar Nagar so that everyone can have their darshan. After nightfall, all the deities depart to their respective places.

== Visitor information ==
Sunser Nagar is accessible by road from Mandi, Shimla, Chandigarh, Pathankot and Delhi. The nearest railway stations are Joginder Nagar and Shimla by narrow-gauge train. It is connected to Chandigarh and Kalka by a broad gauge line of the Indian Railways. Kullu-Manali airport Bhuntar is the nearest airport, it is about 69 km from Mandi town.
