= Joginder Sen =

Raja (King) of Mandi
- Reign: 28 April 1913 – 15 April 1948
- Predecessor: King Bhawani Sen I
- Successor: Monarchy abolished; Kingdom transformed into the District of Mandi in the new State of PEPSU in the Republic of India
- Born: Joginder Sen; 20 August 1904; Kingdom of Mandi (now State of Himachal Pradesh), Empire of India (now Republic of India)
- Died: 16 June 1986 (aged 81); Mandi, Himachal Pradesh, India
- Spouse: Princess Amrit Kaur of Kapurthala (m. 1923, sep. 1933 – 1948; her death); Princess Kusum Kumari of Rajpipla (m. 1930 - 1986; his death)
- Issue: With Queen Amrit Kaur: Yashodan Singh, Crown Prince of Mandi; Princess Nirvana Devi, Princess of Bilkha; With Queen Kusum Kumari: Ashokpal Sen, Crown Prince of Mandi; Princess Indira Kumari
Regnal name
- Raja Shri Joginder Sen I Bahadur
- Father: Prince Kishan Singh of Mandi

Member of Lok Sabha from Mandi
- In office 1957–1962

Joginder Sen I of Mandi (20 August 1904 – 16 June 1986) was the last ruling Raja (King) of the Kingdom of Mandi, and was subsequently a diplomat and Member of Parliament.

== Life ==
Joginder Sen succeeded to the Mandi throne on 28 April 1913, aged eight. On 18 February 1925, he received an honorary commission as a lieutenant in the British Indian Army. Knighted as a Knight Commander of the Order of the Star of India (KCSI) in the 1931 New Year Honours list, he was promoted to honorary captain on 26 September 1931 and to honorary major on 24 December 1938. He received his final promotion to honorary lieutenant-colonel on 15 October 1946, and received an honorary commission in the same rank in the post-Independence Indian Army on 18 January 1951.

After serving as Ambassador to Brazil, Raja Joginder Sen represented the Mandi constituency in the Lok Sabha from 1957 to 1962.

== Marriages and issue ==
On 08 February 1923, 18-year old Joginder Sen married the 17-year old Punjabi Princess Amrit Kaur of Kapurthala, only daughter of the 6 children of Maharaja Jagatjit Singh I of Kapurthala and his fourth wife Maharani Kanari Kaur.
The royal couple toured Europe soon after their wedding and were received in London by King George V and Queen Mary. After five months of their travels, they returned to Mandi.
Joginder Sen I and Amrit Kaur had two children:

- Crown Prince Yashodan Singh (07 December 1923 – 16 May 1980) married Princess Meena Devi (daughter of Prince Dalip Singh I, Prince of the Principality of Dhami and his wife Princess Tara Devi of Tharoch); the couple divorced in 1959 with no issue and Yashodan Singh never remarried.
- Princess Nirvana Devi (12 December 1928)

on 13 May 1930, Joginder Sen remarried by taking a second wife with Gujarati Princess Kusum Kumari of Rajpipla, daughter of Prince Prithirajsinh of Rajpipla and his wife Princess Tara Kunver of Udaipur.
Joginder Sen I and Kusum Kumari had two children:

- Crown Prince Ashokpal Sen (05 August 1931 - 16 February 2021)
- Princess Indira Kumari (08 November 1938)

Raja Joginder Sen I House of Mandi Born: 20 August 1904 Died: 16 June 1986
Indian royalty
Regnal titles
Preceded by King Bhawani Sen I	Raja (King) of Mandi; 28 April 1913 – 15 April 1948	Monarchy abolished
Titles in pretence
Preceded by Himself as Monarch of the Kingdom of Mandi	— TITULAR — Raja (King) of Mandi; 15 April 1948 – 16 June 1986; Reason for succession failure: Kingdom of Mandi merged into the State of PEPSU as the District of Mandi	Succeeded by Raja Ashokpal Sen I
Diplomatic posts
Preceded by Minoo Masani	Ambassador of India to Brazil; 1952–1956	Succeeded by Lal Ram Saran Singh
Lok Sabha
Preceded by Princess Amrit Kaur Ahluwalia	Member of Parliament for Mandi; 1957–1962	Succeeded by Crown Prince Lalit Sen of Suket
