= Livia Manera Sambuy =

Italian author

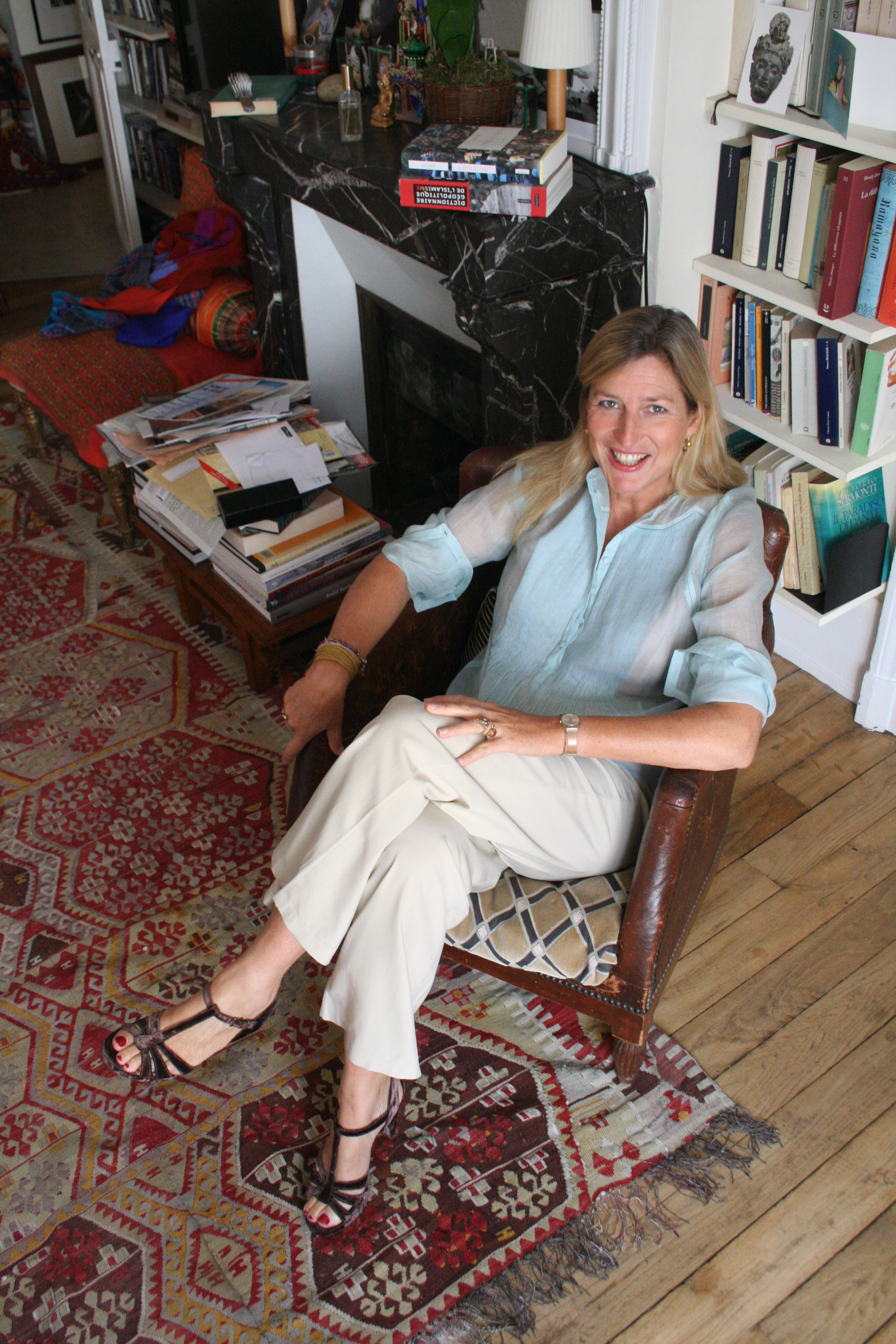

Livia Manera Sambuy (born 1958) is an Italian author and journalist. She is the author of In Search of Amrit Kaur (2023).

== Career ==
A cultural reporter and critic since the 1980s, Manera has been a staff writer for the Italian national newspaper, Corriere della Sera, and its literary supplement La Lettura, since 2000.

Her writings also appeared in The Believer, The Paris Review, and The New Yorker.

== Documentary Films ==
Manera co-authored and co-directed with French film director William Karel the documentary film Philip Roth sans complexe (2011). Philip Roth, known for his reclusive nature and avoidance of media appearances, rarely granted interviews, making his volunteering to participate in Manera's film project a rare and important occasion. “Facing the camera, without ever hearing the voiceof the Italian journalist, who managed the feat of extracting eight hours of interview from him, reduced to 53 minutes, the godfather of American literature looks back on his life and a literary career spanning more than half a century."

She also wrote and co-directed Philip Roth: Unmasked (2013). The New York Times' review of the movie stated: “Mr. Karel and Ms. Manera spent 10 days in his company, in New York and at his house in western Connecticut, and succeeded in putting him at ease. He is, for 90 minutes, marvelous company — expansive, funny, generous and candid.”

== Books ==
Manera's first book, Non Scrivere di Me (2015) is work of literary nonfiction that blends memoir with the profiles of eight North American writers. "I forbid you to write about me, intimates Philip Roth. For Livia Manera it should sound like a prohibition, but it is in fact an instigation to break down the barrier that divides human understanding and literary invention, it is a stimulus to activate the memory of self and the memory left by the many readings and key words that have opened the door to a territory where life and literature mingle (...) It is thus that the figures of Philip Roth, Richard Ford, Paula Fox, Judith Thurman, David Foster Wallace, Joseph Mitchell, Mavis Gallant, and James Purdy come to us, with a new transparency, but also, against the light, those of Raymond Carver, Mordecai Richler, and Karen Blixen." Non Scrivere di Me won the 2016 University of Camerino Special Award (UNICAM).

It was followed by In Search of Amrit Kaur (2023), which won the 2023 Capalbio International Award for Narrative Nonfiction. The book tells the story of a quest: an investigative journey to uncover the truth behind a Sikh princess’ secret life in Paris during World War II. According to a wartime letter received by a member of her family, Amrit Kaur, the Rani of Mandi, was arrested by the Gestapo in 1940, charged with selling her jewelry to help Jews leave the country, and died while imprisoned. Unexpectedly, the quest to uncover the full story behind these events becomes a journey of self-discovery for Manera."I couldn’t have imagined how far I would travel in pursuit of the truth about Amrit Kaur" she wrote. "I certainly didn’t think that my quest would take me from Paris and London to Mumbai, Pune, Amritsar and even Chicago; and from the plains of Punjab to the foothills of the Himalayas – and California."
