= Suket State =

Princely state of India

Coordinates: 31.53°N 76.88°E

Kingdom of Suket
- 765–1948
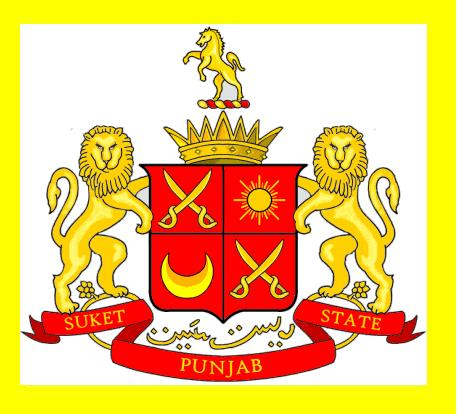
- Flag Coat of arms

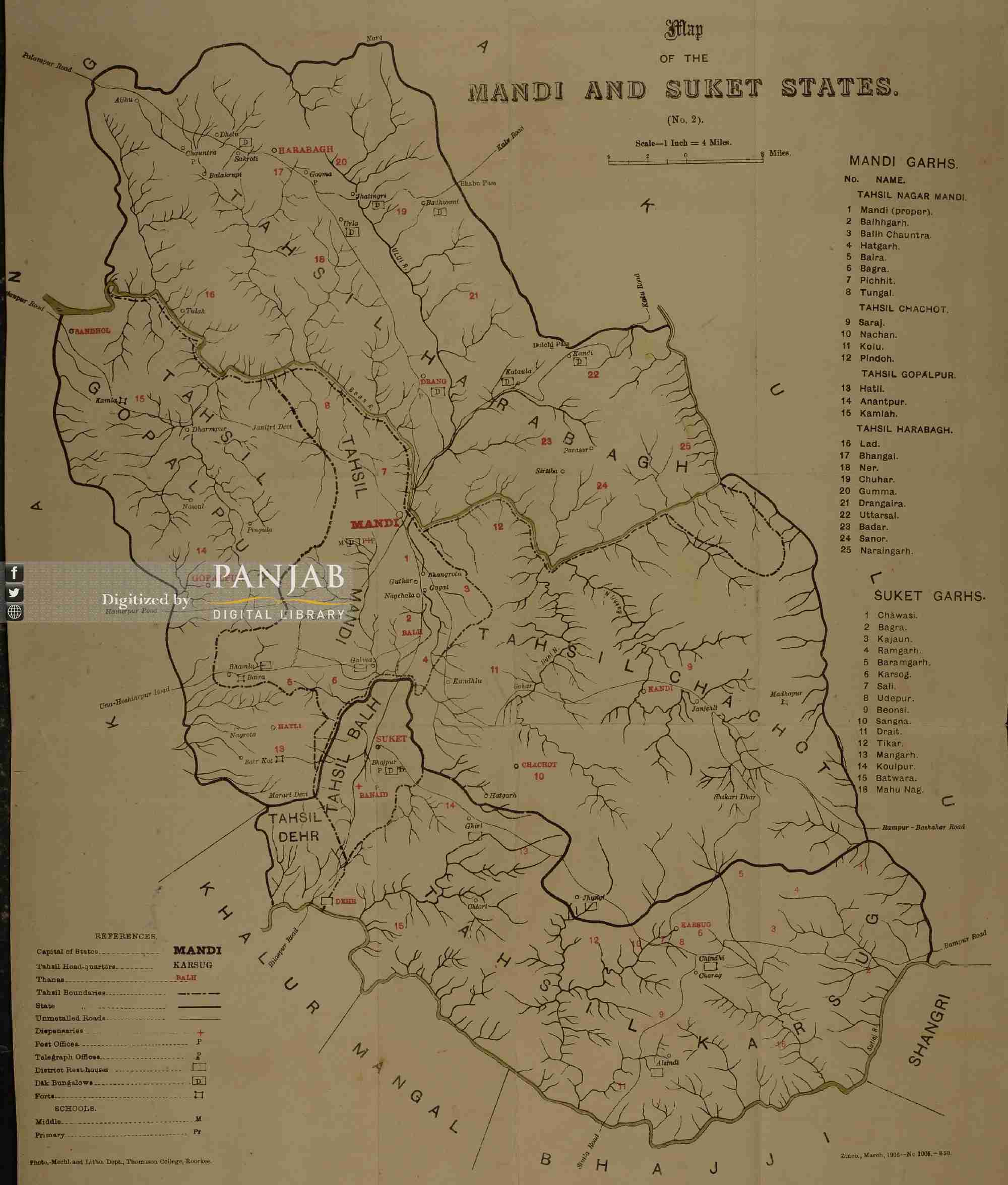
- Map of Mandi and Suket states, March 1906
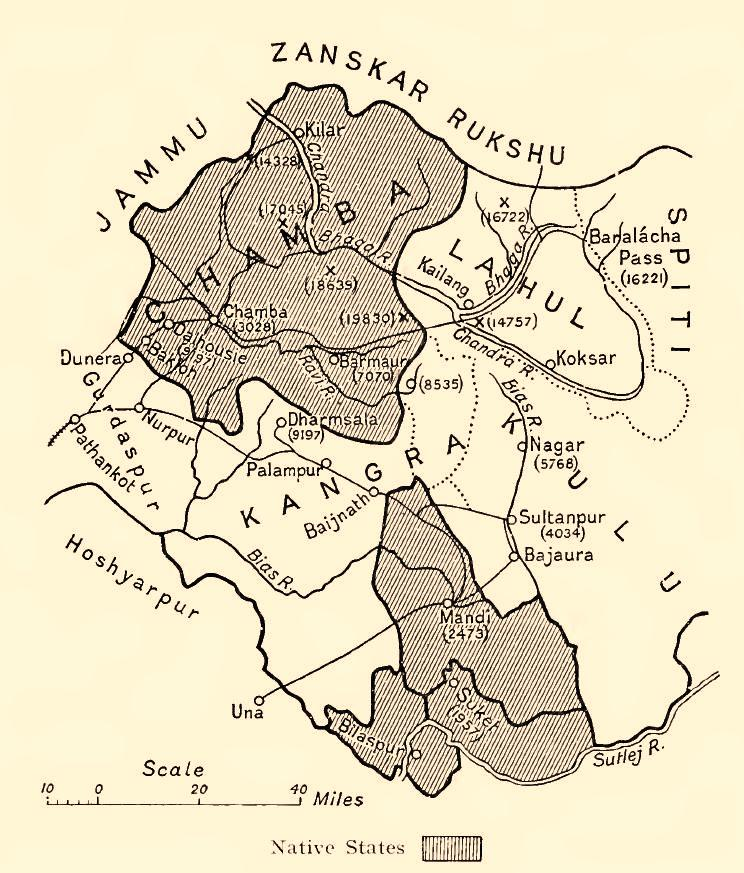
- Princely States of the Shimla Hills, Suket in the south (1911)
- Area
  - 1931: 1,088 km^{2} (420 sq mi)
- Population
  - 1931: 58,408
- History
  - Established: 765
  - Accession in Dominion of India: April 15, 1948
Succeeded by
Dominion of India
- Today part of: Himachal Pradesh, Republic of India

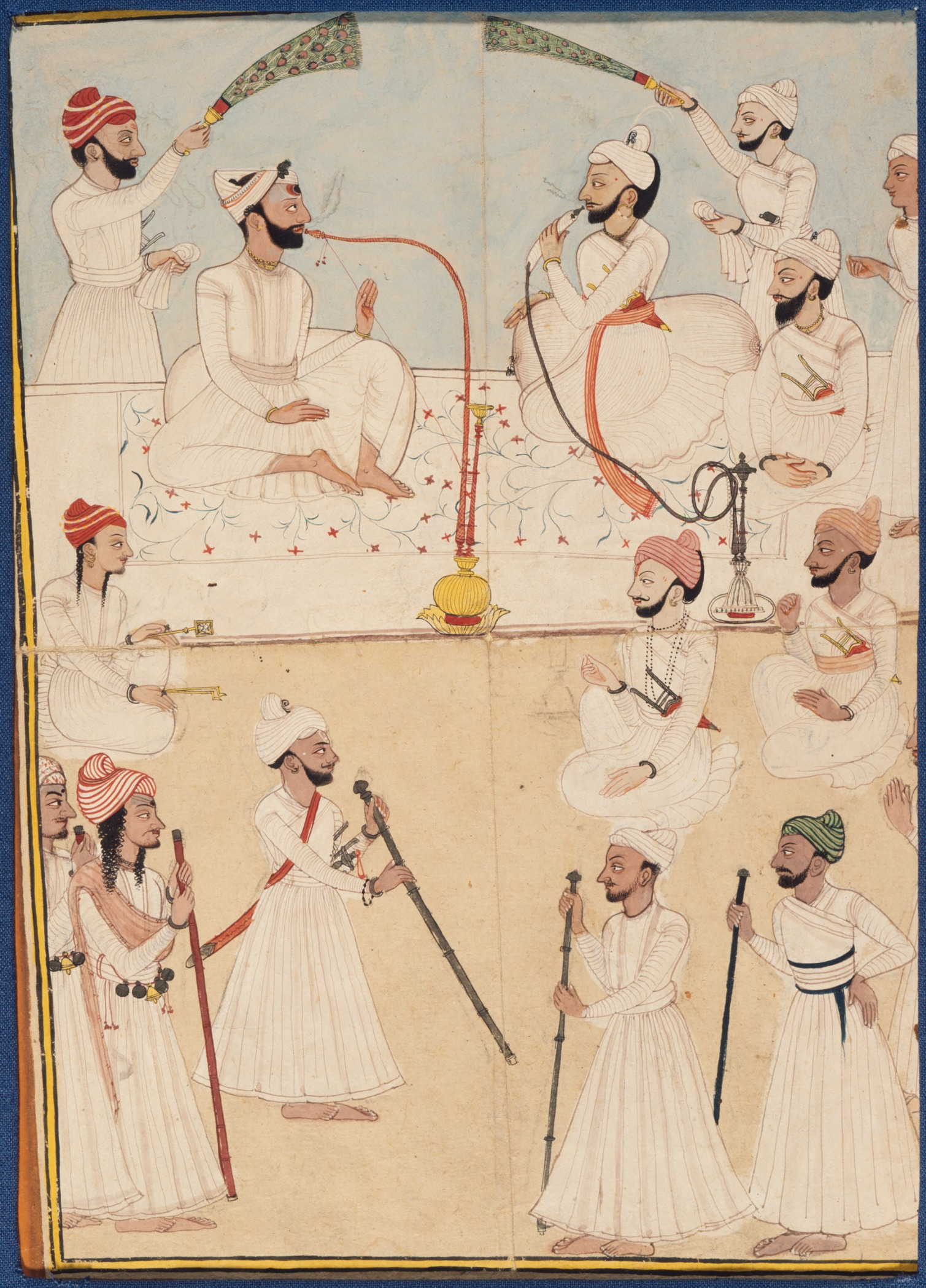
Raja Ranjit of Suket and Raja Shamsher Sen of Mandi in the Darbar; ca. 1772

Suket State was one of the princely states of India during the period of the British Raj. The capital of the state was Pangna. Its last ruler signed the accession to the Indian Union on 15 April 1948. Formerly it belonged to the States of the Punjab Hills and currently, it is part of the Indian state of Himachal Pradesh. The present-day Mandi district was formed with the merger of the two princely states of Mandi and Suket.

== History ==
According to tradition the predecessor state was founded by Bira Sen (Vir Sen), claimed to be a son of a Sena dynasty of Bengal. The early history of Suket was marred by constant warfare against other principalities, especially against the Kingdom of Kullu. At the time of Raja Bikram Sen, Kullu was under the overlordship of Suket State and was reduced to paying tribute to Suket. Raja Madan Sen's reign was the golden age of Suket, when its ruler reduced into submission the neighboring smaller states. During the reign of Raja Udai Sen Suket came under the influence of the Mughal Empire who were content with merely exacting tribute.

At the time of Raja Bikram Sen II, Sukket survived the invasion of the Gurkhas of Nepal (1803 to 1815) and the ensuing brief period of Sikh dominance thanks to the Raja's diplomatic skills. In 1845, when war broke out between the Sikhs and the British, the Rajas of Suket and Mandi took the side of the British, signing a Treaty of Alliance in Bilaspur in 1846. In the same year a sanad was granted to Raja Ugar Sen II confirming him and his heirs in the possession of the Suket territories.

The family goddess (kuldevi) or hut devi of the Rajas of Suket is at Jaidevi (known as rajrajeswari maa kamaksha). which is about 8 miles from Sundarnagar. All religious ceremonies in the royal family, e.g., Jarolan (hair-cutting ceremony), zanarbandi (the ceremony of investment with the sacred thread), etc., are performed at Jaidevi in the temple of the goddess. The Raja goes in a procession to the temple and offers bhel to the goddess on the occasion of these ceremonies.

=== Rulers ===
The rulers of Suket bore the title Raja. The clan name of the royal lineage was 'Suketi' or 'Suketr'.

Name	Portrait	Reign	Reference(s)
Raja Dip Sen		ca.1590 – ca.1620	
Raja Shyam Sen		ca.1620 – ca.1650	
Raja Ram Sen		ca.1650 – ca.1663	
Raja Jit Sen		ca.1663 – 1721	
Raja Garur Sen		1721–1748	
Raja Bhikam Sen		1748–1762	
Raja Ranjit Sen		1762–1791	
Raja Bikram Sen II		1791–1838	
Raja Ugar Sen II		1838–1876	
Raja Rudra Sen		1876 – Apr 1878	
Raja Arimardan Sen		1878–1879	
Raja Dasht Nikandan Sen		29 Mar 1879 – 27 May 1908	
Raja Bhim Sen		27 May 1908 – 12 Oct 1919	
Raja Lakshman Sen		13 Oct 1919 – 15 Aug 1947	

== Demographics ==
Religious groups in Suket State (British Punjab province era)
Religious group	1901		1911		1921		1931		1941	
Religious group	Pop.	%	Pop.	%	Pop.	%	Pop.	%	Pop.	%
Hinduism (Note: 1931-1941: Including Ad-Dharmis)	54,005	98.77%	54,268	98.8%	53,625	98.71%	57,616	98.64%	69,974	98.43%
Islam	665	1.22%	587	1.07%	659	1.21%	733	1.25%	884	1.24%
Sikhism	6	0.01%	71	0.13%	44	0.08%	44	0.08%	234	0.33%
Christianity	0	0%	2	0%	0	0%	1	0%	0	0%
Buddhism	0	0%	0	0%	0	0%	14	0.02%	0	0%
Jainism	0	0%	0	0%	0	0%	0	0%	0	0%
Zoroastrianism	0	0%	0	0%	0	0%	0	0%	0	0%
Judaism	0	0%	0	0%	0	0%	0	0%	0	0%
Others	0	0%	0	0%	0	0%	0	0%	0	0%
Total population	54,676	100%	54,928	100%	54,328	100%	58,408	100%	71,092	100%
Note: British Punjab province era district borders are not an exact match in the present-day due to various bifurcations to district borders — which since created new districts — throughout the historic Punjab Province region during the post-independence era that have taken into account population increases.

== See also ==
- Punjab States Agency
- Political integration of India
- Lalit Sen
- Hari Sen
- kamksha
- Rulers of Suket and Mandi
