= In Search of Amrit Kaur =

2023 book by Livia Manera Sambuy

In Search of Amrit Kaur: A Lost Princess and Her Vanished World is a literary nonfiction book about Amrit Kaur of Mandi, by the Italian author and journalist Livia Manera Sambuy, published by Farrar, Straus and Giroux on March 14, 2023. The book tells the story of a quest: an investigative journey to uncover the truth behind a Sikh princess’ secret life in Paris during World War II, that, unexpectedly, becomes a journey of self-discovery as well.

== Summary ==
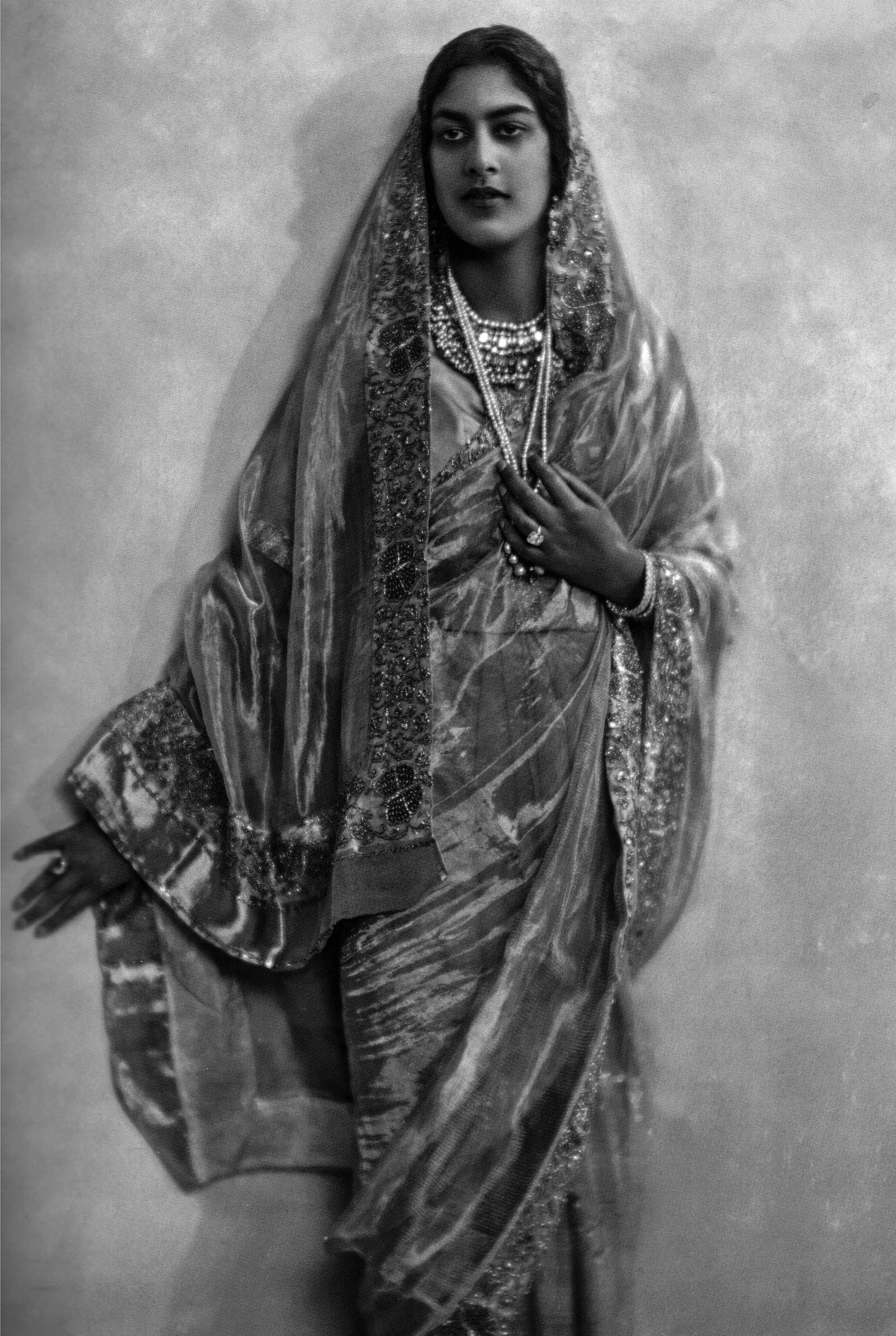
Maharani Amrit Kaur of Mandi.

In a museum in Mumbai, a chance viewing of a photograph of a Punjabi princess inspires Italian author and journalist, Livia Manera Sambuy, to investigate the Rani's life. The young, beautiful woman in the 1924 photograph is Her Royal Highness Rani Shri Amrit Kaur Sahib, only daughter of the Maharaja of Kapurthala. The day of the sitting, the newly married Rani was visiting London with her husband, the Raja of Mandi, and was received by King George and Queen Mary. According to the portrait's description, the princess had been educated in England and France, lived in Paris throughout the 1930s, and was arrested in Occupied France by the Gestapo in 1940, for selling her jewellery to help Jews leave the country. A wartime letter addressed to the princess’ stepmother - the former Spanish dancer Anita Delgado - stated that Amrit survived only one year in a Nazi concentration camp.

Manera makes some initial queries and calls Amrit's daughter in Pune, India, who is known as “Bubbles”. This genteel, elderly lady reveals that her mother died, not in a Nazi camp in 1941, but in London in 1948, having been released after six months of captivity. She also invites Manera to visit her in Pune.

The initial meeting with the 80-year-old Bubbles uncovers the threads of a rich story. Amrit was born into Indian royalty at the height of the British Raj, when the colonisers tolerated the maharajahs - once they renounced their authority. Among them, Amrit's father, Jagatjit Singh of Kapurthala, was the cosmopolitan ruler of a minor princely state, enamoured of French culture. He was also a great traveller, at home in Paris’ high society between the two World Wars. After India's independence in 1947, and after Prime Minister Indira Gandhi's abolition of the privy purses in 1971, Bubbles’ family, like many other former Indian royalties, found themselves in reduced circumstances.

Manera discovers that following Amrit's arranged marriage with an unsuitable partner, the princess became a vocal defender of women's rights, championing education for women and raising the minimum age for girls to marry. She also campaigned for the abolition of polygamy. However, this genteel politicking was not to last. When her husband took a second wife, Amrit endured the enlarged household for three years before fleeing to Europe in 1933. She left her two small children—Bubbles and her brother—behind, an action from which Bubbles was still nursing the pain.

Mystified by the enigma surrounding Amrit Kaur's abrupt departure from her family and the fate of her precious jewels, Manera travels between India, Europe and America to unearth the truth. She discovers that the rani's mysterious life was peopled with fascinating characters, both in the past and present, including Jewish bankers, Parisian jewellers, spies, socialites, royals, writers, and Nazis. However, the author's search in the French and British archives remains unsatisfying until the breakthrough comes via the serendipitous discovery of Amrit's original briefcase, mysteriously abandoned in a house in California in 1938. In that briefcase, Manera finds the letters and photographs that unravel the mystery of Amrit's final years and death.

A last trip to India takes the author to Pune to reveal her findings to Bubbles. As Manera watches the elderly lady reconcile with the memory of her mother, she thinks her mission is finally accomplished. Only later will she understand the profound, healing effect this journey of discovery has had on herself, too.

== Critical reception and reviews ==
Tunku Varadarajan of The Wall Street Journal wrote book as "most essential grace". “A forensic quest for ‘a lost princess and her vanished world’ . . . [In Search of Amrit Kaur is] both passionate and eloquent . . . [Sambuy's] project is [not] merely to solve a confounding mystery. It is . . . also an act of humanity, to help a heartbroken daughter reconnect with her mother after a lifetime of separation.”

Edmund de Waal, author of The Hare with Amber Eyes, called it: “Remarkable and compelling”, adding “I loved this book”.

Akemi Johnson of The New York Times Book Review wrote: "A tantalizing true story . . . [In Search of Amrit Kaur plunges] into the glittery world of Indian royalty”.

Kamila Shamsie, author of Home Fire: "Livia Manera Sambuy is a wonderful detective-companion to lead us through this rich and complex world of princesses and prisoners-of-war, love and deceit, secrets and discovery. Teeming with incident and character, In Search of Amrit Kaur is a thoroughly engaging read".

Jane Wallace, on the Asian Review of Books, wrote: “As Sambuy writes, who would have thought that the Holocaust and the end of the Raj would have intertwined in the life of a lonely princess? Mounted on the author’s own narrative arc, this biography is a many-faceted gem”.

Publishers Weekly wrote: “[Manera Sambuy’s] eloquent and poetic prose enlivens the searching historiography. Original and difficult to classify, [In Search of Amrit Kaur] is a pleasure to read”.

Judith Thurman, author of A Left-Handed Woman: "A luminous portrait of Amrit Kaur first beguiled Livia Manera in a dusty museum in Mumbai, and became an obsession. This beautiful Indian princess, she learned, had escaped her family, leaving behind an unfaithful husband, young children, and a feudal world where the reward for a woman's submission was unimaginable privilege. It took Manera years to reconstruct her story, and at every stage, on several continents, mysteries and obfuscations thwarted her. The truth, when she finally discovered it, came as a shock, and a revelation. And the result of her quest is an even more luminous portrait―of both Amrit Kaur, and Livia Manera―two exceptional women who had to question their assigned fates as daughters, wives, lovers, and mothers in order to define themselves."

Jhumpa Lahiri, author of Whereabouts shares that, "Nuanced but relentlessly curious, [Livia Manera Sambuy] has a gift not only for listening to other people’s stories but for probing and unfolding exceptional narratives. The Secret of Amrit Kaur—an ambitious, absorbing work that peels back the layers of its enigmatic subject and digs deeply into the author’s own emotional vicissitudes, is her crowning jewel.”

Larry Matthews of Washington Independent Review of Books wrote "As an author and former journalist trained to sniff out compelling stories, I asked myself what makes Kaur special enough to merit a book. Three hundred pages later, I still didn’t know the answer.",

Kirkus Reviews wrote: “In this elucidating . . . text, Italian writer Sambuy introduces readers to ‘a labyrinth . . . of unusual characters,’ spinning fanciful tales of collaboration, priceless jewels, and lost fortunes of the princes of the Raj. Weaving together biography and her personal narrative . . . [this is] an engaging . . . book, with twists, turns, and detours galore”.

The book has been also reviewed by Sushila Ravindranath of The Hindu, Abhrajyoti Chakraborty of Air Mail, and Neha Kirpal of Hindustan Times.
