= List of rulers of Suket and Mandi =

Rulers of an indian state in 1527

Suket was a state in India that preceded the princely state of Mandi, which was founded in 1527.

Formerly part of the Kingdom of Suket in the Punjab Hills, the Rajput dynasty traditionally goes back to 765 AD. In about 1100, Vijaya Sena had two sons, Sahu Sen, who ruled over power kingdom of Suket, and Bahu Sen, who settled in Manglore (Present day Banjar tehsil of Kullu).

Bahu Sen's descendants lived in Manglore area until the tenth descendant, Kabakha Sen, was killed by the Raja of Kullu, and his son had to flee to Suket, not very far from the present city of Mandi, Himachal Pradesh, which was founded during Ajbar Sen's rule.

== Rajas of Suket ==
- Raja Bahu Sen, 1st Raja of Suket, younger son of Raja Vijai Sen of Suket.
- Raja Nim Sen, 2nd Raja of Suket
- Raja Nirhabat Sen, 3rd Raja of Suket
- Raja Kahabat Sen, 4th Raja of Suket
- Raja Sammat Sen, 5th Raja of Suket
- Raja Bir Sen, 6th Raja of Suket
- Raja Samudra Sen, 7th Raja of Suket
- Raja Kesab Sen, 8th Raja of Suket
- Raja Malab Sen, 9th Raja of Suket
- Raja Jai Sen, 10th Raja of Suket
- Raja Kranchan Sen, 11th Raja of Suket 1278/1301, he was the first Raja to overthrow the authority of the Raja of Kullu; married the daughter of the Raja of Suket and had issue. He was killed by the Raja of Kullu in 1301.
- Raja Ban Sen, 12th Raja of Suket 1301/1346, born posthumously in 1301, he was adopted by his maternal grandfather, married and had issue.
- Raja Kalian Sen, 13th Raja of Suket (1300–1332 or 1346–1387), married and had issue.
- Raja Hira Sen, 14th Raja of Suket (1332–1360 or 1387–1405), married and had issue.
- Raja Dharitri Sen, 15th Raja of Suket (1360– or 1405–1425)
- Raja Narindar Sen, 16th Raja of Suket (1400– or 1425–1425)
- Raja Prajat Sen, 17th Raja of Suket (1440– or 1425–1470)
- Raja Dilawar Sen, 18th Raja of Suket (1470–1499), died 1499.
- Raja Ajbar Sen, 19th Raja of Suket (1499–1527).

1st Raja of Mandi 1527/1534, initially 19th Rana of Suket from 1499, he founded Mandi in 1527 and became the first Raja of Mandi, married and had issue. He died in 1534.

== Rajas of Mandi ==
- Raja Chhatar Sen, 2nd Raja of Mandi (1534–1554), married and had issue.
- Raja Sahib Sen, 3rd Raja of Mandi (1554–1575 or 1534–1554), married Rani Prakash Devi, daughter of the Raja of Bilaspur, and had issue.
- Raja Narain Sen, 4th Raja of Mandi (1575–1595 or 1554–1574)
- Raja Keshab Sen, 5th Raja of Mandi (1595–1616 or 1574–1604), married and had issue.
- Raja Hari Sen, 6th Raja of Mandi (1616–1637 or 1604–1637), married and had issue. He died 1637 or 1623.
- Raja Suraj Sen, 7th Raja of Mandi (1637–1664 or 1623–1658), married (amongst others), a daughter of Raja Jagat Singh of Nurpur, and had issue. He died March 1664.
- Kumari (name unknown), married 1658
- Raja Shyam Sen, 8th Raja of Mandi (1664–1679 or 1658–1673), married and had issue. He died in 1673 (or 1679), when five Ranis, two concubines and 37 slave girls committed sati.
- Raja Gaur Sen, 9th Raja of Mandi (1679–1684 or 1673–1678), married (amongst others), a daughter of Raja Budhi Chand of Sirmur, and had issue, as well as illegitimate issue. He died 1684.
- Raja Sidhi Sen, 10th Raja of Mandi (1684–1727 or 1678–1719), married and had issue. He died 1727.
- Tikka Shiv Jawala Sen, married (amongst others), a daughter of the Rana of Hatli, and had issue. He died in 1703 or 1722.
- Raja Shamsher Sen (by a daughter of the Rana of Hatli)
- Raja Shamsher Sen, 11th Raja of Mandi (1727–1781), born 1722, married (amongst others), the daughter of Raja Ugar Singh of Chamba, and had issue. He died 1781.
- Raja Surma Sen, 12th Raja of Mandi (1781–1788), married and had issue, as well as illegitimate issue. He died 1788.
- Raja Ishwari Sen, 13th Raja of Mandi (1788–1826), born 1784, married 1stly, a daughter of Mian Fateh Chand Katoch, married 2ndly, a daughter of Raja Uggar Singh of Bashahr. He died in 1826.
- Raja Zalim Sen, 14th Raja of Mandi (1826–1839). He died in June 1839.
- Raja Balbir Sen, 15th Raja of Mandi (1839–1851), born about 1817, married several wives, and had issue, as well as illegitimate issue. He died 26 January 1851.
- Raja Bijai Sen, 16th Raja of Mandi (1851–1902), born 1846; married 1stly, 21 July 1859, a daughter of Raja Jagat Chand of Datarpur, married 2ndly, 25 July 1859, a daughter of Raja Jai Singh of Guler, married 3rdly, (name unknown), married 4thly, a sister of Mian Kishan Singh Guleria, married 5thly, a daughter of Mian Jagat Singh, married 6thly, a daughter of Mian Hira (or Udham) Chand of Datarpur, and had issue, as well as natural issue. He died 10 December 1902.
- Raja Bhawani Sen, 17th Raja of Mandi (1902–1912), born 17 April 1883, educated at Aitchison Chiefs College, Lahore; married 1stly, a daughter of Kanwar Balbir Singh of Sirmur, married 2ndly, a daughter of Mian Surat Singh of Suket, married 3trdly, 1907, Rani Lalit Kumari, died 4 May 1938, daughter of Raja Prithvi Dhwaj Shah, Talukdar of Khairigarh-Singhai, and had issue. He died on 9 February 1912.

=== Interregnum 1912–1913 ===
- Maj. HH Raja Sir Joginder Sen Bahadur, 18th Raja of Mandi (1913–1986), son of Mian Kishan Singh Sahib, born 20 August 1904, educated at Queen Mary's College and Aitchison College, Lahore; Indian Ambassador to Brazil 1952–1956; Member of Lok Sabha 1957–1962; Honorary Lt.-Col. 3rd/17th Dogra Regiment and Bengal Sappers and Miners, married 1stly, about 1911, a daughter of Thakur Devi Singh of Delath, married 2ndly, 8 February 1923, HH Rani Amrit Kaur Ahluwalia, born 1904, died 1948, daughter of Col. HH Farzand i-Dilband Rasikhul-Itiqad Daulat-i-Inglishia Raja-i-Rajgan Maharaja Sir Jagatjit Singh Bahadur Ahluwalia of Kapurthala, and his wife, Rani Kanari, married 3rdly, 13 May 1930, Kumari Kusum Kumari [HH Rani Kusum Kumari of Mandi], born 27 August 1913, died June 1998, daughter of Kunwar Prithiraj Sinhji of Rajpipla, and had issue, two sons and two daughters. He died 16 June 1986.

=== Present Raja of Mandi ===
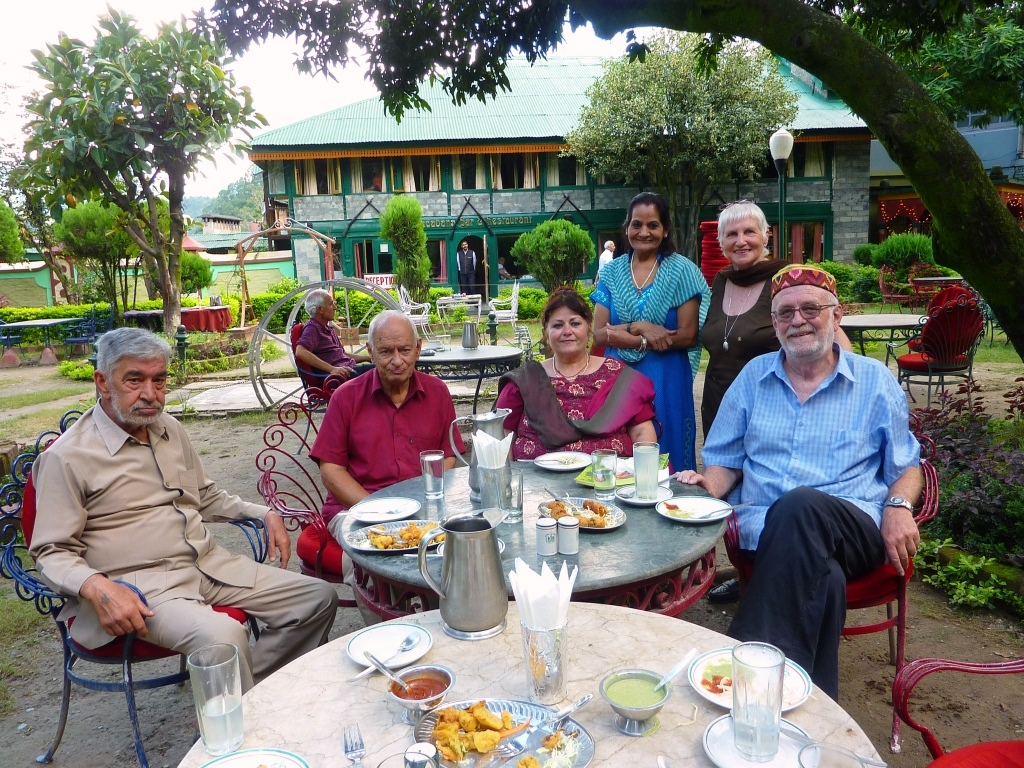
HH Raja Sri, and Rani Vina, son and guests. Mandi Palace grounds. 2010

- HH Raja Ashokpal Sen, 19th (1986–2021)
