= Pran Chopra =

Indian journalist, writer and editor

- Born: January 1921; Lahore, British India
- Died: 22 December 2013 (aged 92); New Delhi, India
- Occupations: Journalist, writer, editor
- Employer: The Statesman

Pran Chopra (January 1921 – 22 December 2013) was an Indian journalist, political analyst and newspaper editor.

Chopra was born in 1921 in Lahore, British India. He began his career as a journalist in 1941, with the Civil and Military Gazette, and in the mid-1940s was a war correspondent for All India Radio.

In his journalism career spanning over 60 years, Chopra worked for The Hindu and The Tribune and produced two magazines, The Citizen and The Weekend Review, but is most commonly associated with The Statesman after he became the newspaper's first Indian chief editor after its transfer from British ownership in the early 1960s. He was fired from The Statesman in the late 1960s for refusing to reflect the attitude of the paper's management to the United Front government in West Bengal.

From the late 1990s, he was a freelance journalist and writer, who wrote, edited or contributed to over a dozen books on Indian and South Asian politics and democracy.

He died on 22 December 2013, aged 92, after a short illness.
