= Mandi State =

Princely state of India

Coordinates: 31°42′25″N 76°55′54″E

Mandi State मण्डी रियासत
- 1290–1948
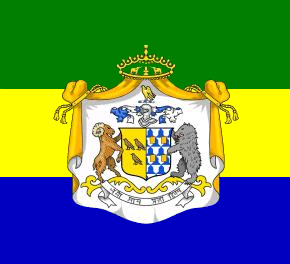
- Flag

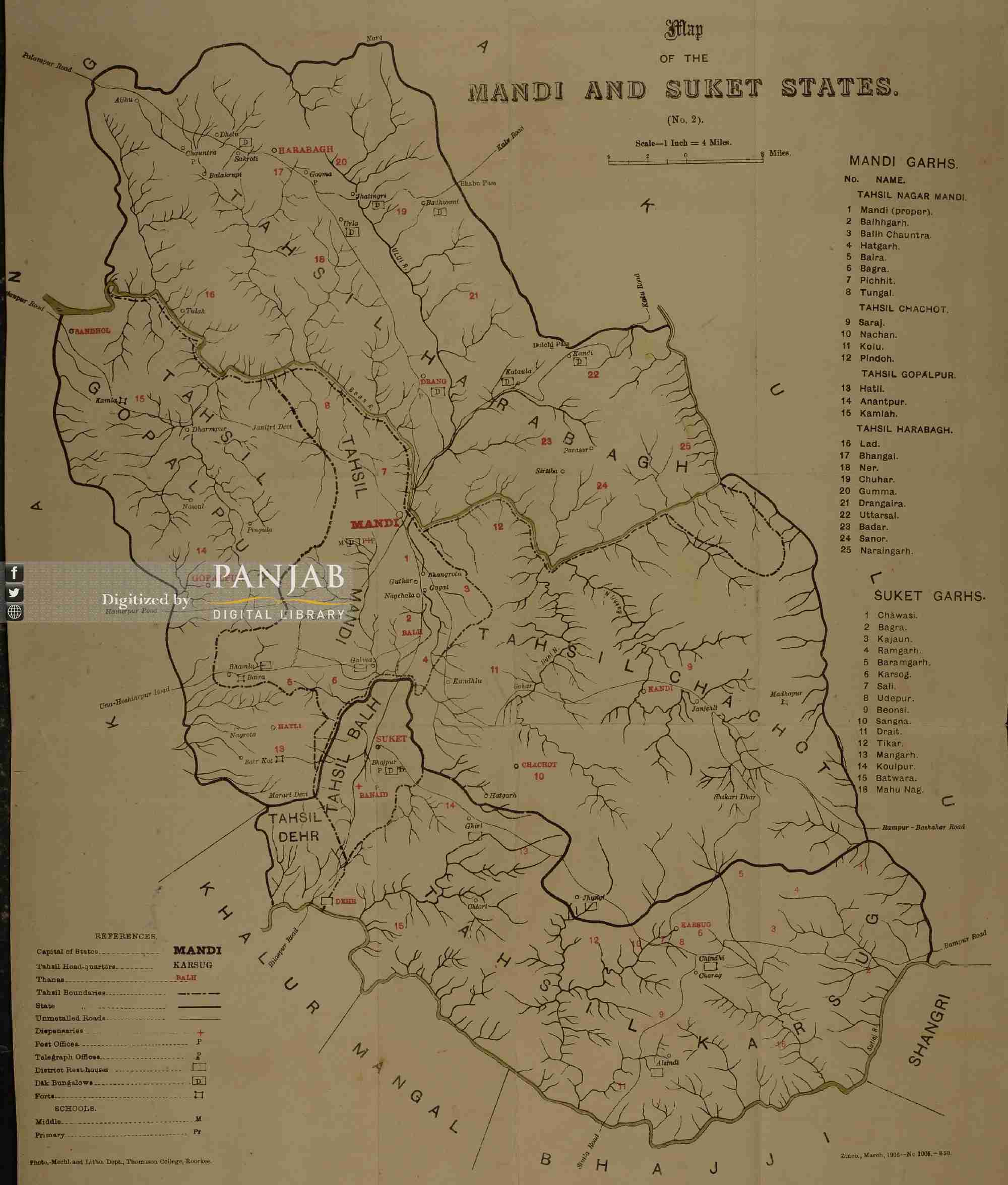
- Map of Mandi and Suket states, March 1906

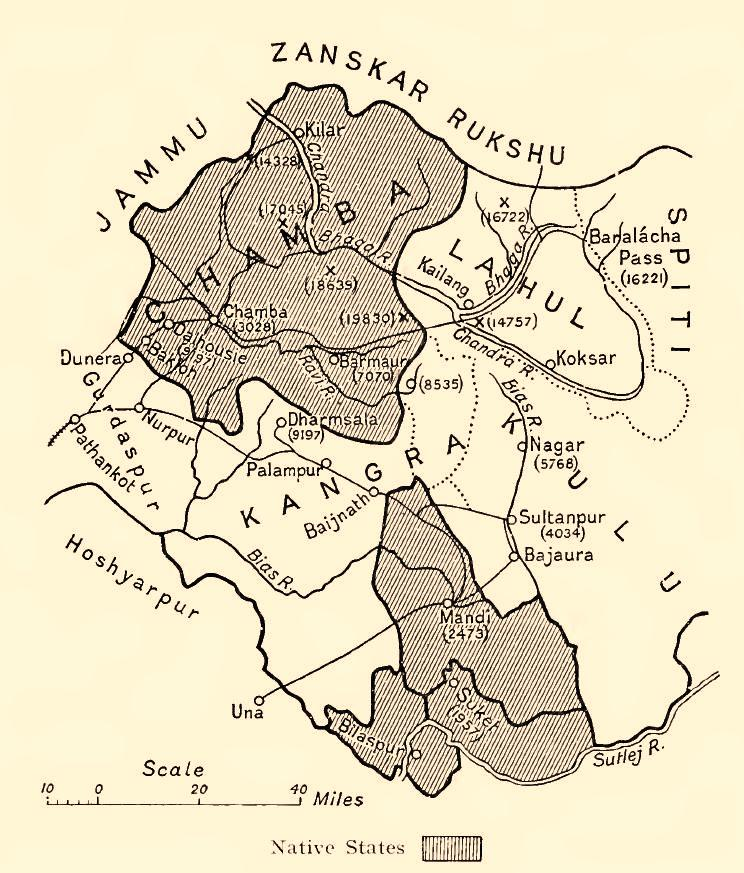
- Princely States of the Shimla Hills, Mandi in the south (1911)
- History
  - Established: 1290
  - Acceded to the Indian Union: 1948

Area
- 1941: 2,950 km^{2} (1,140 sq mi)

Population
  - 1941: 232,598
Succeeded by
India
- Today part of: Himachal Pradesh, India

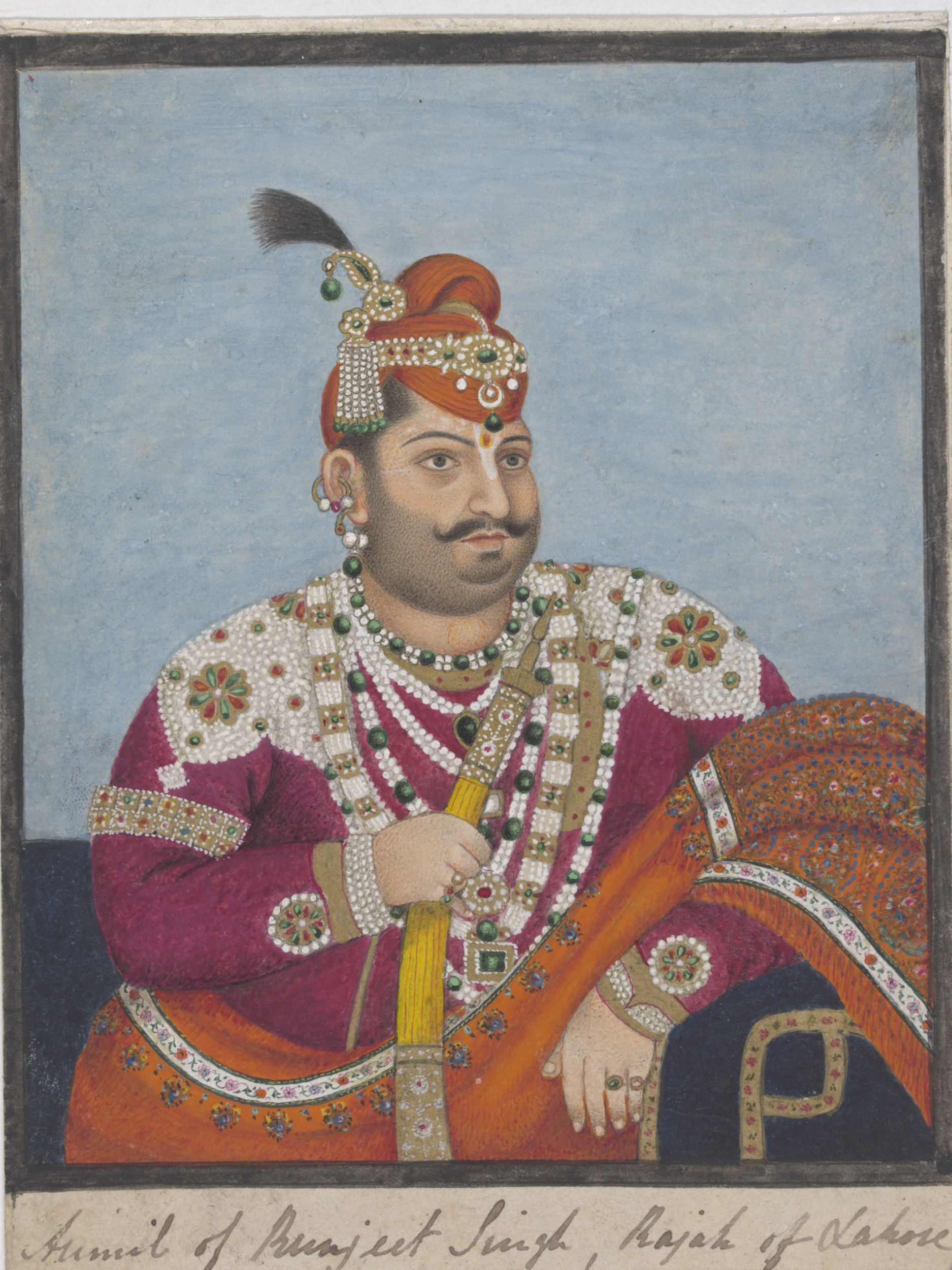
Portrait of Ishwari Sen of Mandi

Mandi State was a princely state in British India, with the town of Mandi as its capital. The state of Mandi (the name means "market" in Hindi), which included two towns and 3,625 villages, was part of the States of the Punjab Hills. It was located in the Himalayan range, bordering to the west, north, and east on the British Punjabi district of Kangra; to the south, on Suket; and to the southwest, on Bilaspur. As of 1941, population of Mandi State was 232,598 and area of the state was 1,139 square kilometres (440 sq mi). A sanad issued dated 24 October 1846 established a subsidiary alliance between Mandi and the British.

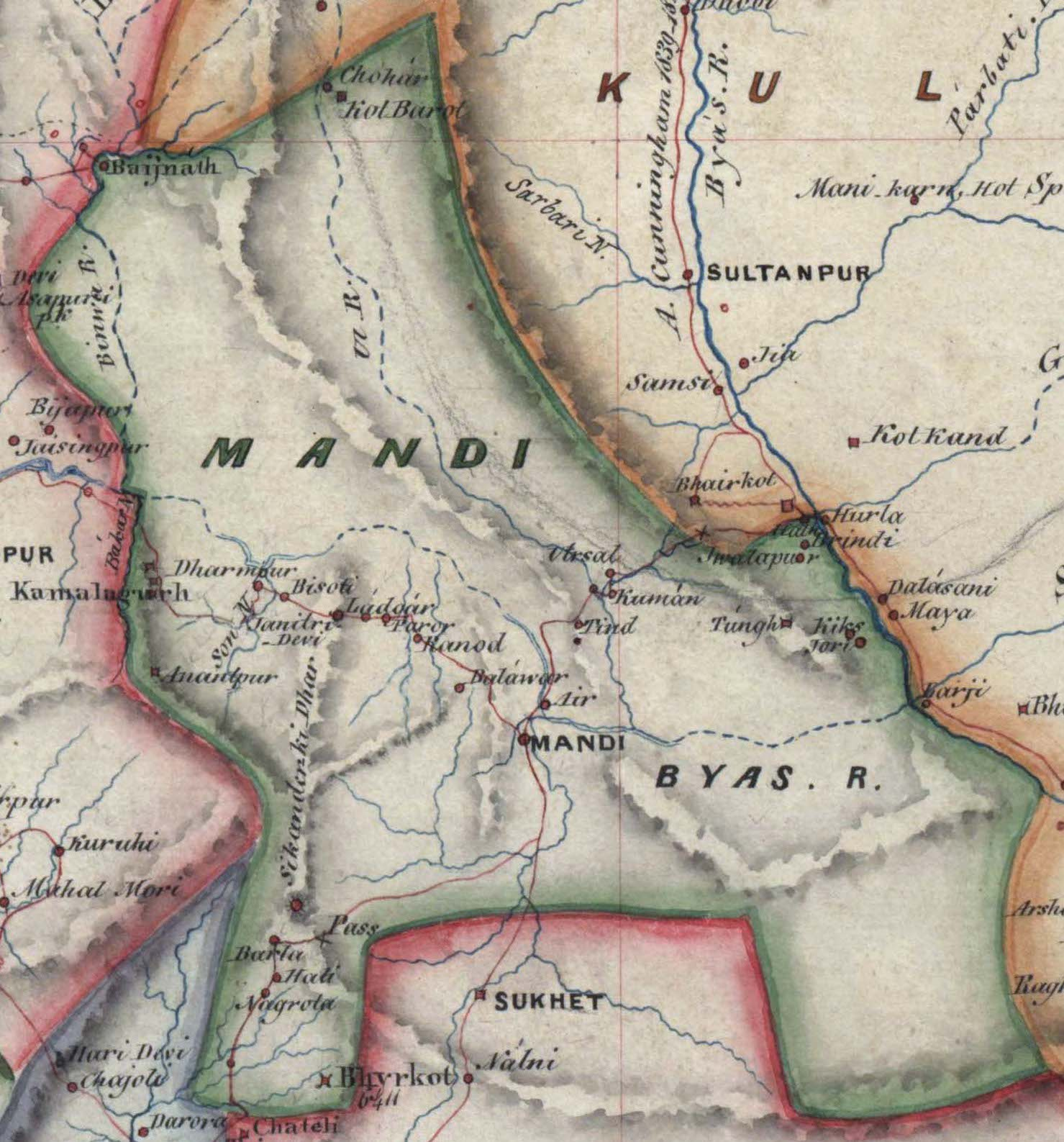
Detail of the territory of Mandi State from a map of the various Hill States of the Punjab Hills region, copied in 1852

== Fraternal split and foundation of Mandi ==
Around 1100 AD, Vijaya Sen, the ruler of Suket, had two sons: Sahu Sen, who succeeded him as the Raja of Suket, and Bahu Sen. A dispute arose between the brothers over succession and authority. Unable to resolve their differences, Bahu Sen left Suket permanently and moved to Manglore (Present day Banjar tehsil of Kullu) where he established his own independent territory and was recognized as a local Rana or chief. This separation is traditionally regarded as the origin of the Mandi State, and Bahu Sen’s descendant Ajbar Sen later founded the city of Mandi.

== List of rulers ==
The rulers bore the title of Raja.

List of rulers of Mandi State
Name	Portrait	Tenure	
Name	Portrait	Reign start	Reign end
Raja Ajbar Sen		1527	1534
Raja Chhatar Sen		1534	1554
Raja Sahib Sen		1554	1575
Raja Narain Sen		1575	1595
Raja Keshab Sen		1595	1616
Raja Hari Sen		1616	1637
Raja Suraj Sen		1637	1664
Raja Shyam Sen		1664	1679
Raja Gaur Sen		1679	1684
Raja Sidhi Sen		1684	1727
Raja Shamsher Sen		1727	1781
Raja Surma Sen		1781	1788
Raja Ishwari Sen		1788	1826
Raja Zalim Sen		1826	1839
Raja Balbir Sen		1839	1851
Raja Bijai Sen		1851	1902
Raja Bhawani Sen		1902	1912
Joginder Sen Bahadur KCSI		1913	1948

== Demographics ==
Religious groups in Mandi State (British Punjab province era)
Religious group	1901		1911		1921		1931		1941	
Religious group	Pop.	%	Pop.	%	Pop.	%	Pop.	%	Pop.	%
Hinduism (Note: 1931-1941: Including Ad-Dharmis)	170,304	97.85%	178,115	98.35%	181,358	98.01%	199,935	96.37%	227,463	97.79%
Islam	3,187	1.83%	2,799	1.55%	3,462	1.87%	6,351	3.06%	4,328	1.86%
Buddhism	510	0.29%	164	0.09%	76	0.04%	138	0.07%	208	0.09%
Sikhism	41	0.02%	26	0.01%	142	0.08%	899	0.43%	583	0.25%
Christianity	3	0%	4	0%	10	0.01%	141	0.07%	11	0%
Jainism	0	0%	2	0%	0	0%	0	0%	0	0%
Judaism	0	0%	0	0%	0	0%	1	0%	0	0%
Zoroastrianism	0	0%	0	0%	0	0%	0	0%	0	0%
Others	0	0%	0	0%	0	0%	0	0%	0	0%
Total population	174,045	100%	181,110	100%	185,048	100%	207,465	100%	232,593	100%
Note: British Punjab province era district borders are not an exact match in the present-day due to various bifurcations to district borders — which since created new districts — throughout the historic Punjab Province region during the post-independence era that have taken into account population increases.

== See also ==
- List of Indian princely states
- Rulers of Suket and Mandi
