= Lalit Sen =

Indian politician

Member of Parliament, Lok Sabha
- In office 1962-1971
- Preceded by: Joginder Sen
- Succeeded by: Virbhadra Singh
- Constituency: Mandi, Himachal Pradesh

Personal details
- Born: 21 April 1932 Shimla, Punjab, British India (now Himachal Pradesh, India)
- Died: 18 October 1985 (aged 53) Delhi
- Party: Indian National Congress
- Spouse: Kirshna Kumari

Lalit Sen (21 April 1932 - 18 October 1985) was an Indian politician from Himachal Pradesh. He was elected to the Lok Sabha, the lower house of the Parliament of India, from the Mandi constituency, as a member of the Indian National Congress.

He was a student of Bishop Cotton School, Shimla and did his degree from St. Stephen's College, Delhi.

His father was Raja Lakshman Sen Bahadur, the last ruling king of the erstwhile princely state of Suket. Upon his father's death, Lalit Sen became the 51st titular Raja of Suket. After Lalit Sen's death his son Hari Sen, an academic historian by profession, nominally succeeded him to the throne of Suket.
