= Kamaksha =

Kamaksha temple
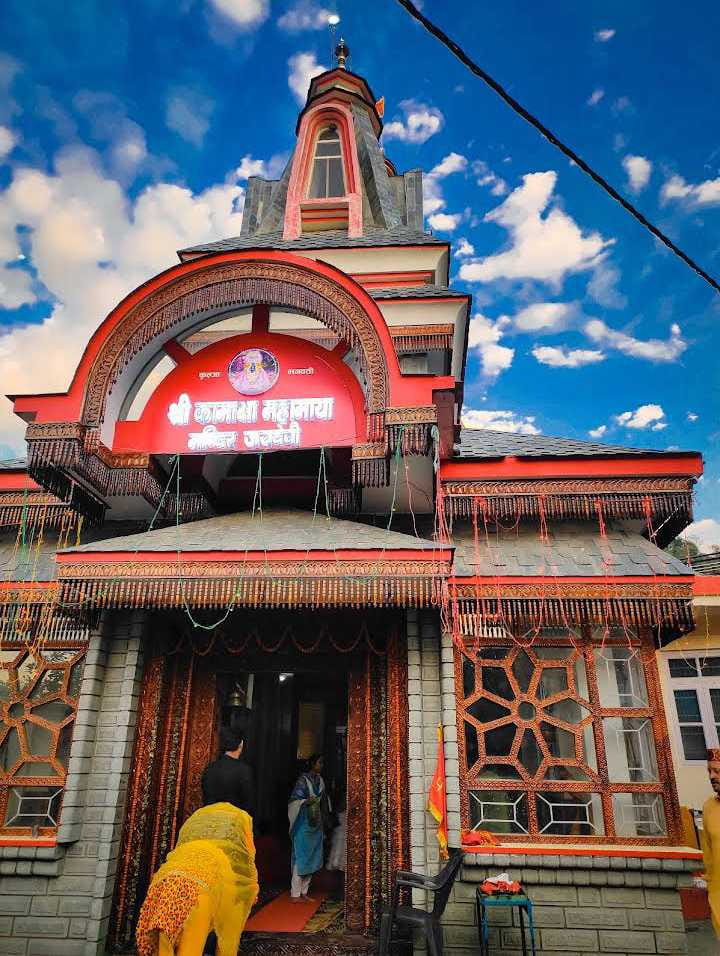
- Kamaksha temple

- Location in Jaidevi

Religion
- Affiliation: Hinduism
- District: Mandi
- Deity: Kamaksha ,kamakhya
- Festivals: Suket Fair, Navratri, Durga Pooja

Location
- Location: Jaidevi
- State: Himachal Pradesh
- Country: India
- Interactive map of Kamaksha temple
- Coordinates: 31.50061°N 76.95657°E

Architecture
- Completed: 12th–21st centuries

Specifications
- Temple: 2
- Monument: 4

Website
- https://www.jaidevi.in/

Kamaksha means the goddess who fulfills all kinds of desires. Kamaksha is considered the embodiment of the Hindu goddess Mahishasuramardini.

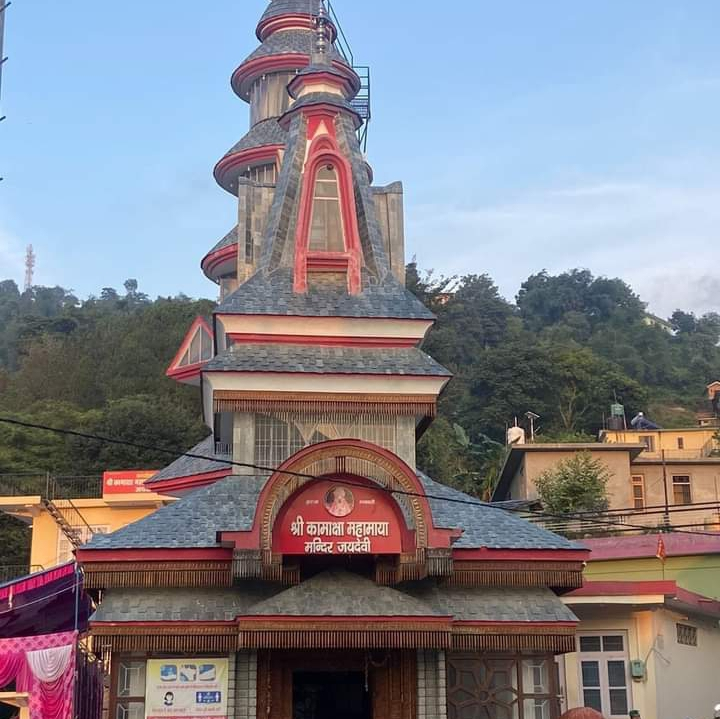
Kamaksha mata temple Jaidevi
