= Jaidevi =

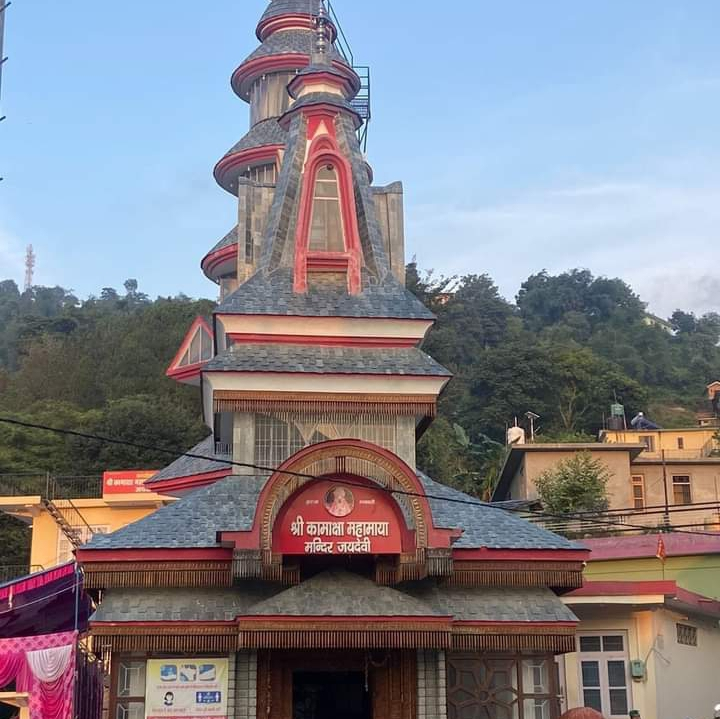

- Location in Himachal Pradesh, India
- Country: India
- State: Himachal Pradesh
- District: Mandi
- Elevation: 1,185 m (3,888 ft)

Population
  - Total: 5,000

Languages
  - Official: Hindi
- Time zone: UTC+5:30 (IST)
- PIN: 175031
- Nearest city: Sundernagar
- Lok Sabha constituency: Mandi
- Website: https://www.jaidevi.in/

Jaidevi is a small village in Mandi District in Himachal Pradesh. It is situated 13 km off the National Highway that connects Chandigarh and Manali, NH-21. It is also en route to Karsog which is a small but important town of Mandi District.

The name of the village derives from the temple of Kamaksha. Kamaksha is also kul devi of King Of Suket The ancient temple is highly revered and visited by thousands of devotees. It is also the family deity of the erstwhile raja (ruler) of Suket state which was merged in the state of Himachal Pradesh in April 1948. The village is situated at an elevation of about 1,200 m above the sea level and is surrounded by thick pine forest which really makes its ambiences scenic and worth of visiting. The view of Kamrunag and Shikari mountains is breath taking from here. There is a government senior secondary school Jaidevi, Post office, an ayurvedic dispensary Jaidevi and branch of the State Bank of India Jaidevi in the village.

The population of the village (Panchayat) is about 5,000. The village population is mainly dependent on agriculture and the chief crop of the village is maize.

== Jaidevi ==
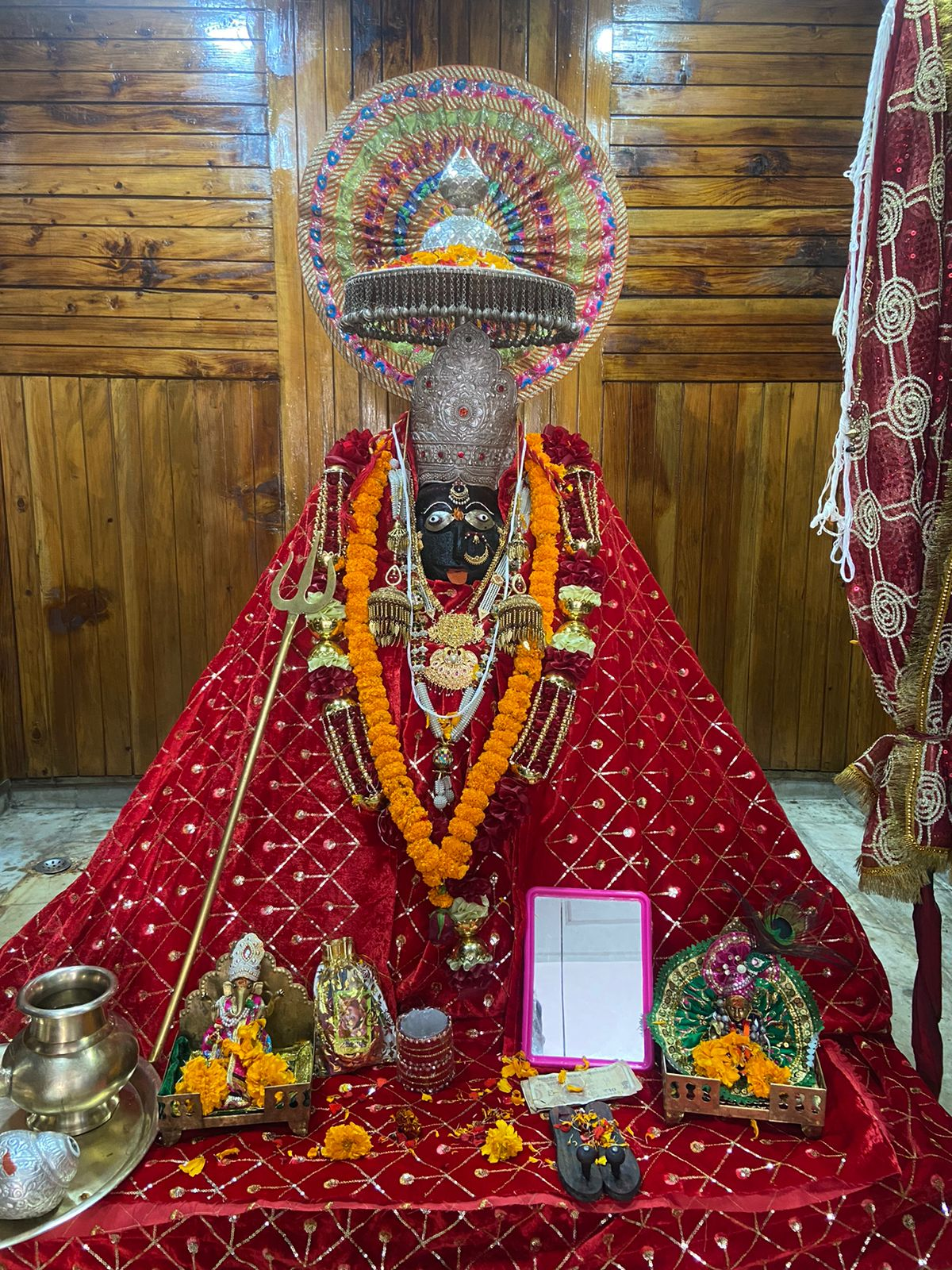
Kamaksha mata Jaidevi

Jaidevi is name derived from of hindu goddess. The king family of suket raj pariwar called kuldevi to jaidevi mata. According to beliefs, it is said that when the Suket rulers shifted their capital from Pangna to Lohara and then to Kartarpur (Old Market), the idol of the goddess was installed in Jai Devi. This place was named Jai Devi only after the goddess was installed.
