= Sikhism in South America =

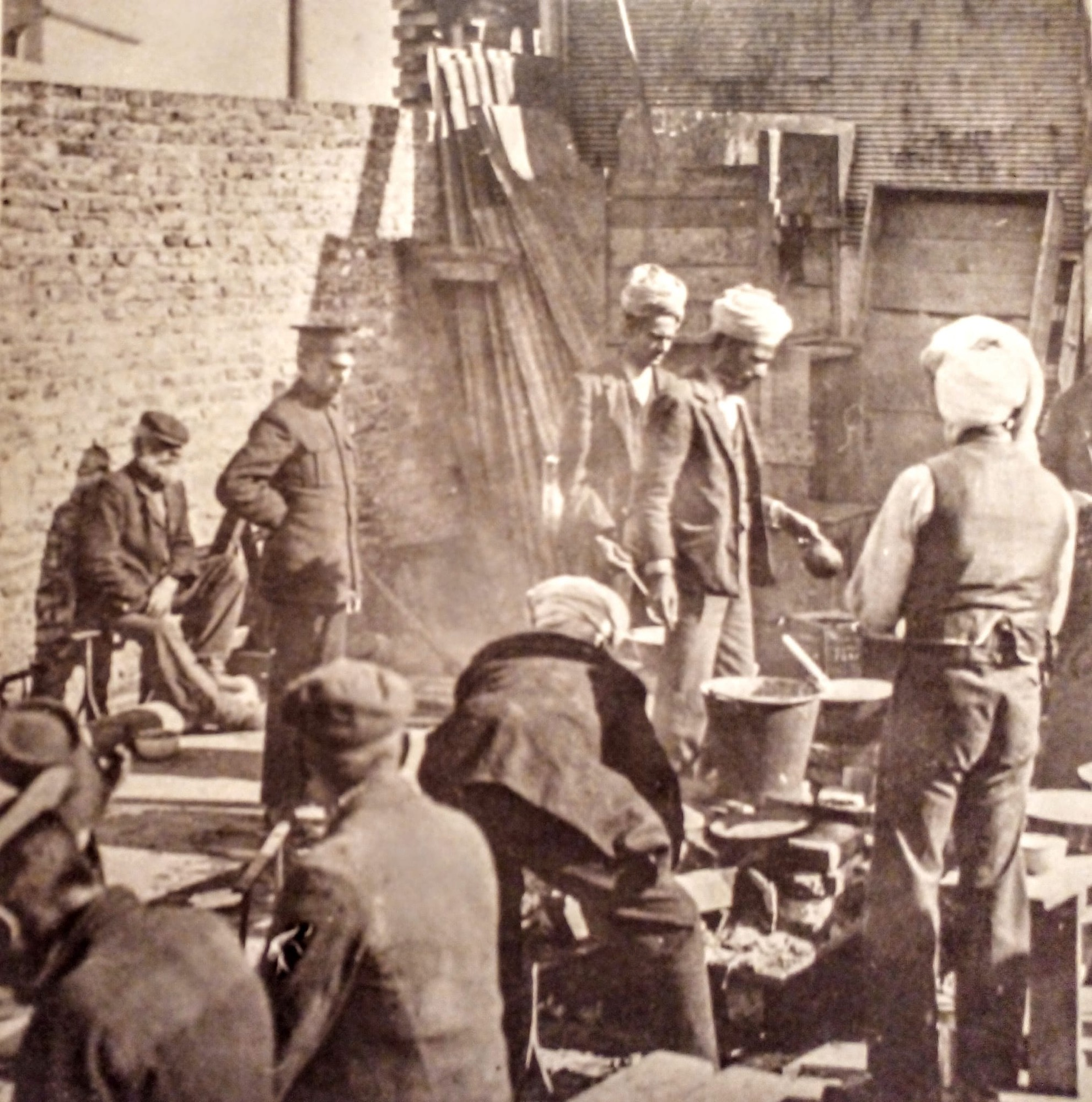
- Sikh Workers in Argentina (Circa 1912)

Regions with significant populations
- Chile: 500 or fewer
- Argentina: 300
- Brazil: 300
- Peru: 8 (Note: 454 Overseas Indians in Ecuador (including those of Indian origin). Sikhs are 1.7% of India, at lowest they are 8 persons)
- Ecuador: 6 (Note: 355 Overseas Indians in Ecuador (including those of Indian origin). Sikhs are 1.7% of India, at lowest they are 6 people)
- Bolivia: 1 (Note: 60 Overseas Indians in Ecuador (including those of Indian origin). Sikhs are 1.7% of India, at lowest they are 1 persons)

Languages
- Punjabi • Spanish • Portuguese • Hindi • Urdu • other languages

Sikhism is a minority religion in South America, which is estimated to be less than 0.01% of the total continent's population.

While the Sikh community in Argentina has been established since the early 20th century, its growth in South America has been relatively modest compared to the broader Sikh diaspora in Europe, North America, Asia and Oceania. Current estimates suggest a population of around 300 Sikhs in Argentina, 500 in Chile and 300 in Brazil, indicating a stable but small presence in the continent.

== Presence by country ==
=== Argentina ===
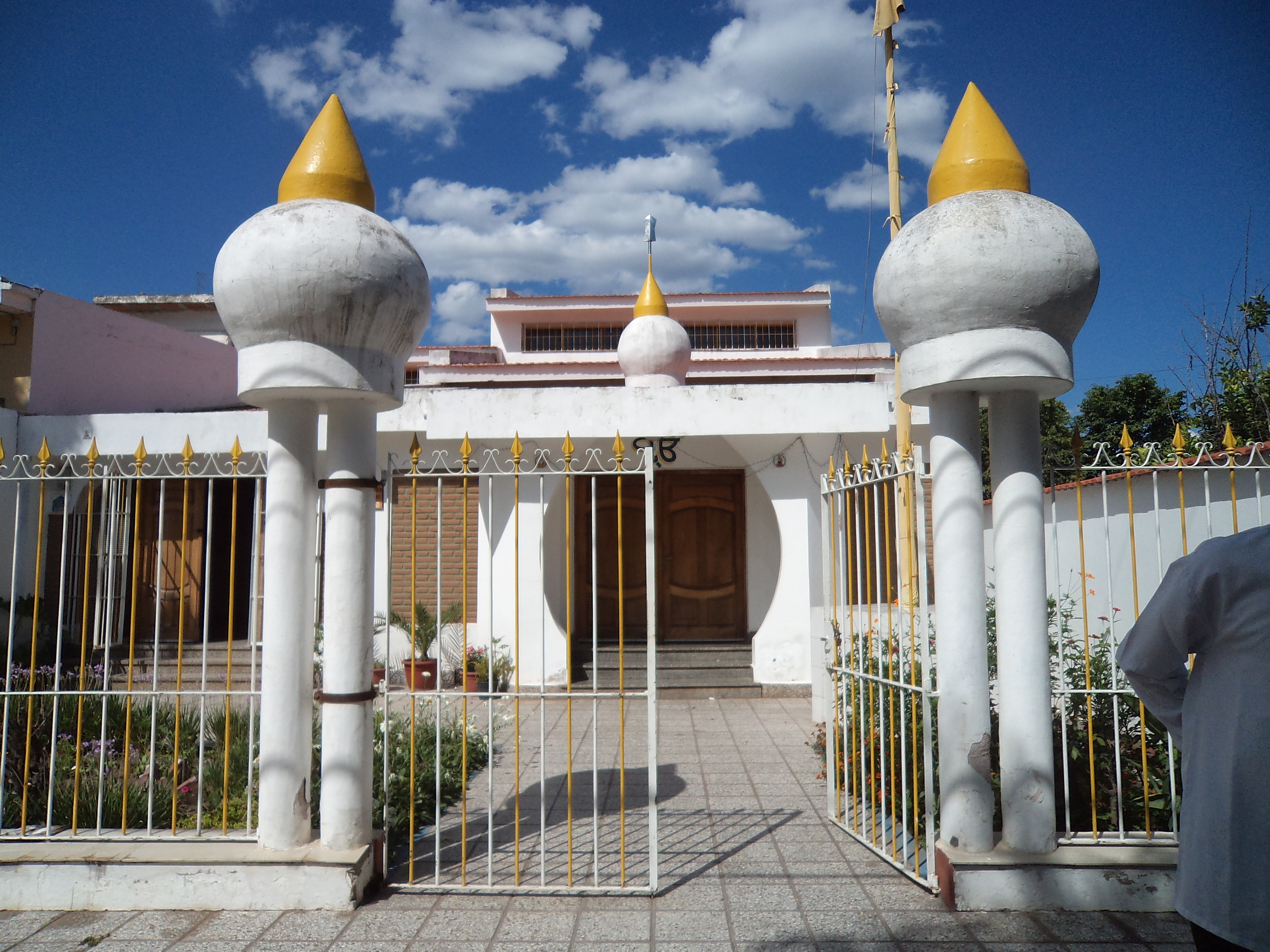
Gurdwara Rosario de la Frontera in Rosario, Argentina

Sikhs in Argentina, numbering around 300, primarily settled in the early 20th century, migrating away from anti-Asian immigration policies in North America. While travelling on British Colonial passports, they initially arrived to work on railways and sugar mills, they faced significant racism, prompting restrictions on their immigration.

In the 1930s, members of the Ghadar Movement visited to support their struggle for Indian independence. By the late 20th century, notable figures emerged, such as Simmarpal Singh, a prominent businessman. The community now owns various businesses and has established one Gurdwara in Rosario. In 2018, the Sikh faith was officially recognized in Argentina.

=== Bolivia ===
In the 1980s, a group of Sikhs migrated to Bolivia, particularly to the Santa Cruz de la Sierra area, seeking better opportunities in agriculture. Initially successful due to their strong work ethic, irrigation skills, and access to credit, they cultivated crops like sugarcane.

However, when crop yields declined and internal disputes arose, many faced financial difficulties, leading to defaults on loans, some even being jailed, and others returning to Punjab. Over time, the community dwindled, with only a few Sikhs remaining, struggling to make a living through small businesses or farming. By the early 2000s, their numbers and financial stability had declined so much that they could no longer maintain a Gurdwara, though they still occasionally gather when visitors arrive.

=== Brazil ===
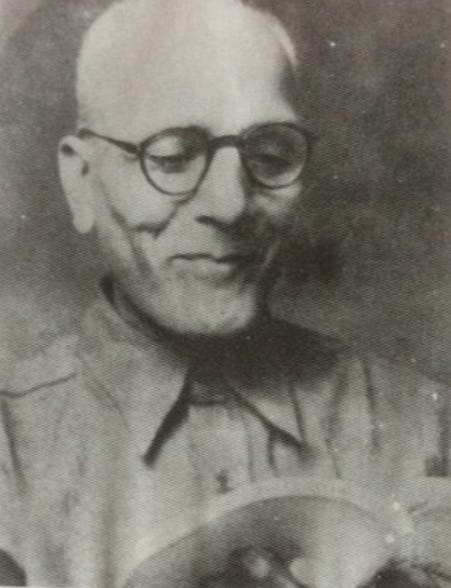
Uncle of Bhagat Singh and Ghadar Party member, Sardar Ajit Singh in Rio De Janeiro, Brazil. He had previously kept a turban and beard but removed both to disguise himself (Circa 1910)

Sikhs in Brazil, numbering around 300, began arriving in the early 20th century, primarily settling in the southern state of Paraná while often en route to Argentina. Also during this period, members of the Ghadar Movement also located to Brazil for a short period including Sardar Ajit Singh.

In 2018 delegation that visited the Golden Temple in Amritsar to advocate for gender equality within Sikh practices. Most Brazilian Sikhs belong to the 3HO community or are descendants of Punjabi migrants, many of whom have married outside their culture due to the small Sikh population. The community has established several gurdwaras, with the Shri Arjun Dev Sahib Gurdwara in Curitiba being the largest and most prominent.

=== Chile ===
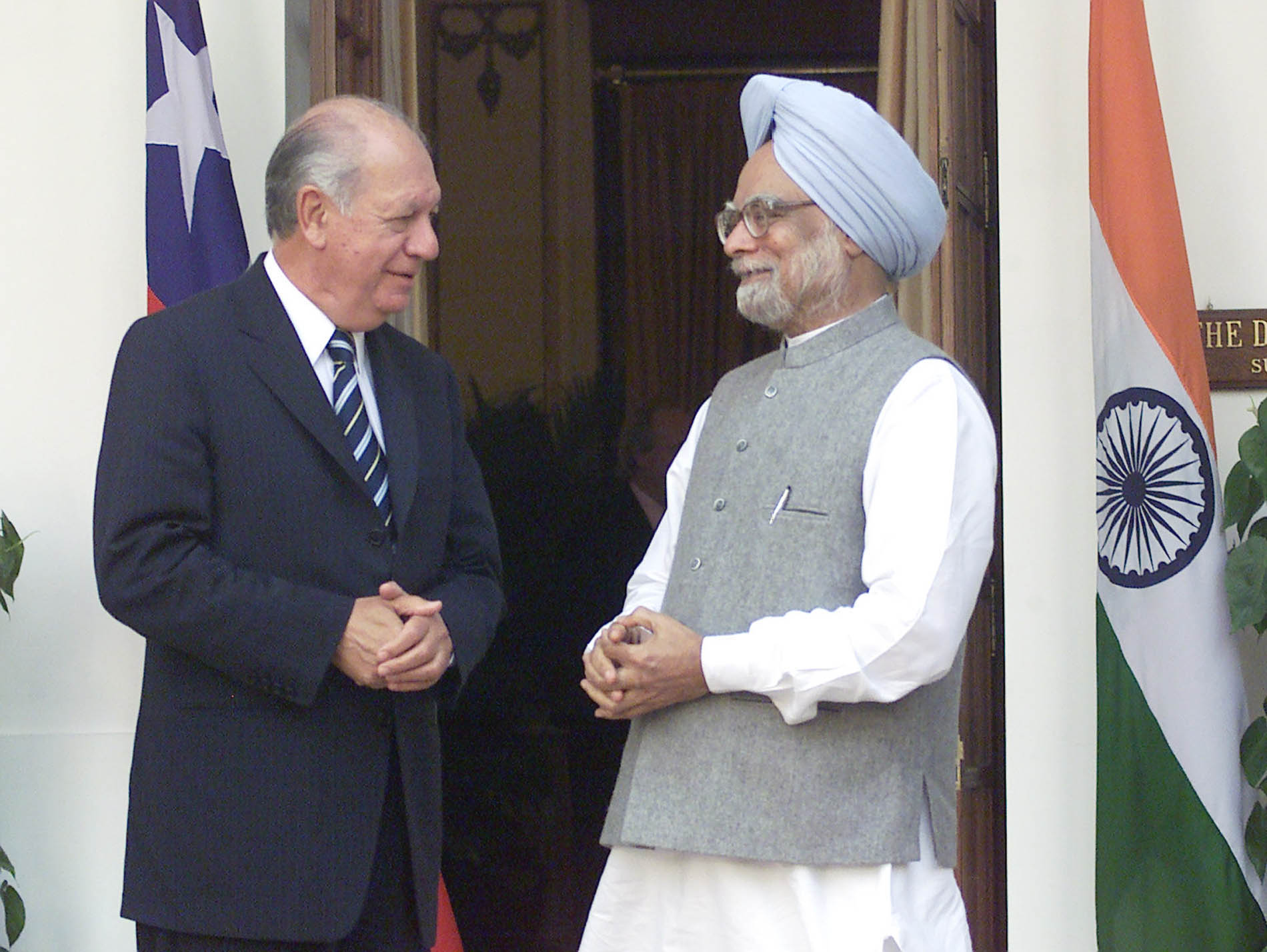
The First Sikh Prime Minister of India, Dr. Manmohan Singh with Former President of Chile, Mr. Ricardo Lagos Escobar (20 January 2005)

Sikhs in Chile, estimated to number fewer than 500, form a small religious minority. Their arrival began in the early 1900s as they sought work on railway projects connecting to Bolivia, often moving on to Argentina due to anti-Asian immigration policies in North America. In the late 20th century, Yogi Bhajan introduced Sikhism more widely through Kundalini yoga, gaining popularity in the 1960s.

In 2016, Sikhism was officially recognized as a religion in Chile, the first such acknowledgment in South America, allowing Sikhs to wear the Kirpan and pursue religious projects. Currently, there are two gurdwaras in Chile, one in Iquique, which shares space with a Hindu temple, and the Gurdwara Guru Ram Das Ashram in Viña del Mar, where the Nishaan Sahib was first raised in 2019. Local organizations like Sikh Dharma Chile and Langar Chile further support the community.

=== Colombia ===
There is a small Sikh presence in Colombia, mainly from converts. Most of the followers are part of the 3HO community.

=== Ecuador ===
In the mid-1980s, there were reports of interactions between some members of the Ecuadorian government and Sikh separatists advocating for Khalistan, a proposed Sikh homeland. Carlos Arosemena, the former President of Ecuador and leader of the Partido Nacionalista Revolucionario with Sikh separatist leader Jagjit Singh Chohan in London in August 1985. During this meeting, Arosemena reportedly suggested that Ecuador could serve as a suitable location for a Sikh nation.

Atma Singh Khalsa, a Sikh convert and believed to be the first Sikh resident in Ecuador, was part of Arosemena's entourage during this period. Additional delegates, including Dr. Cristobal Montero and Patricio Buendia, also expressed support for the Sikh cause.

However, the Ecuadorian government later distanced itself from these statements, clarifying that it had no official contact with or recognition of any Sikh separatist movements. The Minister of External Affairs commented on the situation, noting reports that Chohan had received an invitation to visit Ecuador. In December 1985, Chohan claimed that a significant number of Sikhs had migrated to Ecuador within a few months.

=== Peru ===
It is estimated that there are fewer than 10 Sikhs in Peru, with Partap Singh being the only head of a Gursikh family in the country. Originally moving to Peru as a tourism specialist, he married a local woman settled in Peru . Singh was honoured as the flag bearer during Peru's Independence Day celebrations. Notably, there is no Sikh Gurdwara in Peru.

== Presence by dependencies and other territories ==
=== Falkland Islands ===
There are no Sikhs residing in the Falkland Islands. However, Sikhs in the British Army often visit as part of military training. Lance Corporal Manpreet Singh Lally, a communication system engineer with the Royal Signals, was posted to the British Forces South Atlantic Islands (BFSAI) and showcased the tying and wearing of the traditional headdress to children at Mount Pleasant School.

== See also ==
- Sikhism in Argentina
- Sikhism in Brazil
- Sikhism in Chile
- Religion in South America
- Sikhism in Mexico
- Sikhism in Panama
