= Indo-Brazilian =

Indo-Brazilian may refer to:

- As an adjective, anything concerning Brazil–India relations
- Indian immigration to Brazil
- Brazilians in India
- the Indu-Brasil breed of cattle
