= Sikhism in Argentina =

Sikhism in Argentina Sijs en Argentina

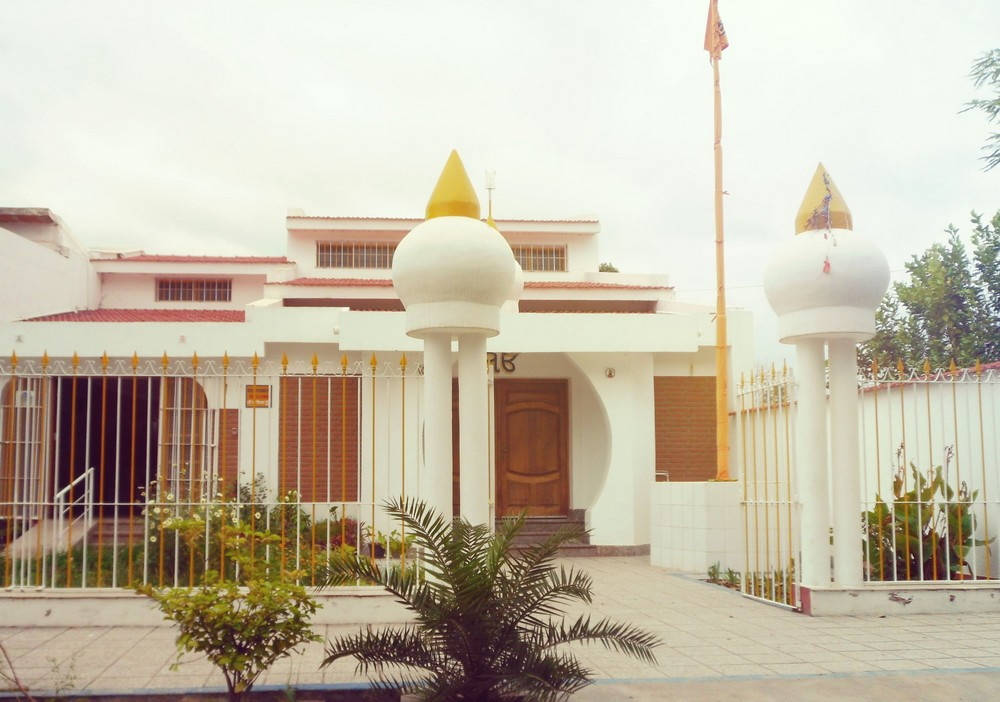
- Rosario Gurdwara in Argentina.

Total population
- 300

Regions with significant populations
- Buenos Aires · Rosario

Religions
- Sikhism

Languages
- Rioplatense Spanish • Punjabi • Hindi • Urdu

Sikhs in Argentina are a religious minority in Argentina and there are estimated to be around 300 Sikhs living in the country.

== History ==
=== Early 20th Century ===
==== Early Immigration ====
Sikhs in Argentina largely settled in the late 1890s and early 1900s to work on the railway lines to connect to Bolivia or on the British sugar mills. Many Sikhs faced many issues in settling in Canada and USA in the early 1900s because of the anti-Asian immigration policy of United States and the Canadian whites-only policy. Thus, many Sikhs were pushed to travel to Argentina in search of economic opportunities. A large number of Sikhs initially arrived in Brazil before reaching Argentina.

==== Racism ====
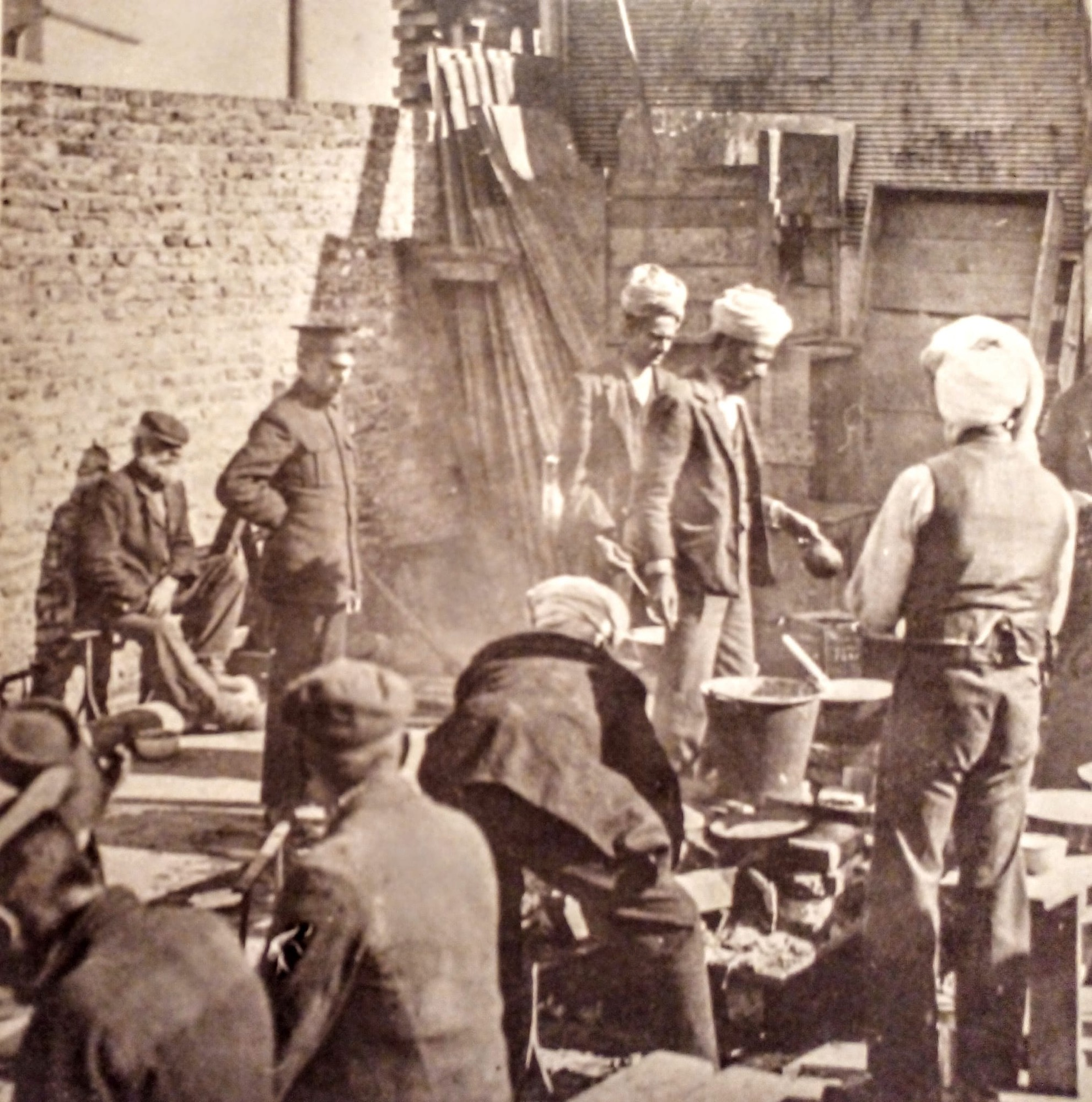
Sikh Workers in Argentina (Circa 1912)

The influx of Sikh laborers in 1912, along with Japanese and Chinese immigrants in the preceding years, triggered significant responses from Argentine politicians and immigration officials. These reactions resulted in entry restrictions, efforts to exclude them from the labour market, and diplomatic exchanges with British imperial authorities.

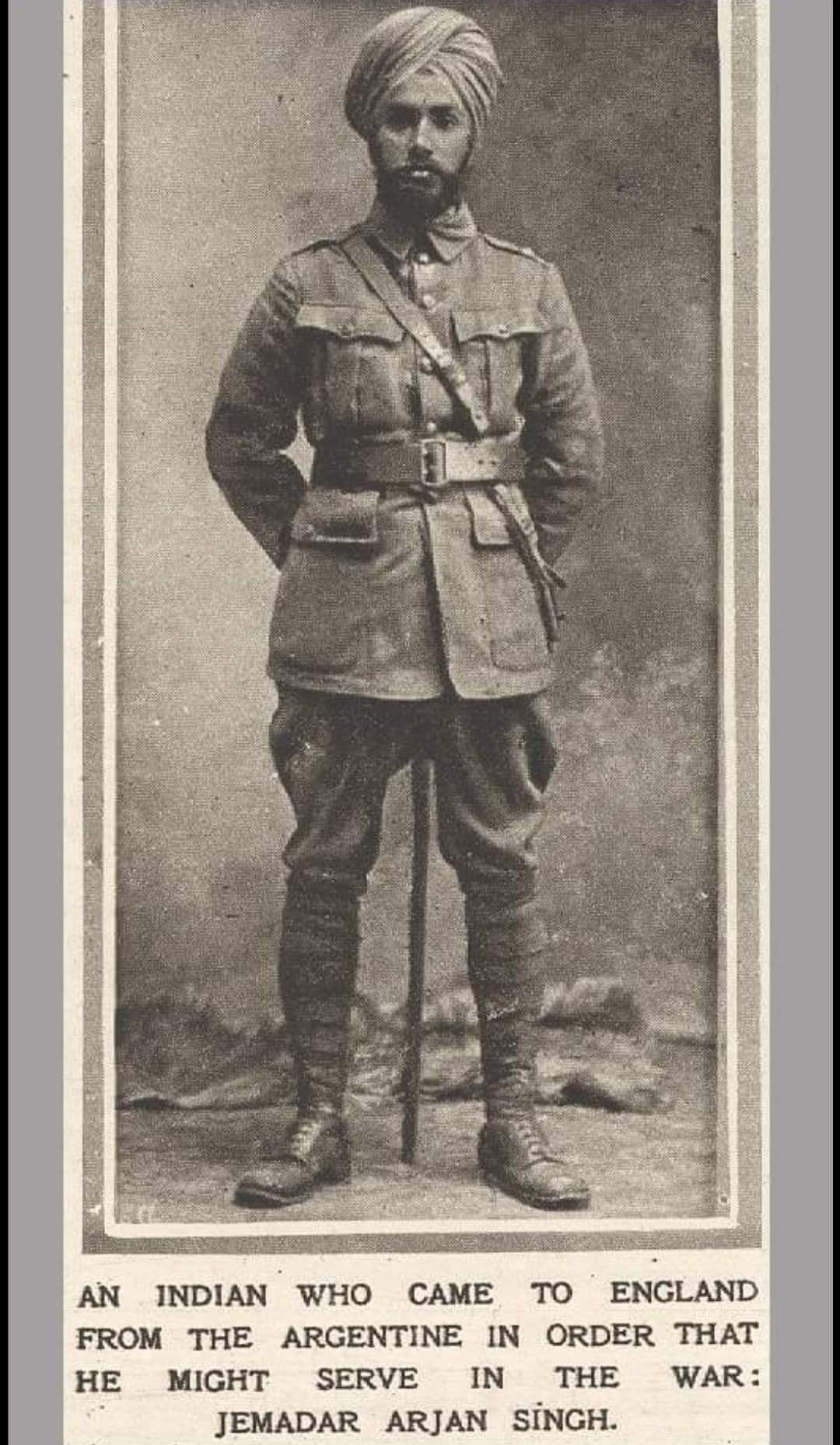
Arjan Singh, a Sikh residing in Argentina who travelled to the United Kingdom shortly after the outbreak of the First World War to join the army (1914)

In 1912, British Diplomat Reginald Tower wrote ‘On the subject of the immigration of Sikhs into the Argentine Republic, I have the honour to report that the Director General of Immigration, Senor Manuel Cigarraga, addressed a letter on the 21st instant to each of the foreign shipping companies represented in this Capital, urging them to refuse passages to any Asiatics to the Argentine Republic.’

==== Ghadar Movement ====
For the struggle of Indian independence from British rule, office-bearers of the Ghadar Movement had visited the Argentine Sikhs in the 1910s to 1930s. Notable individuals such as Sardar Ajit Singh also visited during this period.

==== Research ====
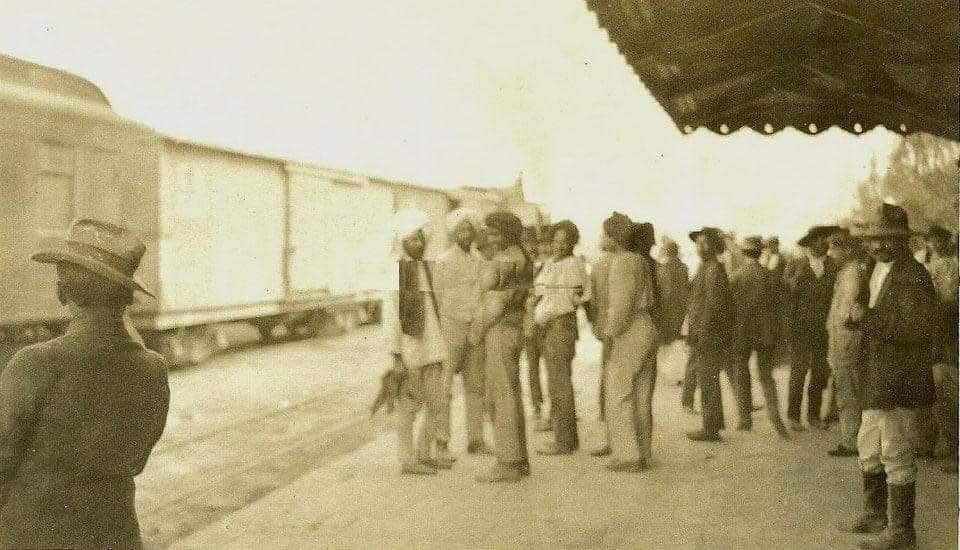
Sikh Sugar Mill Workers in San Pedro, Jujuy Province, Argentina (1912)

Sikhs in Latin America, including detailed research into Argentina, have been the subject of academic research as well.

Academic Swaran Singh, provides a comprehensive overview of the history and culture of Sikhs in his book "Sikhs in Latin America: Travels Among the Sikh Diaspora".

=== Late 20th Century ===
In 1983, President of India, Giani Zail Singh visited Argentina and gave a talk at the Argentina Congress. He met with 100 families from Punjab who emigrated to Argentina in 1930.

=== 21st Century ===
In 2018, the Sikh faith was officially recognised in Argentina.

Many Sikhs currently own ranches, transport companies, supermarkets and retail shops in Argentina.

Simmarpal Singh is a successful Sikh Argentine businessman who is known as the 'Peanut Prince of Argentina'. In 2012, his company Olam International, had an annual revenue of Singapore $17 billion.

== Demographics ==
Most Sikhs in Argentina are Punjabi immigrants who came in 1930's or belong to the 3HO community. There has been some recent immigration from Sikhs in Punjab, India. While the trend of marrying locally has been prevalent among the first and subsequent generations of Sikh immigrants, the newer immigrants display more mixed feelings on the matter. Nevertheless, a strong emotional connection to their cultural heritage persists among all of them.

There was a large group of Sikh farmers and traders in the Argentinian town of Salta.

== Gurdwara ==
The Sikh community in Argentina has only one Gurdwara which is based in Rosario de la Frontera.

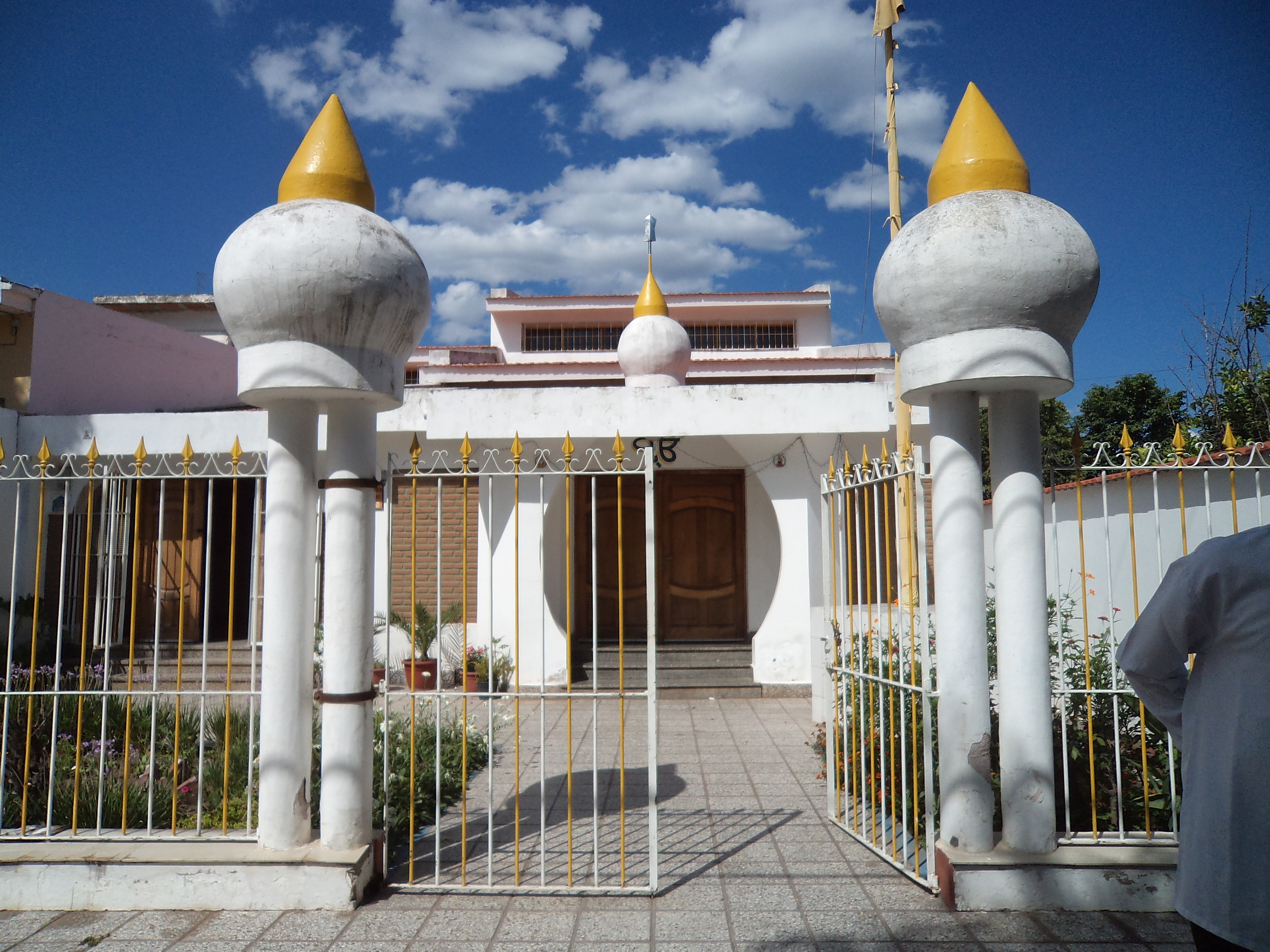
Gurdwara Rosario de la Frontera

== See also ==
- Sikhism in South America
- Sikhism in Brazil
- Sikhism by country
- Indians in Argentina
- Indian immigration to Brazil
- Sikhism in Chile
