= Sikhism in Mexico =

Sikh people in Maxico

Sikhism in Mexico Sijismo en México

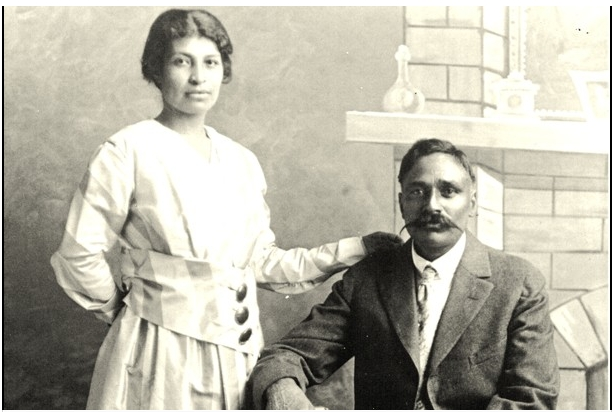
- A Punjabi-Mexican American couple, Valentina Alvarez and Rullia Singh, posing for their wedding photo in 1917.

Total population
- 1,000

Regions with significant populations
- Mexico City · Naucalpan

Religions
- Sikhism

Languages
- Mexican Spanish • Punjabi • Hindi • Urdu

Sikhs in Mexico are a religious minority in Mexico. There is estimated to be no more than 1,000 Sikhs living in Mexico, with most residing in Mexico City and the Naucalpan region.

== History ==
=== 1900s–1950 ===
Sikh migration to Mexico started in the early 1900s from Punjab Province (British India). Sikhs were migrating in large numbers for economic opportunities in United States and Canada. However, due to the U.S. Immigration Act of 1917, some Sikhs ended up staying in Mexico.

As many Sikhs had difficulty with entry in the United States in the following decades, some Sikh farmers settled in Mexico and married Mexican women.

=== 1950–2000 ===
In the 1980s Yogi Bhajan visited Mexico City, introducing Kundalini yoga, which led to a large number of his students converting to Sikhism from Catholicism.

=== 2000s–Present ===
In 2016, Sikh-American actor Waris Ahluwalia was initially barred from his Aeroméxico flight from Mexico City to New York because of his turban.

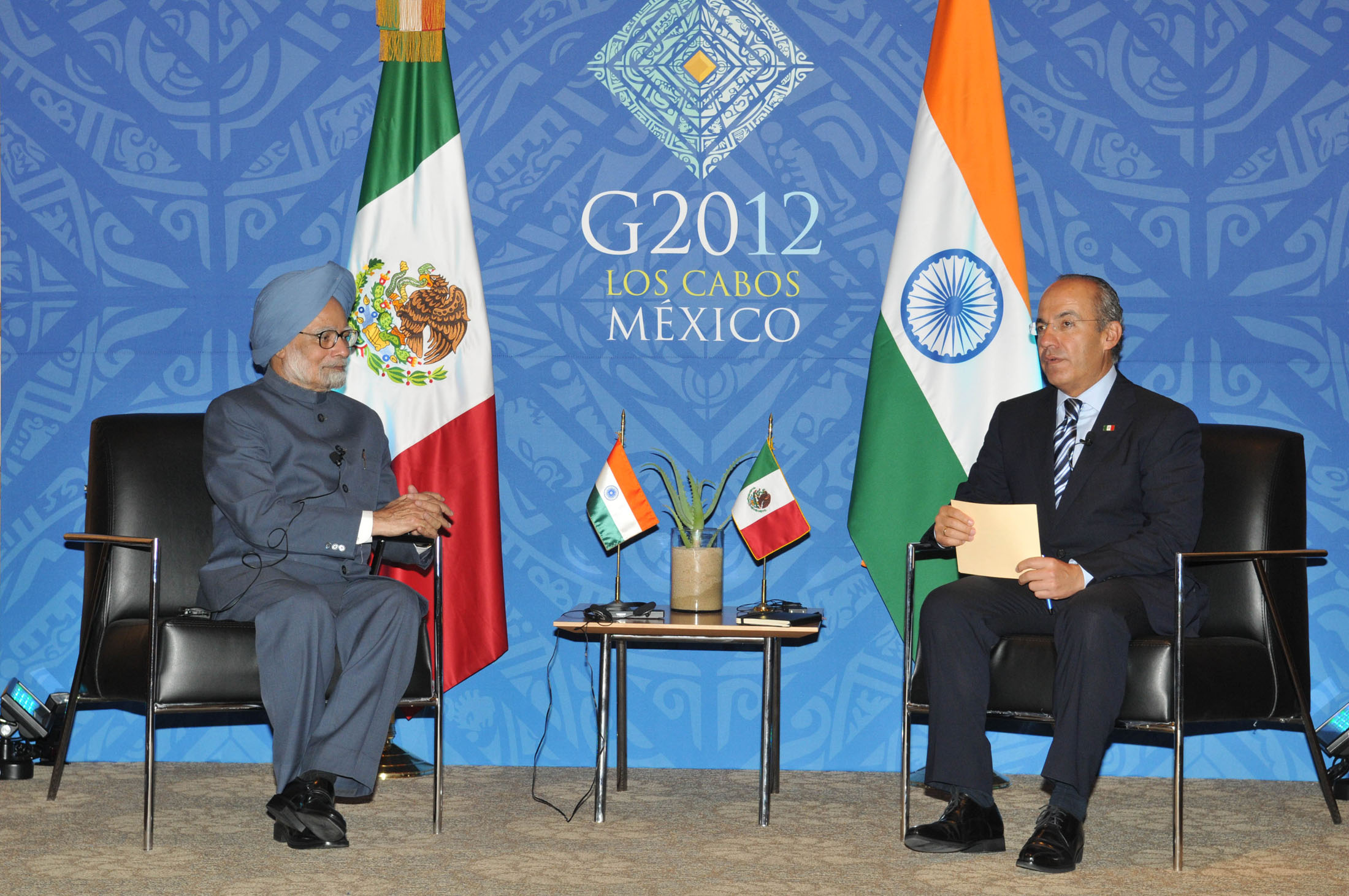
The First Sikh Prime Minister of India, Dr Manmohan Singh, meeting with President Felipe Calderón of Mexico in Los Cabos, Baja California Sur (June 18, 2012)

In 2022, the federal government of Mexico agreed to offer asylum to 141 Afghan Sikh refugees based humanitarian grounds.

== Gurdwara ==
There is currently one fully functioning Gurdwara, which is located in Tecamachalco, State of Mexico, close to the border with Mexico City.

== Mexican Sikh organisations ==
- Sikh Dharma Mexico

== Notable Sikhs from Mexico ==
- Babaji Singh – Mexican Sikh credited with translating the Guru Granth Sahib into Spanish.

== See also ==
- Punjabi Mexican Americans
- Sikhism in Chile
- Sikhism in Argentina
- Sikhism in the United States
- Religion in Mexico
- Indian Mexicans
