= Sufi Amba Prasad =

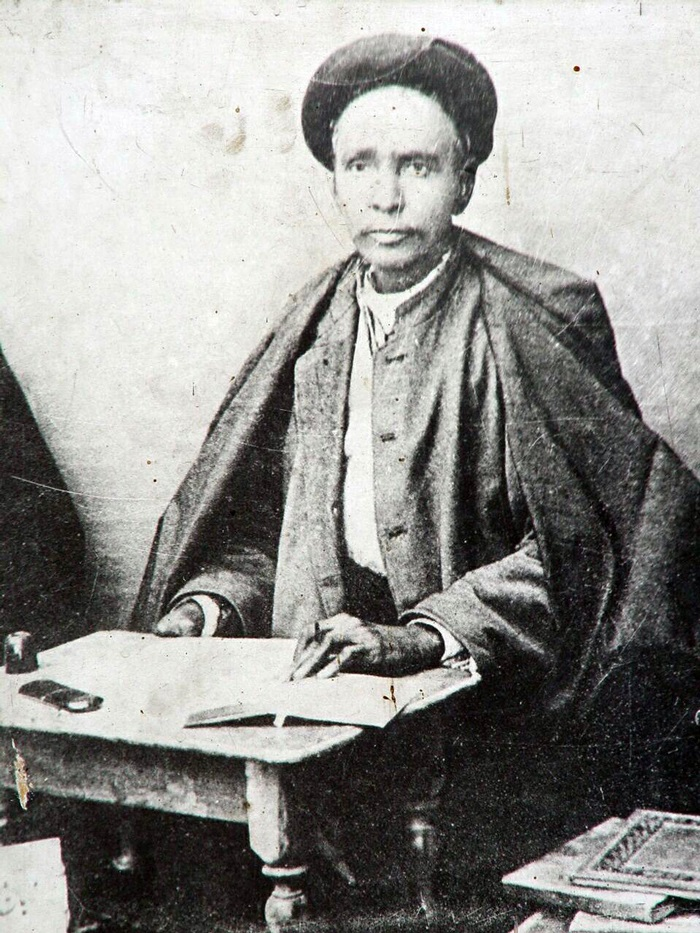
- Sufi Amba Parshad in Iran 1909
- Born: Amba Prasad; 1858; Moradabad, North-Western Provinces, British India
- Died: 21 January 1917 (aged 58–59); Shiraz, Persia
- Resting place: Shiraz, Iran
- Known for: 1907 Punjab unrest, Hindu–German Conspiracy

Amba Prasad (1858 — 21 January 1917) also known as Sufi Amba Prasad, was an Indian nationalist and pan-Islamist leader notable for his involvement in the agrarian unrest in Punjab in 1907 and subsequently in the Revolutionary movement for Indian independence. Prasad was born in 1858 in the north Indian city of Moradabad, then in the United Provinces. Prasad was born without his right hand. He later worked as a journalist in Moradabad when he became involved in the emerging nationalist movement. He was at this time the editor of the Peshwa. His editorials were noted for sarcastic and unsparing criticisms of the Punjab government policies. He was incarcerated twice in 1897.

In 1900, Prasad became involved in the agrarian movement that was emerging in Punjab. His associates at the time included Sardar Ajit Singh (uncle of Bhagat Singh), Mahasha Ghaseeta Ram, Kartar Singh and Lala Lajpat Rai. In 1906, Prasad was one of the key founding members of the Bharat Mata Society. A crackdown later forced him to flee India for Nepal in 1907, where he was granted asylum by Deva Shamsher Jang Bahadur Rana. Prasad later fled India for Persia.

Around 1910, Indian nationalists groups, especially pan-Islamic ones, were growing in the Ottoman Empire and Persia under the leadership of Sardar Ajit Singh and Sufi Amba Prasad who began their work there around 1909. The recruits to these groups included young radicals of the likes of Rhishikesh Letha, Zia-ul-Haq, and Thakur Das. By 1910, the activities of these groups and their publication, the Hayat, had come under the observation of British intelligence. However, Ajit Singh's departure in 1911 brought the Indian revolutionary activities to a grinding halt, while British representations to Persia successfully curbed whatever activity that remained in the country.

However, as World War I began, Prasad again became involved in the Hindu–German Conspiracy. He was at this time associated with Indian revolutionaries of the likes of Har Dayal and Mahendra Pratap. Sufi worked with the revolutionaries of the Berlin Committee in Mesopotamia and Middle East, attempting to spread propaganda among Indian troops of the Indian expeditionary force. His attempts were directed at organising Indian troops into a nationalist force incursions from the western border of India from Persia, through Baluchistan, to Punjab. Amba Prasad was joined during the war by Kedar Nath Sondhi, Rishikesh Letha and Amin Chaudhry. These Indian troops were involved in the capture of the frontier city of Karman and the detention of the British consul there, and also successfully harassed Percy Sykes' Persian campaign against the Baluchi and Persian tribal chiefs who were aided by the Germans. The Aga Khan's brother was killed while fighting the rebels.

The rebels also successfully harassed British forces in Sistan in Afghanistan, confining them to Karamshir in Baluchistan, and later moving towards Karachi. Some reports indicate they took control of the coastal towns of Gawador and Dawar. The Baluchi chief of Bampur, having declared his independence from British rule, also joined the Ghadarites. It was not before the war in Europe turned for the worse for the Ottoman Empire and Baghdad was captured by the British forces that the Ghadarite forces, their supply lines starved, were finally dislodged. They retreated to regroup at Shiraz, where they were finally defeated after a bitter fight during the siege of Shiraz. Amba Prasad Sufi was killed in this battle, but the Ghadarites carried on guerrilla warfare along with Iranian partisans until 1919. The works of Amba Prasad had a significant impact on Bhagat Singh.

== Bibliography ==
- Ahluwalia, M. M. (1965), Freedom Struggle in India, 1858 to 1909, Rajit Printers & Publishers
- Gupta, Manmathnath. (1972), History of the Indian revolutionary movement, Somaiya Publications
- Herbert, Edwin (2003), Small Wars and Skirmishes 1902–1918: Early Twentieth-century Colonial Campaigns in Africa, Asia and the Americas, Nottingham: Foundry Books Publications, ISBN 1-901543-05-6
- Punjab Government, Public Relations Dept (1962), Advance, Punjab
- Radhan, O. P. (2002), Encyclopaedia of Political Parties, Anmol Publications Pvt ltd, ISBN 81-7488-865-9
- Rai, S. M. (1978), Punjabi Heroic Tradition, 1900-1947, Punjabi University
- Sykes, Sir Percy (1921). A History of Persia (2nd ed.). MacMillan.
- Yadav, B. D. (1992), M. P. T. Acharya, Reminiscences of an Indian Revolutionary, Anmol Publications Pvt ltd, ISBN 81-7041-470-9
- Yadav, K.C.; Singh, Babar (2006), Bhagat Singh: Making of a Revolutionary : Contemporaries' Portrayals, Hope India, ISBN 81-7871-059-5
