= Pescarolo =

Pescarolo may refer to:

- Henri Pescarolo, a French Formula One, sports car, and rally driver
  - Pescarolo Sport, the French motorsports team founded by Henri Pescarolo
- Juliano Pescarolo Martins (born 1974), Brazilian footballer
- Pescarolo ed Uniti, an Italian comune in the Province of Cremona
