= Brazilians in India =

Ethnic group in India

- (Brazil) (India)

Total population
- 860 (Brazilian nationals) Unknown number of descendants

Regions with significant populations
- Goa; Hyderabad; Bangalore; Daman and Diu; Mangalore; Chennai; Bombay (Mumbai); Kolkata; New Delhi; Poona

Languages
- English; Brazilian Portuguese; Indo-Portuguese; Indian languages

Religion
- Roman Catholicism, Protestantism and minority of Hinduism

Related ethnic groups
- Brazilian diaspora, Luso-Indians, Goans, Bombay East Indians

Brazilians in India form a very small community consisting of immigrants and expatriates (mostly footballers and fashion models) from Brazil. According to the Brazilian consulate as of 2020 there are some 860 Brazilians living in India.

== Overview ==
=== Immigrants ===
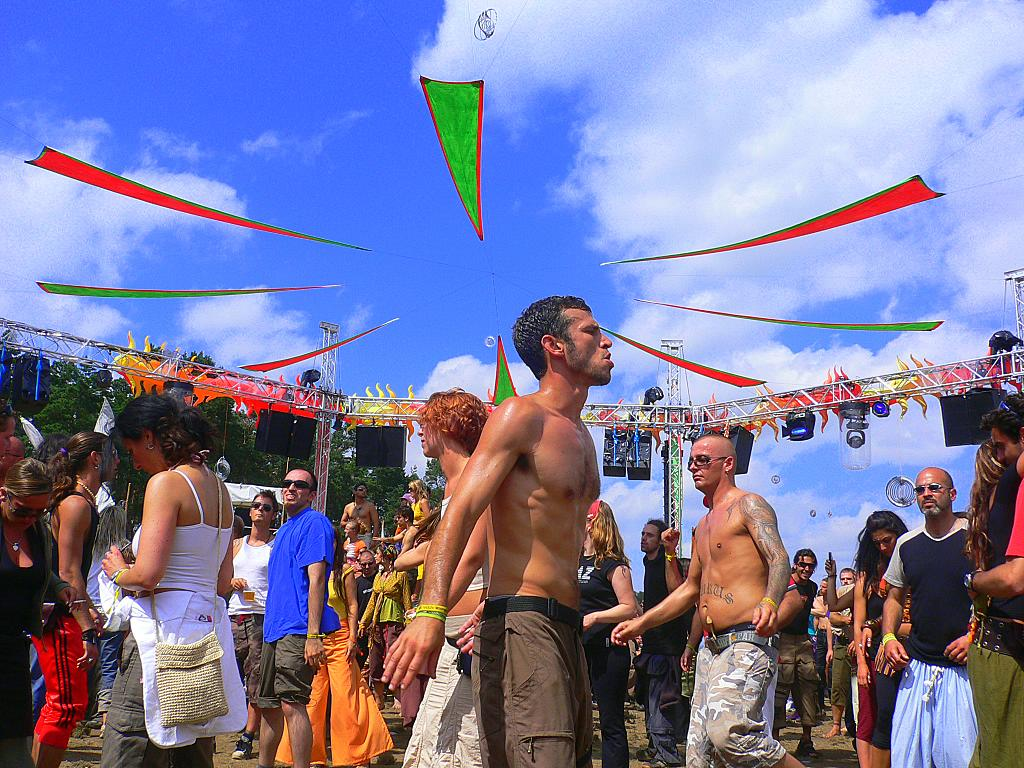
Brazilian and Portuguese revelers celebrating Carnival in Goa.

There are small Brazilian communities in Chennai, Goa and Mumbai. Currently, there are about 40 Brazilian families in Goa itself and there is a Brazilian consulate located in Bombay. Many Brazilians settled in Goa because its culturally similar to Brazil as they were both former Portuguese colonies.

Brazilian culture is also visible in Goa. Samba music and dance became part of the local festivities of Goa Carnival in 2008 and Goa has been promoting Brazilian studies. Goa University had a Brazilian chair for Latin American studies for many years and they offer a variety of courses such as Brazilian literature, philosophy and sociology.

=== Expatriates ===
India is emerging as a leading market for second-string footballers from Latin America, particularly Brazil. Brazilian footballers are playing club football in India because they get paid more in India that they can ever hope to earn in Brazil. Coaches from Brazil also came to train Indian footballers. The Brazilian community in Chennai are mainly involved in business, IT and Automobile Manufacture.

The Indian Fashion Industry also recruits models from Brazil as their approach to fashion is more professional and their exposure has been extensive. They are also recruited because they are much less inhibited, so assignments which require them to don a bikini or a swimsuit are easier than for Indian girls. However they earn less than Indian models but the rates are at par with other parts of the world. The only difference is that they probably have to do three shows instead of one in India.

== Notable people ==
- José Ramirez Barreto - Footballer
- Edmar Figueira - Footballer
- Cristiano Júnior - Footballer
- Eduardo Chacon Coelho Lacerda - Footballer
- Josimar da Silva Martins - Footballer
- Juliano Pescarolo Martins - Footballer
- Carlos Roberto Pereira - Football Coach
- Luciano Sabrosa - Footballer
- Roberto Mendes Silva - Footballer
- Nathalia Kaur - Model and actress
- Bruna Abdullah - Model and actress
- Giselli Monteiro - Actress and model
- Izabelle Leite - Model and Actress
- Jeniffer Piccinato - Actress and Model
- Gabriela Bertante - Model
- Gloria Arieira - scholar

== See also ==
- Brazil–India relations
- Indians in Brazil
- Caminho das Índias
- Luso-Indian
