= Sikhism in Chile =

Sikhism in Chile Sijs en Chile

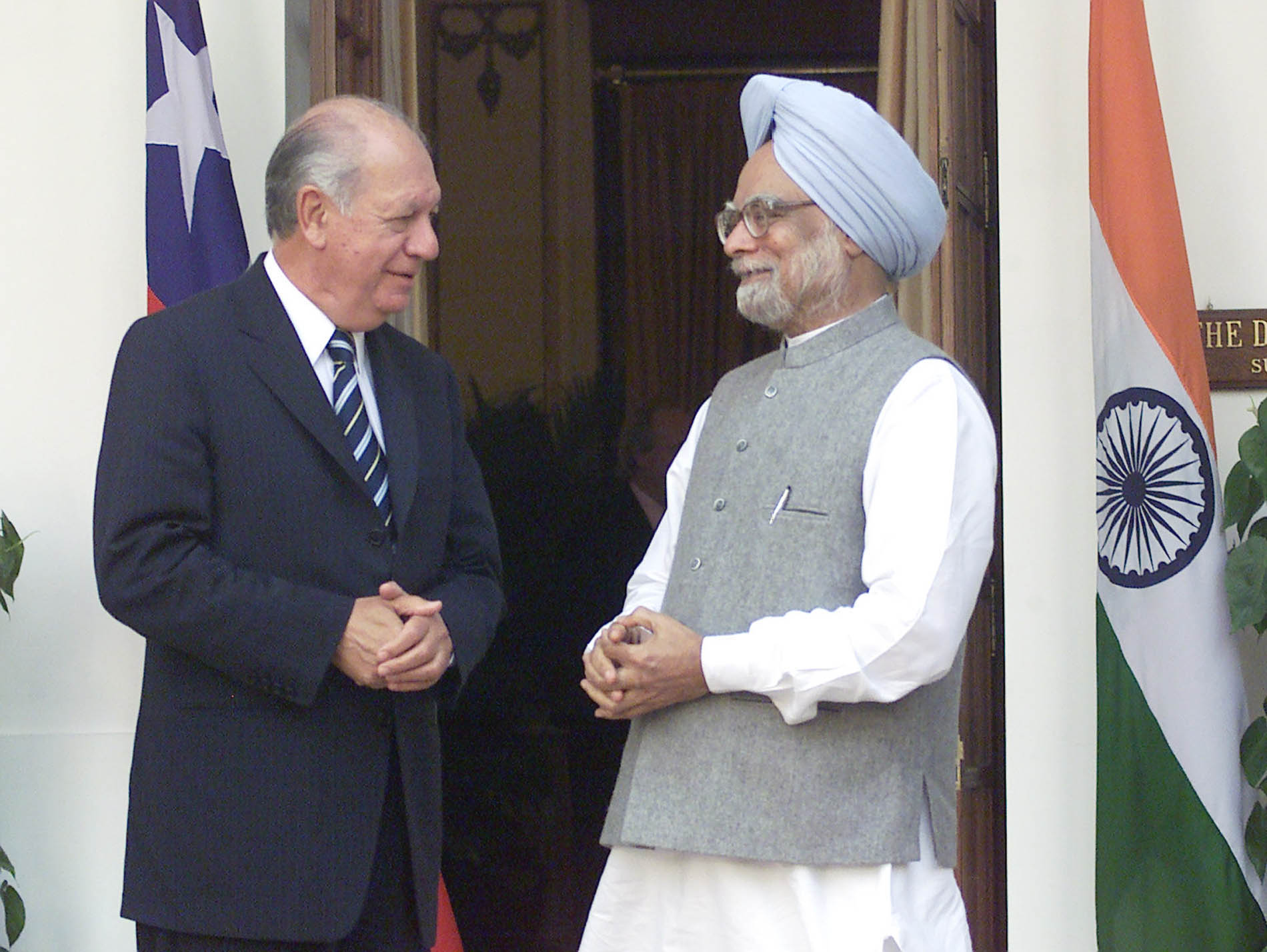
- Former Prime Minister of India, Dr. Manmohan Singh with Former President of Chile, Mr. Ricardo Lagos Escobar (20 January 2005)

Total population
- Unknown (Fewer than 1,000)

Regions with significant populations
- Santiago · Iquique

Religions
- Sikhism

Languages
- Chilean Spanish • Andean Spanish • Punjabi • Hindi • Urdu

Website
- https://sikh.cl/ (Sikh Dharma Chile)

Sikhs in Chile are a religious minority in Chile. There is no demographic data on the Sikh population living in the country but it is estimated to be less than 1,000.

== History ==
The arrival of Sikhs in Chile largely started in the early 1900s to work on the railway lines to connect to Bolivia. Due to the Anti-Asian immigration policy within North America in the early 20th century, most Sikhs arrived in Chile before moving onto Argentina.

Yogi Bhajan introduced Sikhism at a larger scale to Chile in the late 20th century. This was particularly done through Kundalini yoga, which was popular in the 1960s.

In 2010, a Chilean documentary was released called "Sikh en Santiago". This was based upon the troubles facing a turbaned Sikh man in Santiago due to his appearance and Sikh faith.

== Religious recognition ==
In 2016, Sikhism (recognised as Sikh Dharma) was officially legally recognised as a religion in Chile, making it the first to do so in South America. Following recognition, Sikhs will also be allowed to wear the Kirpan, pursue other religious projects and receive donations.

== Gurdwara ==
There are currently two Gurdwaras in Chile in Iquique and Viña del Mar.

The Gurdwara in Iquique shares the space with a Hindu temple.

Gurdwara Guru Ram Das Ashram in Viña del Mar to Agia Akal Singh and Charansev Kaur Khalsa. The Nishaan Sahib was first raised in Chile on October 9, 2019, in commemoration of Guru Ram Das’ birthday

== Chilean Sikh Organisations ==
- Sikh Dharma Chile
- Langar Chile

== See also ==
- Sikhism in South America
- Sikhism in Argentina
- Sikhism in Brazil
- Sikhism by country
- Indians in Chile
- Sikh diaspora
