= Khatkar Kalan =

Village in Punjab, India

- town
- Location in Punjab, India Khatkar Kalan (India)
- Coordinates: 31.1167°N 76.1333°E
- Country: India
- State: Punjab
- District: Shaheed Bhagat Singh Nagar

Languages
  - Official: Punjabi
- Time zone: UTC+5:30 (IST)
- PIN: 144512
- Vehicle registration: PB-32

Khatkar Kalan is a village just outside Banga town in Shaheed Bhagat Singh Nagar district (recently named Nawanshahr earlier the part of Jalandhar district) in the Indian state of Punjab. This place is famous for the memorial of Bhagat Singh, an Indian freedom fighter, who was born in Banga, and after whom the district is also named. Khurd and Kalan mean small and large respectively, when two villages have the same name they are at times distinguished by using Kalan or Khurd with the village name, to indicate their size relative to each other.

Neighboring villages that share a boundary with Katkar Kalan are Thandian, Dosanjh Khurd, Manguwal, Karnana, Naura, Kahma, Bhootan, Bhukhari and the Town of Banga.

== Attractions ==
The Shaheed-e-Azam Bhagat Singh Museum opened in the village on the 50th anniversary of his death. Exhibits include Singh's half-burnt ashes, the blood-soaked sand, and the blood-stained newspaper in which the ashes were wrapped. A page of the first Lahore Conspiracy Case's judgement in which Kartar Singh Sarabha was sentenced to death and on which Singh put some notes is also displayed, as well as a copy of the Bhagavad Gita with Bhagat Singh's signature, which was given to him in the Lahore Jail, and other personal belongings.

The Bhagat Singh Memorial was built in 2009 in the village at a cost of ₹168 million (US$1.8 million).

== Notable persons ==
- Sardar Ajit Singh Sandhu, Indian revolutionary and nationalist
