= Pagri Sambhal Jatta =

Indian chant

Pagri Sambhal Jatta, meaning "take care of your turban farmer", was a chant coined in 1907 in Punjab by the Indian poet Banke Dayal. It gained prominence during the Pagri Sambhal Jatta movement, led by Ajit Singh, Kishan Singh, and Ghastia Ram, against a series of colonial agricultural laws, including the Punjab Land Alienation Act, 1900, the Punjab Land Colonisation Act, 1906, and the Doab Bari Act, 1907. It was repopularised in 2020 with the farmers protests in India.
