= Punjab Canal Colonies =

Parts of western Punjab

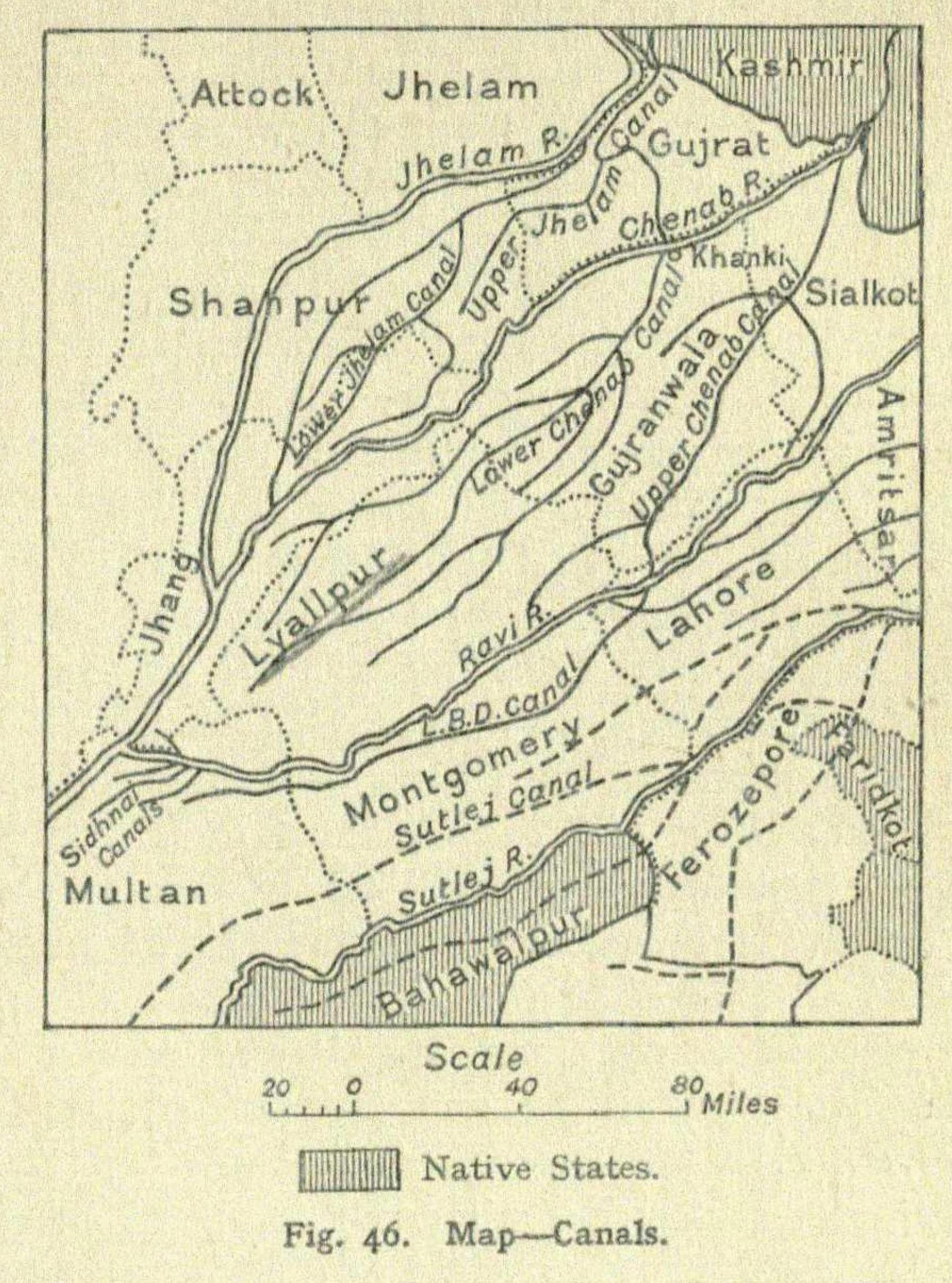
Map of canals in the western part of Punjab Province, British India, published in 'The Panjab, North-West Frontier Province and Kashmir' (1916)

The Punjab Canal Colonies is the name given to parts of western Punjab which were brought under cultivation through the construction of canals and agricultural colonisation during the British Raj.

The Punjab underwent an agricultural revolution, with arid subsistence production getting replaced by commerce-oriented production of huge amounts of wheat, cotton and sugar. Between 1885 and 1940, nine canal colonies were created in the inter-fluvial tracts west of the Beas and Sutlej and east of the Jhelum rivers. In total, over one million Punjabis settled in the new colonies, relieving demographic pressures in central Punjab.

Many of these colonies were called Chak and given a number. Earlier their equivalent subdivisions used to be the Subah or Taraf, Pargana or Mahal, Mauza or Pir, which were replaced by the administrative divisions of India after the partition of India in 1947, though the Chak as name of villages still continues in the former Punjab Canal Colonies.

== Background ==
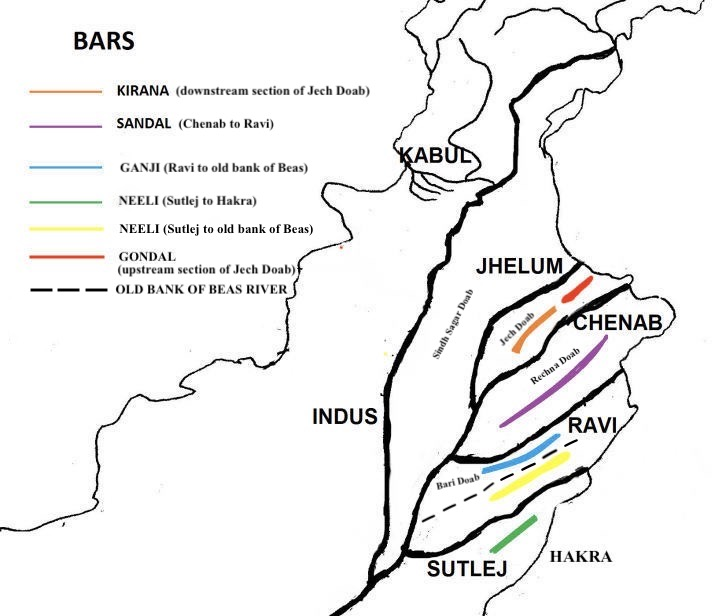
Map of the Bar Region of Punjab, showing the Kirana, Gondal, Sandal, Ganji, and Neeli bars, the names of major rivers and the Doabs are also shown.

There is scant evidence of canal-building in ancient Punjab, although small canal irrigation works were developed in the western region on the fringes of the Indus basin and highlands of Afghanistan on stable streams. The Swat Valley has evidence of early canal works.

The early history of canal construction in the Punjab plains is more uncertain, as it was difficult due to challenges found in the Indus basin, such as shifting river channels, high seasonal variability in flow, and high silt-load of the rivers of the area. Thus, any attempts at canal construction required a state to supervise it, due to the challenges presented that need to be overcome by a continuing investment of labour and resources. Canal construction in the Punjab region can be traced back to the Delhi Sultanate and Mughal Empire, spurred on by the introduction of the Persian wheel and government intervention.

During the Delhi Sultanate, there is some evidence of canal construction in Multan and Sindh. In the 14th century, Firoz Shah Tuqhlaq constructed canals that brought water from the Sutlej and Yamuna rivers to Delhi and Hissar. The later Mughal rulers would reconstruct and expand these canals, such as under Shah Jahan, who built the Hasli Canal which provided water from the Ravi river to the Shalimar Gardens, Lahore and other endeavors in Lahore. During the reigns of Akbar and Shah Jahan, older canals in Haryana were revived. These earlier attempts at canal building often utilized old river beds and channels. The construction of canals for irrigation purposes for agriculture was carried-out by local zamindars and other officials via persuasion from the state, such as via a sanad promising revenue concessions, with one example of this being the Shah Nahr Canal in Hoshiarpur district built in the early 18th century. The Mirranis of Dera Ghazi Khan carried out canal construction in the southwest of the Indus basin during the Mughal period.

During this period, there were certain positions relating to the canals, such as the mir-i ab, who were appointed canal superintendants, with one of their responsibilities being mobilizing the zamindars for the project. The mir-i ab carried out the canal project and were assisted by architects or masons known as maimar. There were also the cherr system, which utilized a levy of unpaid labourers who cleared the canals during winter, such as the mirabs (watermasters), darogas (work superintendents), and muharrirs (accountants). For some projects, labourers were paid from a fund known as zar-i nagha built-up from commutation fees from those who decided to pay a fee rather than provide work themselves. The panchayats or moonsiffs (assessors) helped with the distribution of labour-demand along the canal. Channels were known as nalla and flood-torrents were known as band-i sail. Sections of canals were known as dhak. However, the Mughals did not pay too much bureaucratic attention to canal-construction when compared to later polities of the region.

After Nader Shah's invasion of India in 1739 and the subsequent decline of Mughal authority in the area, many newer states arose in the Indus basin in the power-vacuum that followed aside from the Durranis. These were namely the Kalhoras in Sindh, Daudpotras in Bahawalpur, Mirrani successors in Dera Ghazi Khan, and the Afghan Saddozai Nawabs of Multan, whom were all major sponsors of canal construction. The development of economic trade with Afghanistan and Iran, along with the growth of trading-business in Shikarpur, Multan, Bahawalpur, and other areas, led to the increased demand for agricultural produce and commercial crops, such as indigo. Indigo and other commercial crops in demand were grown during the kharif season and this led to increasing construction of canals to facilitate their increased cultivation, as they could not easily be grown with flood water or well water alone during the hot season, as animal-powered wells were not efficiently run during that time. The Durrani Empire asserted their authority in the region by bestowing a large land grant on the makhdum of Sitpur, who were part of a family of Bukhari Sayyids (descendants of Sayyid Jalal ud-Din Bukhari of Uchh) who controlled various Sufi shrines in southwestern Punjab and Bahawalpur.

In the 1740s, the makhdum (traditional custodian of a Sufi shrine) of Sitpur sponsored the construction of a canal west of the Indus, which incorporated the Jats of the area in its construction. In the 1760s, the Manka Canal on the west bank of the Indus was extended. Those who assisted with the construction of canals were promised share of its water or from preexisting wells along the proposed route. The Bahawalpur rulers developed canals as a means of political consolidation and state-building, as earlier canals were constructed by the rival Daudpotra chiefs but by the end of the 18th century, the Bahawalpur nawabs had consolidated their political power by re-settling the Daudpotra and other martial jagirdars (grantees) on new canal land along the Sutlej. One common system, especially along the Sutlej and Chenab, there was a system of chakdari tenures, that bestowed upon investors, usually Hindus, productive control over land in return for giving the capital required to open cultivation, such as Persian wheels, with there being a small, annual proprietary fee. The chakdari system spread in the late 18th and early 19th centuries.

The Udasis of Brahm Buta Akhara also were responsible for digging a hansli (water channel) to feed water into the Amrit Sarovar of the Darbar Sahib complex in 1783. Later, the hansli was made redundant through the construction of a Amritsar-Lahore branch and Kasur-Sabraon branch. Since 1866, the Amrit Sarovar of the Golden Temple complex has been fed water from the Jethuwal distributory of the Upper Bari Doab of the region between the Beas and Ravi, via a connection between the Kaulsar Sarovar and Amrit Sarovar. The canal was originally kachcha but later was lined and covered. During the Sikh period in the early 19th century, the Sikh governor of Multan, Diwan Sawan Mal, successfully cultivated indigo through an early, plentiful, and constant source of water realized by irrigation canal construction, which was tied to commercial cash cropping. Diwan Sawan Mal promoted the chakdari system and invited Hindu settlement in the region, with canal-building arrangements being centered around wells. On the west bank of the Indus, the Baloch tribes played a critical role for canal construction. The traditional custodians of Sufi shrines also played an important role.

The Punjab in 1880

In 1849, the East India Company defeated the Sikh Empire and annexed the Punjab. The new regime, rather than replacing remnants of the previous ruling elites, used them as intermediaries between the government and the wider population. From the outset of annexation, the new provincial government believed that if a paternal district officer ruled with an iron hand, protecting his flock from outside threats - whether a moneylender or political agitator - the landowning cultivators would loyally support the British government. In the following years, British officials began surveying the land and undertook revenue settlements in each district. In order to finance new administration of the province, the local government needed to increase revenues. The primary method of doing so was to encourage the commercialisation of agriculture. In addition they encouraged individualisation in property rights, which was a marked shift from the collective ownership by village communities and certain other complex forms of property that had existed in the pre-British period.

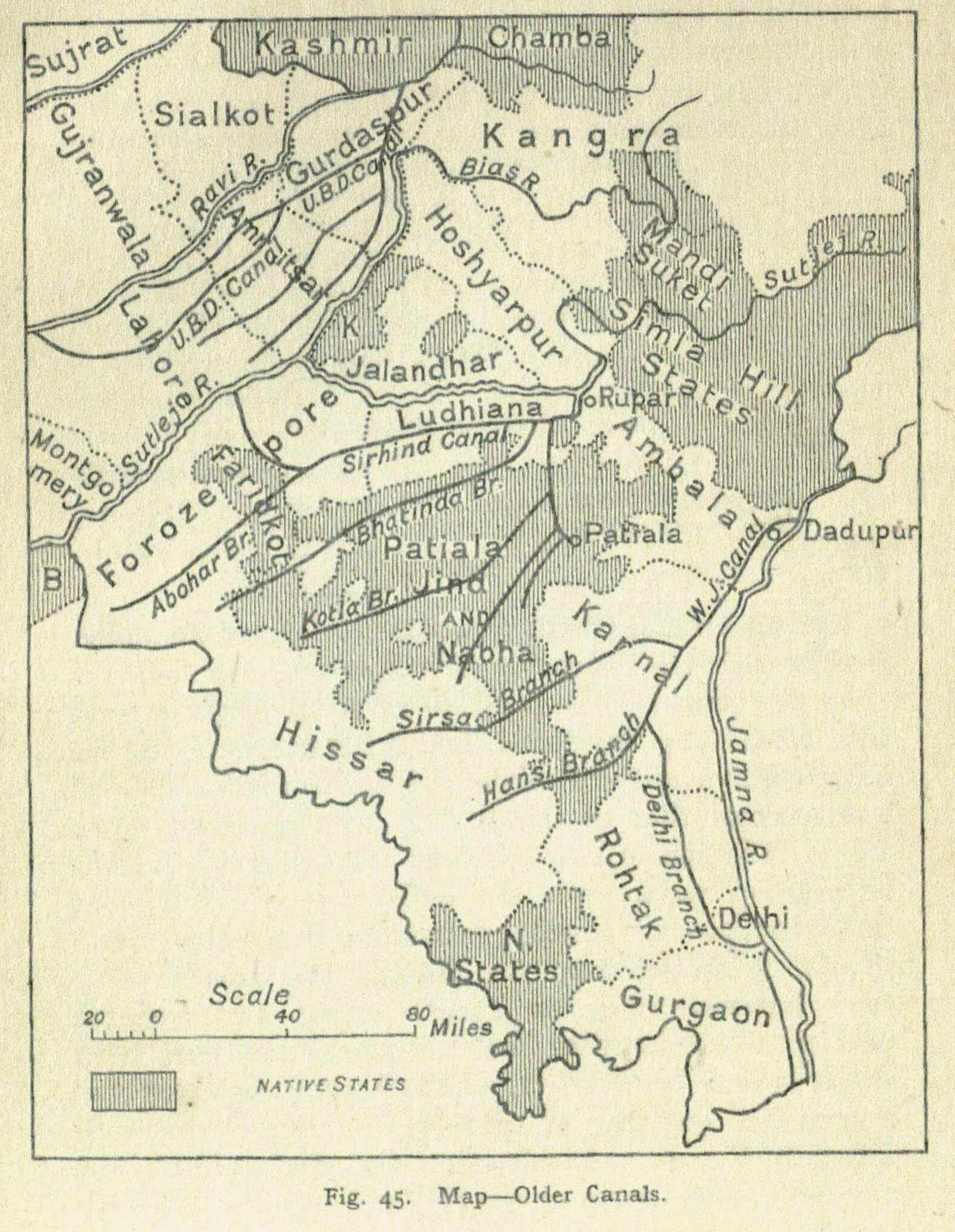
Map of older canals of Punjab Province, British India, published in 'The Panjab, North-West Frontier Province and Kashmir' (1916)

== Project ==
In the 19th century, the vast majority of the population was settled in the fertile regions of central and eastern Punjab. In the western Punjab rainfall was too low for large scale agriculture and resulted in large tracts of barren land. Most of this land had been assigned as Crown land and lay unused. In the 1880s the Punjab administration of Charles Umpherston Aitchison began the process of engineering a vast irrigation scheme in the mostly uninhabited wastelands. The two stated motives for the project were:

To relieve the pressure of population upon the land in those districts of the Province where the agricultural population has already reached or is fast approaching the limit which the land available to agriculture can support and to colonise the area in question with well-to-do yeomen of the best class of agriculturists, who will cultivate their own holdings with the aid of their families and the usual menials, but as much as possible without the aid of tenants, and will constitute healthy agricultural communities of the best Punjab type.

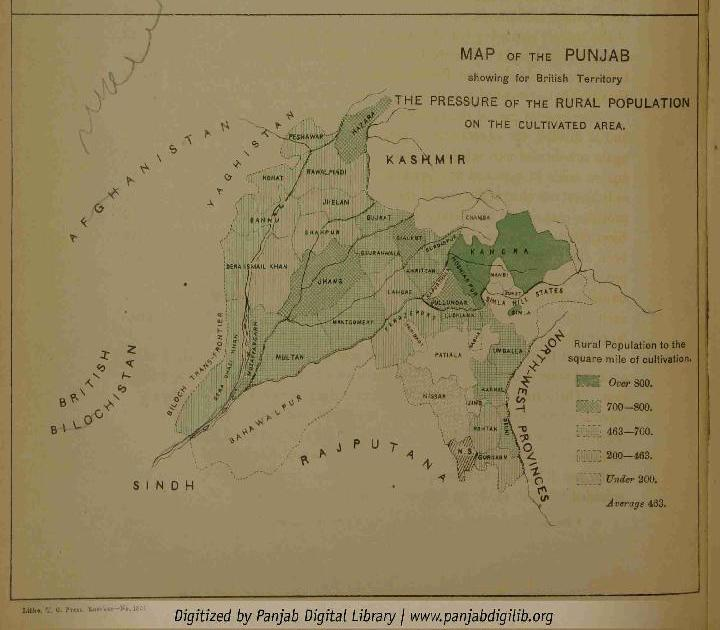
Map of British Punjab showing the pressure of the rural population on the cultivated area, published in the Census of India, 1891, Volume XIX, Part 1

The government hoped to "create villages of a type superior in comfort and civilisation to anything which had previously existed in the Punjab", which in turn would increase productivity. This increased productivity would then boost revenues for the government. To finance this ambitious project, capital was raised through the sale of governmental bonds in Britain, offering investors the chance to benefit from the interest charges remitted by the provincial government.

== Colonies ==
=== Sidhnai Colony ===
The Sidhnai Colony was located in the district of Multan. It was primarily settled between 1886 and 1888, when 176,702 acres were allocated to 2,705 settlers. The minimum size of grants was fixed at 50 acres, and grantees were required to build wells to harvest Rabi crops. Peasant grantees were preferred as the government felt self-cultivators would prevents the influx of sub-tenants and labourers from neighbouring regions. Furthermore, the government were attracted by the idea of creating a strong self-supporting peasantry, believing it necessary for agricultural progress and maintaining political stability.

Although an amount of land was reserved for Multani locals, preference was given for grantees from central Punjab, namely the districts of Lahore, Amritsar, Gurdaspur, Hoshiarpur, Jullunder and Ferozepur. This stemmed from a belief from British officials that central Punjabis were the most skilled and efficient agriculturists in the region. The first settlers were Sikh Jatts from Amritsar. Following the success of the initial grantees, and the proven profitability of the venture, colony land started to become highly sought after.

=== Sohag Para Colony ===
The Sohag Para Colony commenced at the same time as the Sidhnai Colony, however was smaller in scale. Situated in the Montgomery District, the colony was irrigated by an inundation canal which was seasonal in nature. As a result, it required larger landholdings to encourage grantees with sufficient capital to develop the irrigation infrastructure. Surveys conducted a decade after its establishment found that only 35 per cent of the land was cultivated by the actual grantees, whilst 65 per cent was rented to sub-tenants.

The government selected members of dominant landholding castes for land grants. 38 per cent of the area was allocated to Jatt Sikhs, with the average size of their holdings being sixty acres. A personal grant of 7,800 acres was allotted to Sir Khem Singh Bedi, a Khatri Sikh from Rawalpindi, making him the largest landholder by a considerable margin. The largest number of grants went to individuals from districts of Lahore, Amritsar and Montgomery.

=== Chunian Colony ===
Situated in the southern part of the Lahore district, colonisation began in 1896. This developed in a more piecemeal fashion, as parcels of land became irrigable and thus habitable at different times. For the first phase, the government decided to auction the land rather than issuing grants. This attracted offers from wealthy landowners and members of the Punjabi urban bourgeoisie, generating considerable profits for the government. Thereafter land was sold to landowners from neighbouring villages as compensation for their loss of long standing grazing rights lost to canal irrigation. The last stage was allocated to peasant grantees. Peasant grantees largely hailed from the Lahore district, from areas suffering overpopulation. The majority of grants were allotted to Arains, Jats, Kambohs, and Labana.

=== Chenab Colony ===
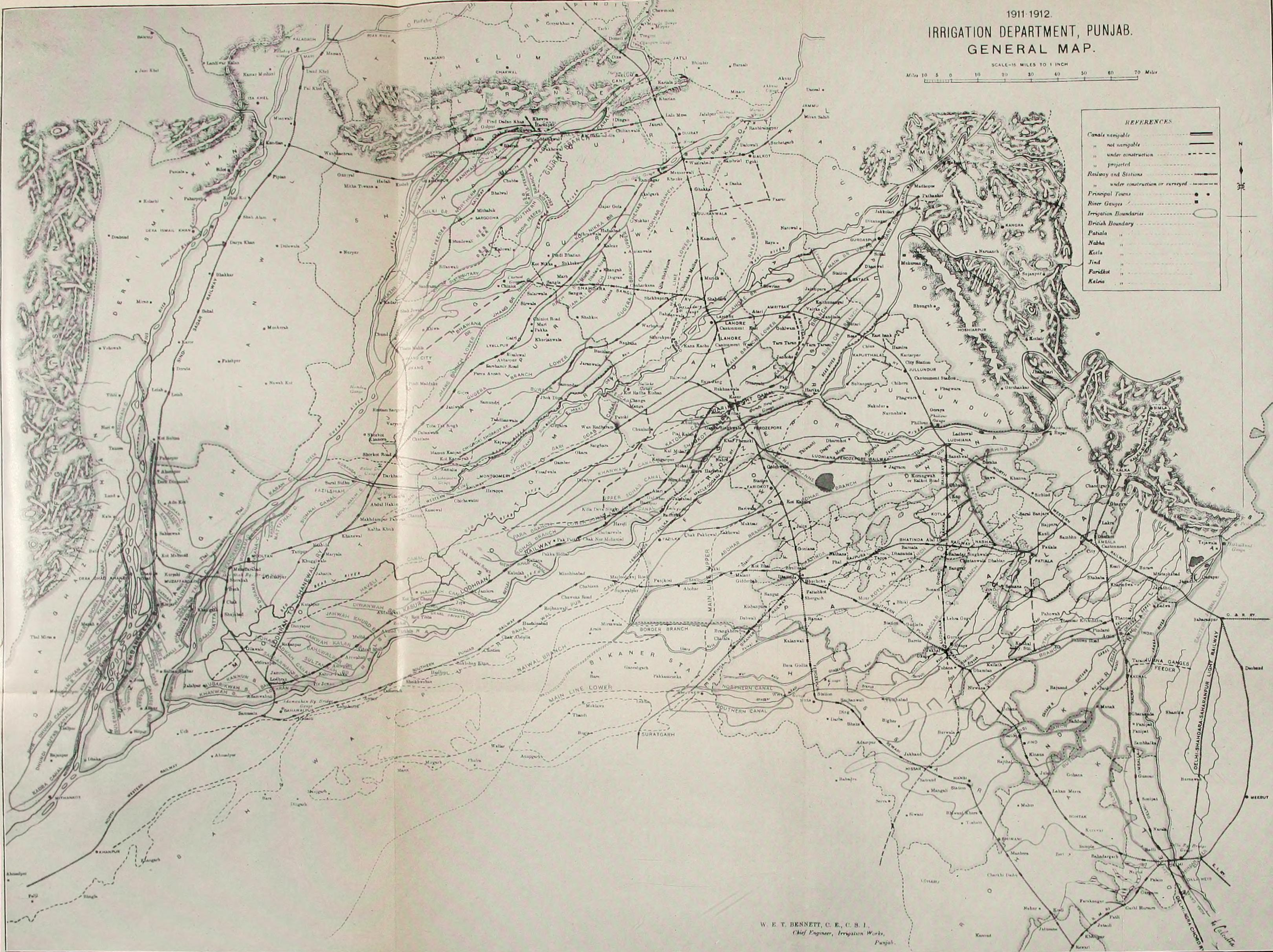
Map of the area irrigated by canal works in 1915

Chenab Colony Population history
Year	Pop.	±%
1855	805,152	—
1868	898,603	+11.6%
1881	1,012,188	+12.6%
1891	1,127,010	+11.3%
1901	1,927,353	+71.0%
1911	2,296,656	+19.2%
1921	2,696,738	+17.4%
1931	3,249,054	+20.5%
1941	3,982,678	+22.6%
Source: Census in British India; Including Gujranwala District, Jhang District, Lyallpur District, and Sheikhupura District.

The Chenab Colony was the largest colonisation project in the Punjab, beginning in 1892. It covered the entirety of the Lyallpur district, along with parts of the Jhang, Gujranwala and Lahore districts. The area was well suited for large-scale colonisation, being a level, alluvial plain, virtually unbroken by ridges or natural drainages. The area was mostly barren land, save for settlement in the riverain tracts, and the presence of semi-nomadic pastoral people known as Janglis, whose rights to graze the land had not been recognised as amounting to proprietary rights by the government. These groups would however form part of an indigenous grouping, classed together with individuals from Montgomery, Jhang and Gujranwala who would be allotted 35 per cent of the total land in the new colony.

There were three types of grants in the Chenab Colony, namely peasant, yeoman and capitalist grants. Peasants had to remain as tenants of the government and could not acquire proprietary rights. This was designed to curtail the powers of alienation of peasant grantees. Yeoman and capitalist grantees were allowed to acquire proprietary rights after a five-year qualification period. Upon acquiring the grants, the yeoman and capitalist grantees were required to pay a fee to the government in lieu of the size of their holdings. Peasant and yeoman grantees were required to be resident on the land. 78.3 per cent of the total land in the colony was allotted to peasant grantees. The Yeomen could belong only to the landholding agricultural classes, and they were to be drawn from small and middle level landlords. The capitalist grants were intended for men whom the government wished to reward for rendering political, administrative or military services. They were also intended for individuals with capital, who would invest in improved farming and thereby raise the standard of agriculture in the colony.

In identifying immigrant colonists, the government had two objectives; to provide relief from population congestion and to procure the most skilled agriculturalists. As such grantees were selected from seven districts, Ambala, Ludhiana, Jullundur, Hoshiarpur, Amritsar, Gurdaspur and Sialkot. Between 1891 and 1921, the population densities in all seven districts declined, thus avoiding the potential for rural instability. These immigrant colonists were granted over 60 per cent of the allotted land in the Colony. The strict allocation of land to immigrants from just these seven districts led to criticism of neglect in the west of Punjab, and thereafter 135,000 acres of land was granted to individuals from Gujrat, Jhelum, Shahpur, Rawalpindi, Multan, Lahore, Ferozepur and Bannu. It was decided that peasant grantees would be hereditary and landholding agriculturists, and would be drawn from the established Arain, Jat and Kamboh castes. The Arains formed the largest group of grantees, holding 36 per cent of the entire colony. Hindus and Muslims were each given around 31 per cent of the total allotted area. Amongst the yeoman and capitalist grants, substantial allotments went to Rajputs.

Religious groups in the Chenab Colony region (British Punjab province era)
Religious group	1855		1868		1881		1891		1901		1911		1921		1931		1941	
Religious group	Pop.	%	Pop.	%	Pop.	%	Pop.	%	Pop.	%	Pop.	%	Pop.	%	Pop.	%	Pop.	%
Islam	573,233 (Note: Includes all Abrahamic religions and others (Islam, Christianity, Zoroastrianism, Judaism, others).)	71.2%	628,369	69.93%	779,550	77.02%	819,927	72.75%	1,312,046	68.08%	1,569,186	68.32%	1,844,332	68.39%	2,241,188	68.98%	2,741,304	68.83%
Hinduism (Note: 1931-1941: Including Ad-Dharmis)	231,919 (Note: Includes all Dharmic religions (Hinduism, Sikhism, Jainism, Buddhism, others).)	28.8%	225,645 (Note: Including total Chamar & Chuhra populations, enumerated separately during the 1868 census.)	25.11%	192,214	18.99%	254,708	22.6%	459,703	23.85%	404,104	17.6%	454,174	16.84%	450,985	13.88%	531,245	13.34%
Sikhism	—N/a	—N/a	41,905	4.66%	39,636	3.92%	49,257	4.37%	143,182	7.43%	273,845	11.92%	303,964	11.27%	410,939	12.65%	534,820	13.43%
Jainism	—N/a	—N/a	808	0.09%	581	0.06%	727	0.06%	955	0.05%	1,079	0.05%	1,070	0.04%	1,266	0.04%	1,706	0.04%
Christianity	—N/a	—N/a	119	0.01%	205	0.02%	2,390	0.21%	11,458	0.59%	48,439	2.11%	93,192	3.46%	144,642	4.45%	173,594	4.36%
Zoroastrianism	—N/a	—N/a	—N/a	—N/a	2	0%	0	0%	1	0%	3	0%	6	0%	33	0%	7	0%
Buddhism	—N/a	—N/a	—N/a	—N/a	0	0%	0	0%	0	0%	0	0%	0	0%	1	0%	2	0%
Judaism	—N/a	—N/a	—N/a	—N/a	—N/a	—N/a	0	0%	8	0%	0	0%	0	0%	0	0%	0	0%
Others	—N/a	—N/a	1,757	0.2%	0	0%	1	0%	0	0%	0	0%	0	0%	0	0%	0	0%
Total population	805,152	100%	898,603	100%	1,012,188	100%	1,127,010	100%	1,927,353	100%	2,296,656	100%	2,696,738	100%	3,249,054	100%	3,982,678	100%
Note: Includes Gujranwala District, Jhang District, Lyallpur District, and Sheikhupura District.

=== Jhelum Colony ===
The Jhelum Colony was settled between 1902 and 1906. The colony was situated in the Shahpur district, and had its headquarters in the newly founded town of Sargodha. Initially the colony was intended to serve the same aims as the other colonies of fostering agrarian excellence and relieving population strains. However the Report of the Horse and Mule breeding Commission of 1900-01 recommended the colonists be allowed to breed such animals for the army. The government of India subsequently instructed the Punjab government to impose these conditions on the new colony. Instead of selecting skilled agriculturists, the government were to now seek out skilled horse-breeders. British officials in the Punjab were initially opposed to the scheme, arguing that it risked jeopardising the entire colony, and questioning the region's supposed popularity for and prowess in horse-breeding. Furthermore, promises had already been made of grants to agriculturists, which would now need to be retracted, and was noted by the Commissioner of Rawalpindi as constituting a breach of good faith.

Under the new scheme, the horse-breeding tenure was imposed on all peasant grants. The size of peasant landholdings was increased, which resulted in absentee landlords and a large sub-tenant workforce. Yeoman grantees, which had initially been ear-marked to be scrapped, were required to possess 5-15 mares each. The majority of peasant grantees hailed from the districts of Gujrat, Sialkot and Gujranwala. Yeoman grantees were selected from families of local landed magnates, further bringing the allegiance of the rural gentry towards British rule. These Yeoman grantees would however prove to be unsatisfactory colonists, absentee landlords, and were unable to transfer their equine skills to the colony.

=== Lower Bari Doab Colony ===
Situated in the Montgomery and Multan districts, the colony lay between the Ravi and Beas rivers. Colonisation began in 1914 and lasted a decade, being disrupted by the First World War. The two most important considerations for the colony were to further the horse breeding scheme and provide land for military personnel. Land was also reserved for indigenous groups, peasants from congested areas, landed gentry and for compensatory grants for loss of land. In addition, for the first time land was allocated to landless men of lower castes.

Horse-breeding grants were the most significant group in the colony. Keen to avoid the problems encountered in the Jhelum Colony a new scheme was introduced. A certain proportion of rectangles were reserved for horse-breeding in every peasant village, and grantees competed for the lease of these 'horse-breeding rectangles'. Furthermore, a time limitation of 5 years would be placed on leases, enabling the government to weed out unsatisfactory breeders. Horse-breeding would thus be regarded as a means of acquiring additional resources, which the lessee could enjoy over and above his personal grant. This policy of inducing competition for resources in the village was however criticised by Geoffrey Fitzhervey de Montmorency, Deputy Commissioner of Lyallpur, who felt it would create factionalism and conflict.

The outbreak of the War led to the government increasing the amount of land available to military veterans to 180,000 acres. Within the Punjab, military service therefore became a means of securing landed status, offering unrivalled opportunities for social and economic mobility. This led to the opening up of colony land to a wider range of Punjabi society rather than the chosen groups in previous colonies. Nonetheless, the landholding peasantry of the Punjab, acquired the largest share of the colony, some 68.66 per cent.

=== Upper Chenab and Upper Jhelum Colonies ===
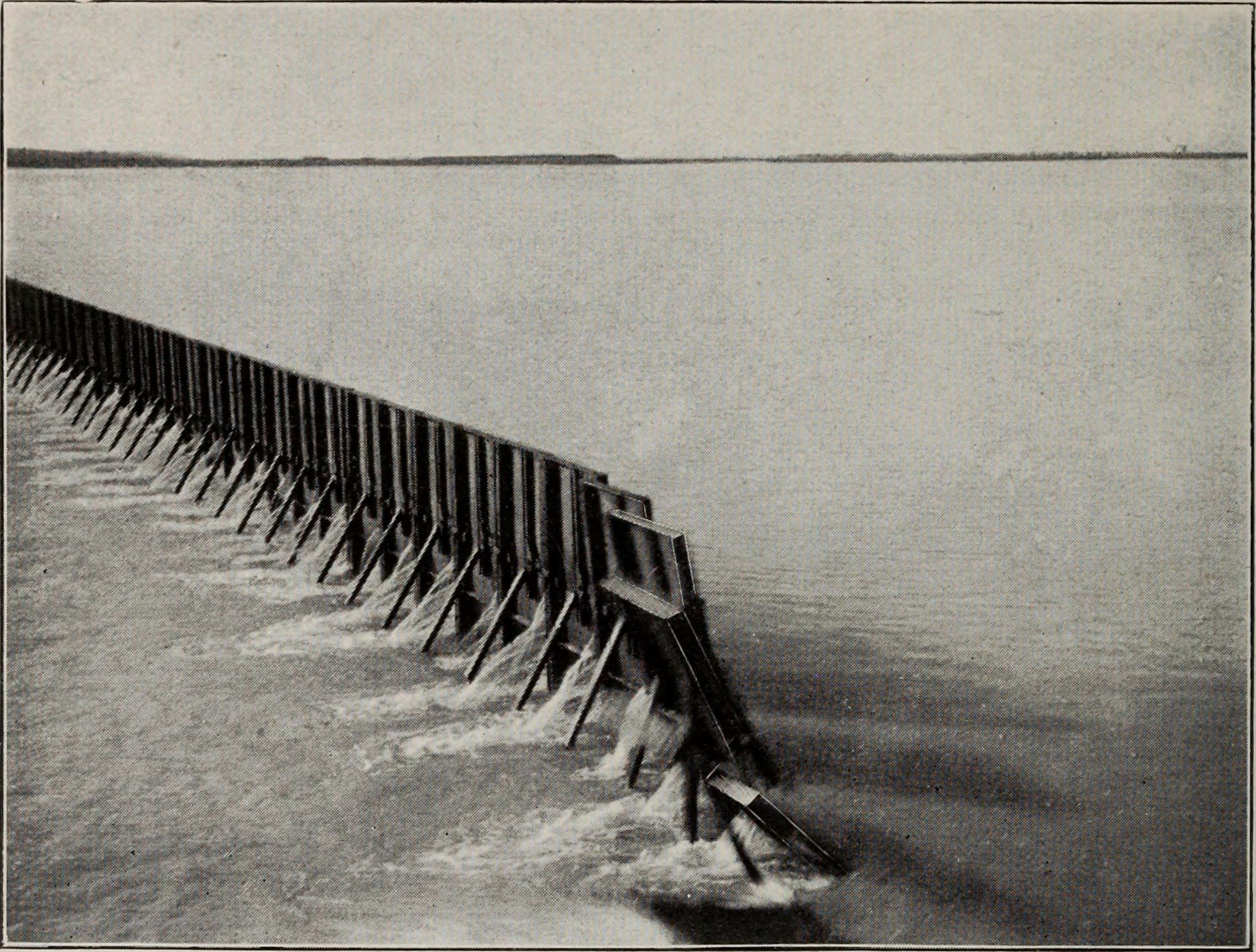
Marala Shutters at the head of the Upper Chenab Canal

These two colonies began at the same time as the Lower Bari Doab Colony. Smaller in scale, the two colonies amounted to just 120,000 acres. Lying to the north of the larger Chenab and Jhelum colonies, The primary purpose of the two canals on which these projects were based, the Upper Chenab and Upper Jhelum Canals, was to transport the waters of the Chenab and Jhelum Rivers to the Ravi, for the irrigation of the Lower Bari Doab Colony. Grants were given to those who had missed out on land in the Jhelum colony owing to the policy of horse-breeding. Special grants were also given to those who had distinguished themselves, or to the heirs of those who had lost their lives, in offering resistance to criminals, or by assisting in the prevention, investigation or prosecution of crime.

=== Nili Bar Colony ===
This Colony was last built under British rule. Colonisation began in 1926, however was never completed. It differed from the previous two large scale colonies in Jhelum and the Lower Bari Doab in that it did not reserve space for horse breeders. However military provision was provided for with the reservation of 75,000 acres for pensioned servicemen. Peasant grants reserved for agricultural castes formed the bulk of the land. The government decided that those eligible for peasant grants were those whose lands had been ruined by waterlogging, or by diluvion and river action, or those who that inhabited congested tracts. By 1929, over 70,000 acres had been allotted to sufferers from the districts of Sialkot, Gujranwala, Sheikhupura and Gujrat. The government specified that residents of tracts which had so far received little or no canal land should also be selected, provided that such men were skilled agriculturists and promised to make good colonists. Reward grants amounting to 36,750 were awarded to non officials deemed to have rendered loyal service to the government, whilst Police Grants were given to those "who have been conspicuous in aid to the Police, or who have assisted government in times of disorder or the like." Grants to 'Criminal tribes' were made in the hope of reclaiming through resettlement tribes which displayed habitual criminal tendencies.

45 per cent of the land was reserved for auction, with the hope of generating funds for the government. Part of the reason for the auctions was the need to recoup a profitable return on the capital outlay as a result of increased interest results following the war. The government put in place a plan to auction 15,000 acres a year for a period of 20–25 years. The auction process would however prove to be one of the greatest disasters of the entire colonisation project as the onset of the international economic crisis in 1929, meant the market for land in the Punjab collapsed entirely. The price of land fell so low that the government was only able to hold three auctions, selling just 3,773 acres in the next ten years. In the two decades from the inception of the auctions, the total area sold amounted to 118,728 acres, which was only one-third of the area reserved for this purpose.

Unable to sell the land, the government opted for temporarily leases. 319,200 acres had been leased by 1938, mainly to affluent individuals. The short terms of the leases encouraged malpractice, and exploitation by the tenants towards the sub-tenants who cultivated the land. This led to widespread unrest amongst the sub-tenants who were unable to pay their rent, and were falling into debt.

== Timeline of Colonies ==
Colony	Period of colonisation	Doab	District	Area in acres
Sidhnai	1886-88	Bari	Multan	250,000
Sohag Para	1886-88	Bari	Montgomery	86,300
Chenab	1892–1905; 1926-30	Rechna	Gujranwala, Jhang, Lyallpur, Lahore, Sheikhupura	1,824,745
Chunian	1896–98; 1904-05	Bari	Lahore	102,500
Jhelum	1902-06	Jech	Shapur, Jhang	540,000
Lower Bari Doab	1914-24	Bari	Montgomery, Multan	1,192,000
Upper Chenab	1915-19	Rechna	Gujranwala, Sialkot, Sheikhupura	78,800
Upper Jhelum	1916-21	Jech	Gujrat	42,300
Nili Bar	1916-40	Bari	Montgomery, Multan	1,650,000

== Agitation ==
To improve the economic position and standard of living amongst Punjabi agriculturalists, the provincial government had passed a series of paternalist measures. The Punjab Land Alienation Act, 1900 removed the zamindar's right to sell or mortgage his land without the approval of the district officer. These officers usually only approved a zamindar's request if he belonged to a tribe designated as an agricultural tribe by the government. The restrictions were designed to halt the flow of land outside the farming community and prevent further indebtedness towards moneylenders by curtailing cultivators' credit. Although the Act drew protests from the commercial tribes and money-lenders, they were unable to garner support from the cultivators whose interests had been protected. In the following years, encouraged by the lack of agitation, further paternalist measures were introduced, such as the Punjab Pre-Emption Act, which stated agriculturalists had first claim on any land sold by a villager.

From the turn of the century, conditions in the Chenab Colony had begun to cause an issue for the provincial government. As the government ran out of good land to distribute, settlers became increasingly agitated. Furthermore, the land was becoming increasingly fragmented as grantees distributed the land among many heirs. At the same time, officials were struggling to enforce discipline as many settlers evaded the residence requirements, built houses on farming plots, cut down trees, and led what was perceived by the officials as unsanitary lives. In 1906, the provincial government introduced a colonisation bill, extending official powers over the canal colonies. This placed strict rules on inheritance and introduced retrospective conditions concerning sanitation, tree planting, and construction. Before the bill, the government had been relying on fines to punish any offenders, relying on a large retinue of locally employed staffers to oversee it, who were, as one British official remarked, "practically certain to make the greatest possible use of any opportunities they may have for extorting bribes." The rampant corruption placed the zamindars under increasing economic strain, which was exacerbated by crop failures in 1905 and 1906, and an increase in water rates in 1906. These conditions led to a level of agitation previously unseen during British rule in the Punjab known as the 1907 Punjab unrest.

== Economic impact ==
The Punjab, despite being only 9.7 per cent of the total area of British India, had by 1931 9,929,217 acres irrigated by canals colonies, the largest area in British India, and representing 46 per cent of the total land irrigated by canals. This was two and a half times greater than the Madras Presidency, second in this category. The canal irrigated area in the Punjab increased from 3 million acres in 1885 to 14 million acres by the end of British rule in 1947.

The canal colonies acted as a primary industrialising agent in the Punjab. By 1921 the proportion of the population supported by agriculture was lesser in the colony districts relative to in the non-colony districts, because a significant population in the colony districts was engaged in industrial pursuits. For example, in Lyallpur alone 326 ginning factories emerged to serve her own cotton fields. By converting barren land into productive agricultural land, the Punjabi government was able to increase export output and maximise revenue through taxes on the increased produce. The increased supply of produce in turn meant investment was needed in the road and rail network to transport the goods to market. The larger size of the holdings in the colonies, together with improvements to the transport infrastructure and other marketing facilities had a large positive impact on the settler's income.

Prior to the establishment of the colonies, many farmers in the Punjab were in debt to money-lenders. However, with the increased incomes in the colonies, the proportion of debt owed to traditional money-lenders was considerably less than in other non-colony areas. Furthermore, by obtaining the grants at nominal prices, the settlers were able to enjoy the vast capital appreciation of their land as it grew increasingly productive. By the 1920s, thirty years after the establishment of the Chenab Colony, the average land price in Lyallpur was Rs. 1200 providing a capital gain of 9,900 percent.

A significant beneficiary of the colonisation was the city of Lyallpur, now Faisalabad, originally named after Sir James Broadwood Lyall who pioneered the Chenab colony. At the time of the British annexation in 1849 it was a barren wasteland, and by 1891 the region had a population density of mere 7 persons per square mile. It was characterised by nomadic tribes and notorious criminals, with the Sandal Bar area being named after the Chuhra bandit Sandal. By 1901, in just a decade, the population had reached 187 persons per square mile, was 301 in 1921 and 927 in 1998. Lyallpur, renamed Faisalabad in the 1970s, is currently the third most prosperous city of Pakistan in terms of GDP per capita.

All these canal colonies eventually became part of Punjab Irrigation Department after the creation of Pakistan in 1947.

== See also ==
- Settlement types
  - Chak (village)
  - Dhani (settlement type)
  - Hamlet (place)
  - Subah or Taraf, Pargana or Mahal, Mauza or Pir
- Land forms
  - Bagar tract
  - Barani, Nehri and Nalli
  - Doab
  - Khadir and Bangar
- General
  - Johad
  - Punjab region
