= Sikhism in Brazil =

Sikhism in Brazil Sikhismo no Brasil

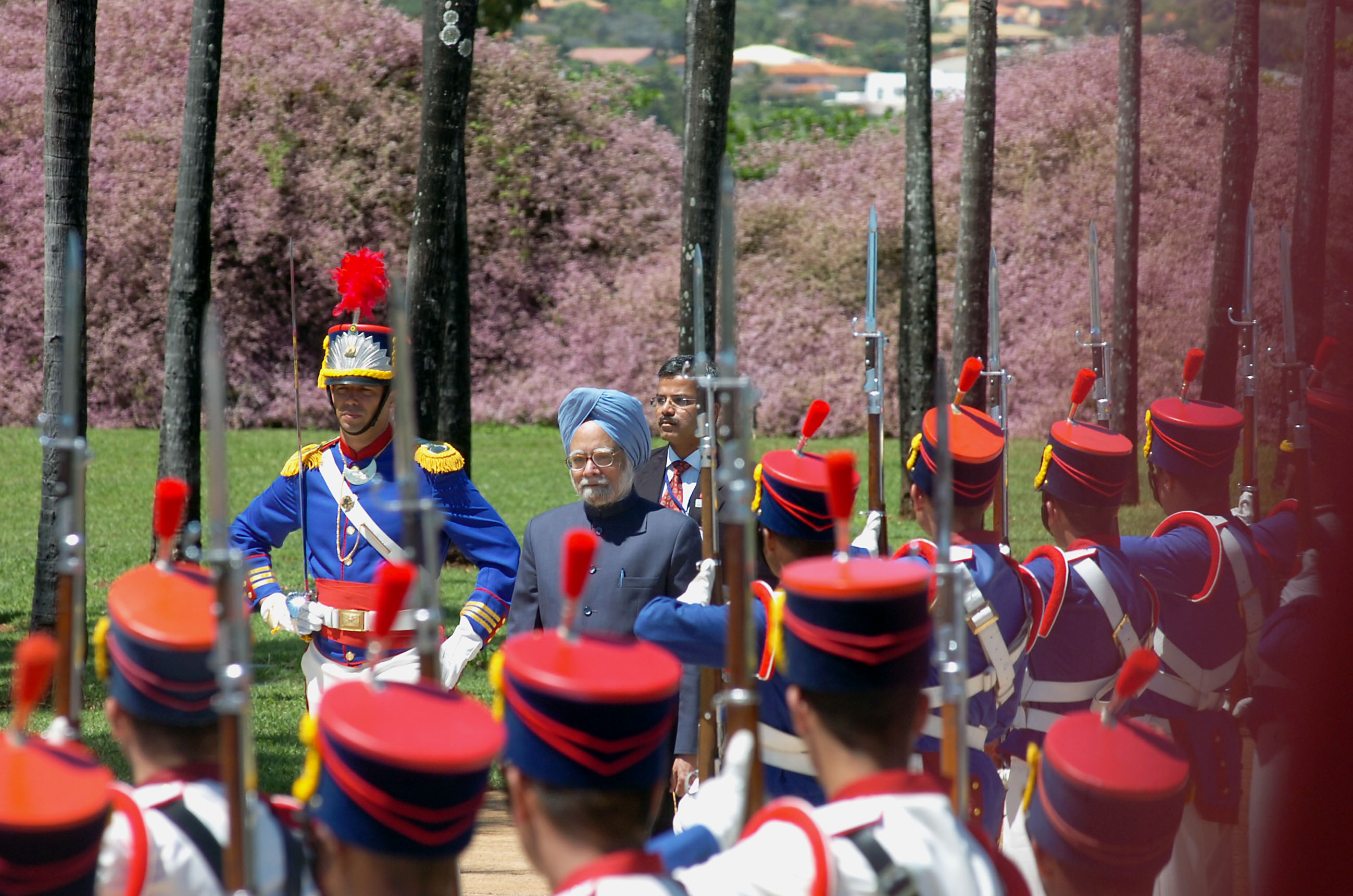
- Dr. Manmohan Singh at Palácio da Alvorada, Brazil

Total population
- 300

Regions with significant populations
- Rio de Janeiro · São Paulo

Languages
- Brazilian Portuguese · Punjabi • Hindi • Urdu

Sikhs in Brazil are a religious minority and there are estimated to be around 300 Sikhs living in the country.

== History ==
=== Early 20th Century ===
Brazilian Sikhs started with the arrival of the first Sikh immigrants in the early 20th century. These immigrants came to Brazil seeking better economic opportunities, and they settled primarily in the southern part of the country, in the Brazilian state of Paraná. However, most Sikhs went to Brazil to reach Argentina.

=== 21st Century ===
In 2018, a delegation of Brazilian Sikhs visited the Golden Temple in Amritsar, India, to plead for gender equality within the Sikh community. The delegation included both men and women, and they called for the removal of restrictions on women's participation in some Sikh religious ceremonies.

== Demographics ==
Most Sikhs in Brazil belong to the 3HO community or Punjabi migrants, who have come for business opportunities. The descendants of earlier immigrant generation have largely married outside of the culture and religion due to the lack of a large Sikh population.

== Gurdwara ==
The Sikh community in Brazil has established several gurdwaras, or places of worship, throughout the country. One of the most well-known gurdwaras is the Shri Arjun Dev Sahib Gurdwara in the city of São Paulo, which was inaugurated in 1987. This gurdwara is the first and largest Sikh temple in Brazil and has become a symbol of the Sikh community's presence in the country.

== See also ==
- Sikhism in South America
- Sikhism in Argentina
- Sikhism by country
- Indian immigration to Brazil
- Sikhism in Panama
