= 1907 Punjab unrest =

Protests against 1906 colonisation bill

The 1907 Punjab unrests were a period of unrest in the British Indian province of Punjab, principally around the Colonisation bill that was implemented in the province in 1906. This timeline has often been called the beginning of the freedom movement in Punjab. Important leaders of this movement include Sardar Ajit Singh, among others.

== Colonisation Bill ==
Passed in 1906 as an amendment to earlier canal colony regulations, the Colonisation Bill intensified widespread agrarian discontent in Punjab. Building on earlier dissatisfaction caused among urban and commercial classes by the Punjab Land Alienation Act of 1900, the 1906 legislation altered land inheritance terms by enforcing strict primogeniture. Under its provisions, if an allotment holder died without direct male heirs, the property reverted to the colonial administration rather than passing to extended family, allowing the government to re-grant or transfer the land. Viewed by local agricultural communities as an unwarranted infringement on traditional property rights and custom, these terms met universal opposition across both urban leadership and rural landholders in the region.

== Agitation ==
Opposition to the Government's measures was led by Sardar Ajit Singh, an uncle of Bhagat Singh, who called for "extreme measures" in resisting the legislation. The first protests were organised in the Chenab Colony, considered among the districts most affected by the bill; various organisations submitted memoranda to the government seeking redress, but these were largely disregarded. The agitation subsequently spread to Lyallpur, where a meeting attended by several thousand people was addressed by both Ajit Singh and Lala Lajpat Rai in March 1907. Unrest also extended to the railway workforce at Rawalpindi, and disturbances were reported in Amritsar and Lahore.

The movement contributed to the formation of secret societies, including the Anjuman-i-Muhibban-i-Watan, said to have been founded by Ajit Singh with the support of Lajpat Rai. As the agitation gathered momentum, the colonial government moved to suppress it: in May 1907, both Ajit Singh and Lajpat Rai were deported to Mandalay, Burma, under emergency powers.

== British Indian Army Mutiny ==
In 1907, two years after the 1905 Partition of Bengal, British Indian Army soldiers in the 6th Jat Light Infantry and 10th Jats mutinied and sided with Bengali revolutionaries to take over the government treasury. The colonial government suppressed their revolt and several mutineers were sentenced to prison.

== Bibliography ==
- The Indian Army and the Making of Punjab By Rajit K Mazumder. p. 203. Published by Orient Longman, 2003. ISBN 81-7824-059-9
- The Garrison State: The Military, Government and Society in Colonial Punjab. by Tai Yong Tan. p. 95. Published by SAGE, 2005. ISBN 0-7619-3336-0
- The History of British India: A Chronology. by John F. Riddick. p. 92 Published by Greenwood Publishing Group, 2006. ISBN 0-313-32280-5
