= Indians in Argentina =

Indian Argentines
Indo-argentinos (Spanish)
- (Argentina) (India) (Guyana) (Trinidad and Tobago) (Suriname)
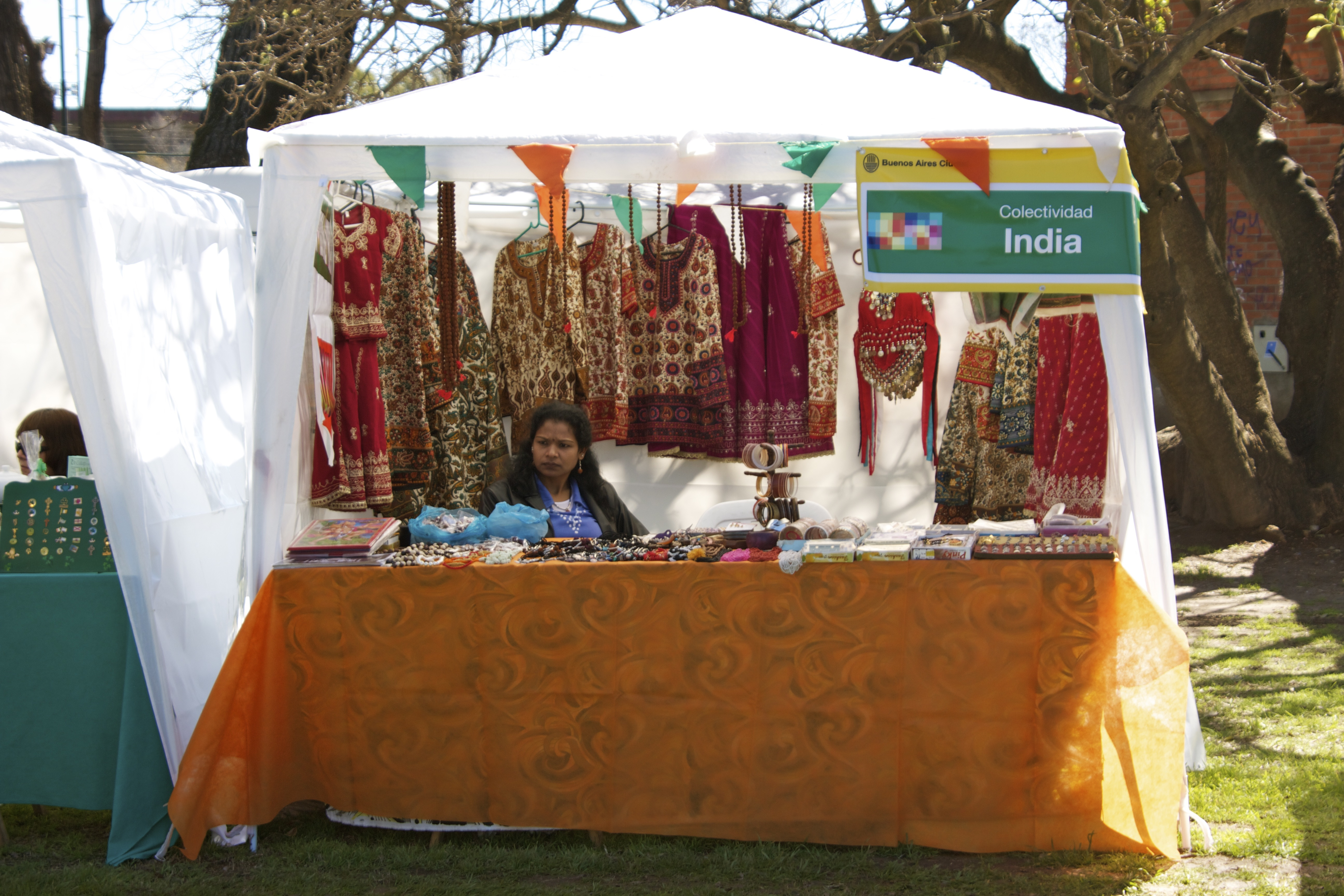
- Indian Argentines during the Immigrant's Day 2010 in Buenos Aires.

Total population
- 2,600 (by ancestry, 2025); 0.01% of the Argentina's population

Regions with significant populations
- Buenos Aires · Rosario de la Frontera

Languages
- Majority: Spanish · Punjabi · Hindustani; Minority: English · Dutch · Sranan Tongo

Religion
- Majority: Hinduism · Sikhism; Minority: Christianity · Islam

Related ethnic groups
- Indo-Aryans · Dravidians; Indo-Caribbeans · Indian Mexicans · Indian Americans · Indian Brazilians · Others

Indian Argentines (Spanish: Argentinos Indios), also known as Indo-Argentines (Spanish: Indo-argentinos), are Argentines who have predominantly or total Indian ancestry. There is a small community of Indians in Argentina who are mainly immigrants from India and the neighboring countries in South America and the Caribbean with Indo-Caribbean influence (i.e. Guyana, Trinidad and Tobago and Suriname) and some of whom were born in Argentina and are of Indian heritage, related to the Indo-Aryan and Dravidian peoples, so the term can also include descendants of Pakistanis, Nepalis, Bengalis and Sinhalese.

== History ==
The first Indians to arrive in Argentina were Sikhs from the Indian state of Punjab who came to Argentina in the early 20th century to work on a British-built railroad. In the 1970s, others came after being barred entry to Canada and the United States, the preferred destinations, along with Britain, for the emigrants.

Argentina seemed the most promising of South American nations, and so they stayed, eventually concentrating in the north, which reminded them of the scrappy mountains and plains of Punjab. Most of the immigrants settled in Rosario de la Frontera. This remote northern Argentine town is home to the only Sikh gurdwara in South America. Today, there are about 300 Sikhs in Argentina, many of whom run supermarkets and other shops. Mixed marriages with Catholic Argentines are common.

A large number of Indians living in Buenos Aires are businessmen, doctors, financial or business executives, and employees of multinational corporations. Most of them have retained their Indian citizenship. Many Indo-Caribbeans from places like Guyana, Trinidad and Tobago, and Suriname have also migrated to Argentina.

== Demographics ==
Salta is the province that has the largest Indian community, with about 550 immigrants, the first of whom arrived there in 1937. Rosario de la Frontera has a population of 70 Hindus originally from India. The latter formed a family in the city, increasing their descendants by approximately 250 people, making it the city with the largest Hindu community in Argentina. There are also Sikh surnames in Metán, in Orán and in the City of Salta.

By 2001, it was estimated that there were 1,600 Indians in Argentina. Some studies carried out by the University of the Salvador indicated that there were 2,226 Indians throughout the country, of which 25% of them are in Salta. The rest is distributed especially between Buenos Aires, Jujuy, Tucumán, Córdoba, among other provinces. The majority groups are Sikhs and Hindus.

== Culture ==
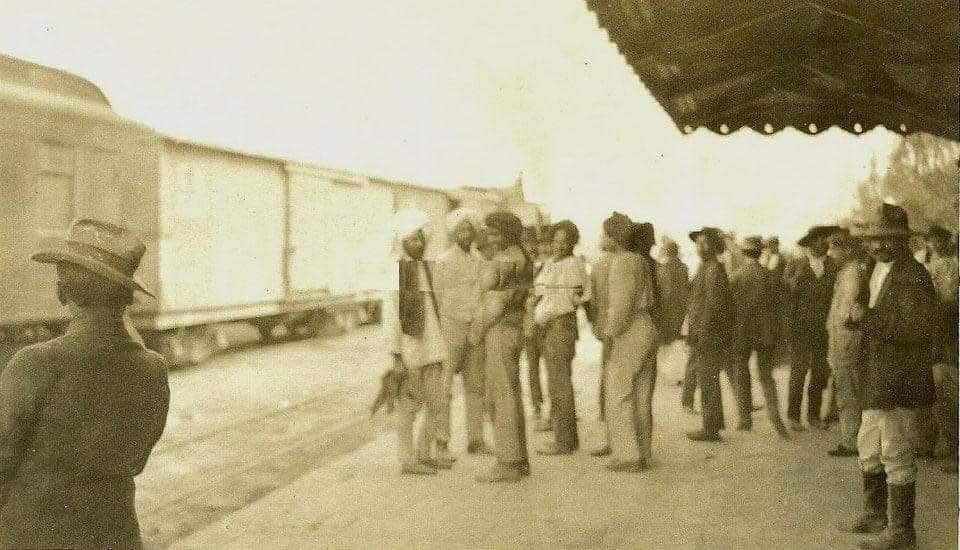
Sikh Sugar Mill Workers in San Pedro de Jujuy (1912).

The Indian community in Argentina has established an Indian Association in the northern provinces to organize social and cultural events to celebrate Indian festivals such as Diwali. Some community members are involved in keeping traditional cultural practices alive, such as ayurveda, yoga, Indian classical music and the Hindustani language and Punjabi language.

The Don Torcuato based sports club Hindú Club traces its origin to Indian laborers, mainly from Bihar and Bengal, who were brought to South America for rubber plantation. Those immigrant workers were fundamental in founding the club in 1895.

== See also ==
- Argentina–India relations
- Argentines
- Ethnic groups of Argentina
- Culture of Argentina
- Indian diaspora
- Hinduism in Argentina
- Sikhism in Argentina
