= Brazil–India relations =

- Brazil: India

Diplomatic mission
- Embassy of Brazil, New Delhi: Embassy of India, Brasília

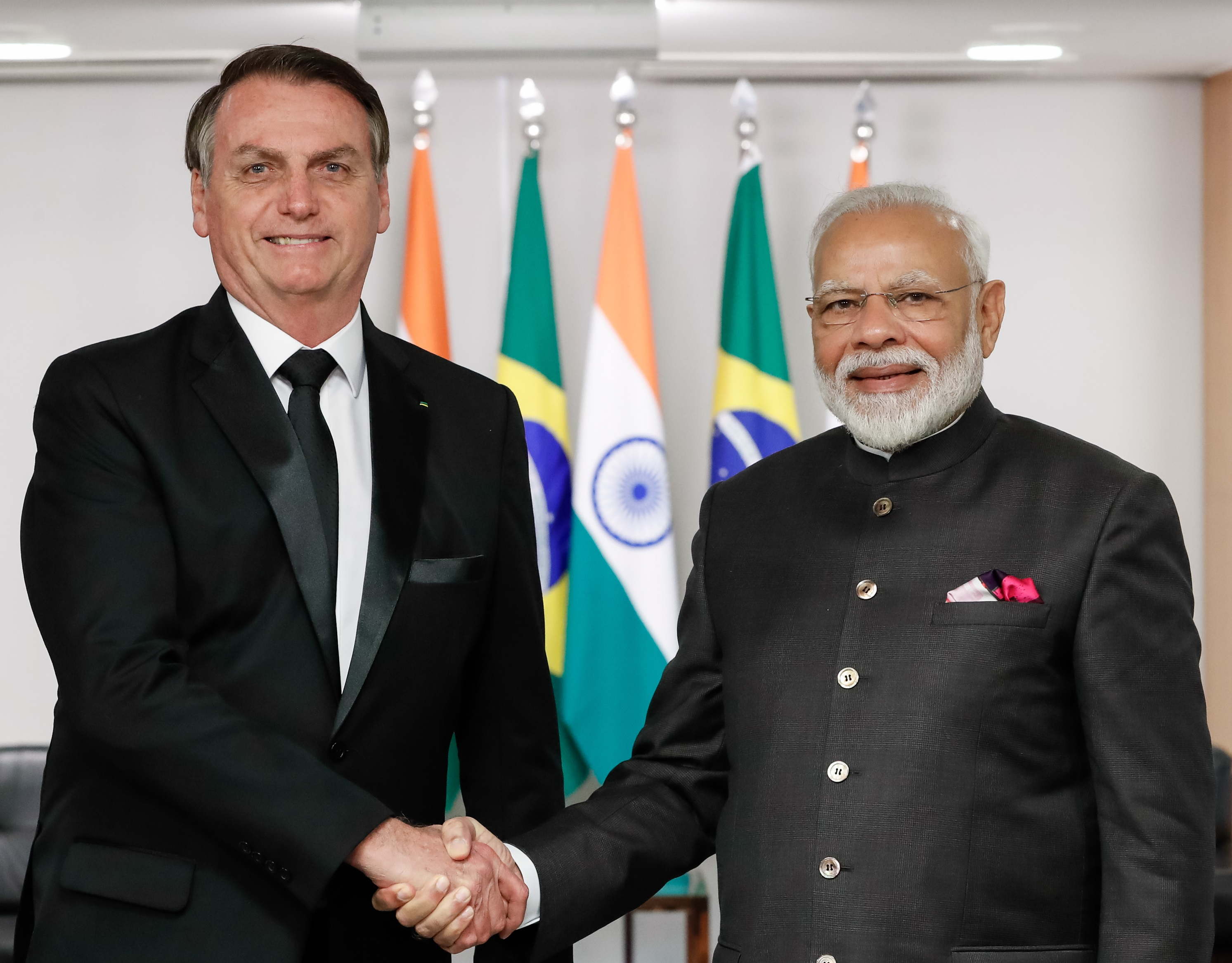
Indian Prime Minister Narendra Modi and Brazilian President Jair Bolsonaro, November 2019.

Brazil–India relations are the bilateral relations between Brazil and India.

Brazil was the first Latin American nation to establish diplomatic relations with India in 1948. The ties were elevated to a strategic partnership in 2006, opening a new phase in the bilateral relations. Both the countries are members of BRICS, G-20, IBSA and G4. The Brazilian president Jair Bolsonaro was the chief guest at the Republic Day celebrations of India in 2020.

According to a 2013 BBC World Service Poll, only 16% of Brazilians view India's influence positively. Indian opinion on Brazil is also sharply divided, with 20% viewing Brazil positively and 18% viewing Brazil negatively.

== History ==
India's links with Brazil go back five centuries. Portugal’s Pedro Álvares Cabral is officially recognised as the first European to “discover” Brazil in 1500. Cabral was sent to India by the King of Portugal after the return of Vasco da Gama from his pioneering journey to India. Cabral is reported to have been blown off course on his way to India. Brazil became an important Portuguese colony and stop-over in the long journey to Goa. This Portuguese connexion led to the exchange of several agricultural crops between India and Brazil in the colonial days. Indian cattle was also imported to Brazil. Most of the cattle in Brazil is of Indian origin. During the Portuguese Empire, chillis were traded from the New World to India and cows were sent the other way, amongst other trades.

=== Contemporary era ===
Indira Gandhi on a visit to Brazil, 1968, National Archives of Brazil

Diplomatic relations between India and Brazil were established in 1948. The Indian Embassy opened in Rio de Janeiro on May 3, 1948, moving to Brasília on August 1, 1971.

One of the major sources of tension between the two nations was the decolonisation process of the Portuguese enclaves in India, principally Goa. Despite pressure from India on Portugal to retreat from the subcontinent, Brazil supported Portugal's claim for Goa. Brazil only changed course in 1961, when it became increasingly clear that India would succeed in taking control of Goa by force from an increasingly feeble Portugal, which faced too many internal problems to pose a potent military threat to India. Still, when Nehru's armies overwhelmed Portuguese resistance and occupied Goa, the Brazilian government criticised India sharply for violating international law. While Brazil tried to explain to India that its position was to be understood in the context of a long tradition of friendship between Brazil and Portugal, the Indian government was deeply disappointed that Brazil, a democratic and a former colony, would support a non-democratic Portugal against democratic and recently independent India.

In 2009, Brazil approved the sale of 100 MAR-1 anti-radiation missiles to Pakistan despite India's pressure on Brazil not to do so. Brazil's Defense Minister Nelson Jobim called these missiles "very effective ways to monitor" areas flown by war planes, and said the deal with Pakistan was worth €85 million (US$167.6 million). He dismissed protests by India. "Brazil negotiates with Pakistan, not with Pakistani terrorists," Mr Jobim said. "To cancel this deal would be to attribute terrorist activities to the Pakistani Government."

== Economic relations ==
Brazil and India have co-operated in the multilateral level on issues such as international trade and development, environment, reform of the UN and the UNSC expansion. The two-way trade in 2007 nearly tripled to US$3.12 billion from US$1.2 billion in 2004. In 2016, trade between the two nations had increased to US$5.64 billion.

== 21st century relations ==
=== UNSC reform ===
Both countries want the participation of developing countries in the UNSC permanent membership since the underlying philosophy for both of them are: UNSC should be more democratic, legitimate and representative - the G4 is a novel grouping for this realisation.

=== South-South cooperation ===
Brazil and India are involved in the IBSA initiative. The first ever IBSA Summit was held in Brasília in September 2006, followed by the Second IBSA Summit held in Pretoria in October 2007, with the third one held in New Delhi in October 2008. The fourth IBSA meet was again hosted in Brasília, just before the second BRIC summit. Four IBSA Trilateral Commission meetings were already held till 2007 since the first one was held in 2004 and had covered many areas such as science, technology, education, agriculture, energy, culture, health, social issues, public administration and revenue administration. The target of US$10 billion in trade was already achieved by 2007.

Both countries view this as a tool of transformation diplomacy to bring economic growth, sustainable development, poverty reduction and regional prosperity in the vast regions of Latin America, Africa and Asia. The IBSA Fund for Alleviation of Poverty and Hunger has already provided funds for capacity building in East Timor and for the fight against HIV/AIDS in Burundi and has won the South-South Partnership Award at the 2006 UN Day event held in New York City on 19 December 2006.

=== Prime Minister Narendra Modi's 2014 trip ===
In July 2014, the Indian Prime Minister Narendra Modi visited Brazil for his first multilateral visit, the 6th BRICS summit was held at the north-eastern beach city of Fortaleza. In the Fortaleza summit the group have agreed to establish a financial institution rivaling the Western-dominated World Bank and IMF, The bank would be named the New Development Bank as suggested by the Indian side but the contributing parties could not come to an agreement to base the bank's headquarters at New Delhi. Later the BRICS leader also attended an event in Brasília where they met the UNASUR heads of government. At the same time, the Ministry of External Affairs added Spanish to its list of available languages, which the Hindustan Times read as "indicative of the government's intent to go beyond Europe, Asia and the US to forge diplomatic and trade ties with Latin American nations." He travelled there via Germany.

=== Bolsonaro administration ===
Relations between India and Brazil further improved after the election of Jair Bolsonaro as President of Brazil in October 2018. Bolsonaro's administration took similar sceptical stances to India on relations with China, particularly with regards to the Belt and Road Initiative.

This culminated in Bolsonaro attending the Delhi Republic Day parade as chief guest in January 2020, along with a delegation of Brazilian officials. During the visit, both Modi and members of the Brazilian delegation such as Ernesto Araújo and Eduardo Bolsonaro stressed the role of ideological ties in the growing relations between the countries, given the shared nationalist outlook of the countries’ respective leaders. Immediately prior to Bolsonaro's visit, the Brazilian Ambassador endorsed the Indian government's stance that the implementation of the 2019 Citizenship (Amendment) Act and the revocation of the special status of Jammu and Kashmir were internal issues for India.

== Cultural relations ==
Indian cultural exports such as yoga and cinema have received increasing interest in Brazil. Indians in Brazil have contributed to setting up spiritual centers.

== Resident diplomatic missions ==
of Brazil in India

- New Delhi (Embassy)
- Mumbai (Consulate-General)

of India in Brazil

- Brasília (Embassy)
- São Paulo (Consulate-General)

== See also ==
- Foreign relations of Brazil
- Foreign relations of India
- Brazilians in India
- Indian immigration to Brazil
