= Sikhism in Panama =

Total population
- Unknown

Regions with significant populations
- Panama City

Religions
- Sikhism

Languages
- Panamanian Spanish • Punjabi • Hindi • Urdu

Sikhism in Panama took its roots when the Panama Canal was started in 1890. Construction of the rail-road link between the Atlantic and Pacific Oceans began in 1850. With the boom of labour opportunities, immigrants saw Panama as a place of fortune. Sikhs came first as construction workers for the transcontinental rail road link. During 1864, among the population of New Grenada, which contained Panama City, out of 2.7 million people, 160,000 were Sikh. A large number of Sikhs settled there after the project.

== Spread ==
Sikhs worked on digging the canal as manual labourers, as little machinery was available. Punjabi and specially Sikh labourers worked in difficult conditions, meeting challenges of yellow fever. British and American officials preferred Sikh labourers over others because of their perceived work ethic and characteristics that could withstand harsh conditions.

The canal was completed in 1913–14. Sikhs maintained a weekly congregation, reciting Gurbani path, in houses by rotation. Early Punjabi settlers started working in jobs like watchmen or sold daily use articles as petty businessmen, until they were absorbed in Panama Canal construction work. With the completion of the canal, many of them had earned enough money to set up businesses or became landowners and farmers. One of them was Rattan Singh, who built his financial company, and became a founding father of Gurdwara Guru Nanak Sahib, Panama along with Parkaish Singh and many others from their voluntary contributions. Gurdwara is well established and was inaugurated in 1986. Gurdwara is managed by Guru Nanak Sahib Civic Society, Panama.

== Higher education ==
One weekly congregation resulted in the formation of Panamanian Medical and Management Corporation of Higher Education (PMMC) which set forth a Medical degree programme in Panama.

== Present generation ==
After the construction and the establishment of American military bases in Panama, many new immigrants, including Sikhs, settled there as permanent residents. Interviews of some fourth generation Panamanian Sikhs revealed settlers engaged in financial businesses, owning financial companies, owning agricultural lands, cultivating bananas and other crops, owning department stores, restaurants, etc. Some of them joined civil and military services. Many, such as Sindhi Sikhs believe, in the ten gurus and attend the Gurdwara regularly. Only one Gurdwara operates in Panama. Interviews by Sikh Channel discuss the presence of 4th generation Sikhs in Panama.
