= Indian immigration to Brazil =

Indians in Brazil
Total population
- 25,639 (2024)

Regions with significant populations
- São Paulo; Rio de Janeiro; Manaus; Foz do Iguaçu; Curitiba

Languages
- Portuguese; Various Indian Languages; English

Religion
- Hinduism; Christianity; Islam; Sikhism

Related ethnic groups
- Indo-Caribbeans, Indian Argentines and Luso-Indians

There is a small community of Indians in Brazil who are mainly immigrants and expatriates from India. As of 2024, there are currently 25,639 people of Indian origin living in the country and a majority of them live in São Paulo and Rio de Janeiro. There are also a number of people of Indian origin (mainly from the former colony of Portuguese Goa) who came to Brazil from both Britain's and Portugal's African colonies in the later half of the twentieth century.

== Migration history ==
=== Early Indian presence in Brazil ===
The earliest Indians to arrive in Brazil were Indian seamen or Lascars, known as "Lascarim" in Portuguese. They arrived between the sixteenth and mid-seventeenth century, when the most important parts of the Portuguese Empire were their colonies in Asia. These included Diu, Daman, Bombay, Thana, Goa, Cochin and some smaller settlements in Hugli River.

Later as the settlement of coastal Brazil developed, many governors, Catholic clerics, and soldiers who had formally served in Asia arrived with their Asian wives, concubines, servants and slaves. Later Luso-Indian servants and clerics connected with the religious orders, such as the Jesuits and Franciscans, and spice cultivators arrived in Brazil.

In the eighteenth century there were Luso-Indians arriving in Brazil on ships of the English East India Company.

=== 20th century Indian Immigration to Brazil ===
- The first wave of Indian immigration to Brazil began when a small number of Sindhis had arrived there from Suriname and Central America (mainly from Belize and Panama) in the 1960s to set up shop as traders in the city of Manaus.
- The second wave of immigration consisted of university professors to Rio de Janeiro from Bangalore, Goa, and New Delhi who arrived in the 1960s and also in the 1970s.
- Other people of Indian Origin migrated to that country from various African countries, mainly from former Portuguese colonies (especially Mozambique), soon after their independence in the 1970s. The number of PIOs in Brazil has been augmented in recent years by the arrival of nuclear scientists and computer professionals.

== Current status ==
There are as many as 1,500 PIOs and only 400 NRIs besides the descendants and only since foreign nationals can acquire local citizenship without any discrimination after 15 years of domicile in this country. Brazil has also no bar against dual citizenship, although India does ban its citizens from obtaining dual citizenship. But in recent years, it has been granting immigration visas only in high technology fields. The only exceptions are the Sindhis in Manaus and the immigrants and descendants in Rio de Janeiro and São Paulo.

Most of the Indians living in Brazil have not only been able to assimilate themselves in the Brazilian way of life but also maintain close cultural and economic connection with India.

== Notable people ==
- Suresh Biswas (1861–1905), adventurer from British India
- Ashok Gandotra (born 1948), cricketer
- Froilano de Mello (1887–1955), microbiologist from Goa
- Nathalia Kaur (born 1990), model, Bollywood actress and opera singer
- Sadhan Kumar Adhikari, Brazilian physicist

== See also ==
- Brazil–India relations
- Asian Brazilians
- Asian Latin Americans
- Brazilians in India
- Bangladeshi immigration to Brazil
- Caminho das Índias
- Pakistanis in Brazil
- Romani people in Brazil
- Sikhism in Brazil
