= Paquito (footballer, born 1974) =

Brazilian footballer

Personal information
- Full name: Juliano Pescarolo Martins
- Date of birth: 26 August 1974 (age 52)
- Place of birth: Recife, Brazil
- Height: 1.87 m (6 ft 1 1/2 in)
- Position: Forward

Senior career*
Years	Team	Apps	(Gls)
1998	Inter Limeira		
1999–2001	Salgueiros	44	(7)
2001–2002	Aves	24	(10)
2002–2003	Covilhã	32	(9)
2004	Ceará		
2005	Kingfisher East Bengal		
2006	Guarany Sobral		
- * Club domestic league appearances and goals

Juliano Pescarolo Martins (born 26 August 1974), commonly known as Paquito, is a Brazilian retired footballer who played as a forward.

== Football career ==
Born in Recife, Paquito played in his country with lowly Associação Atlética Internacional (Limeira) and Ceará Sporting Club, also having played four years in Portugal, with S.C. Salgueiros in the first division and C.D. Aves and S.C. Covilhã in the second, in the 1999/early 2000s.

In 2005, before returning home to retire with amateurs of Guarany Sporting Club, Paquito also played in India.
