= Sardar Ajit Singh =

Indian revolutionary (1881–1947)

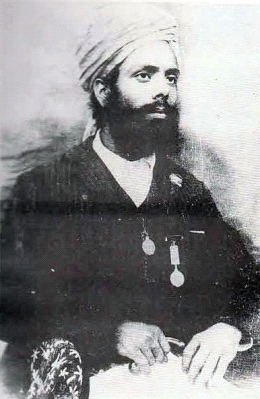
- Born: 23 February 1881; Khatkar Kalan, Jullundur district, British India (present-day Shaheed Bhagat Singh Nagar, Punjab)
- Died: 15 August 1947 (aged 66); Dalhousie, East Punjab, India
- Known for: Pagri Sambhal Jatta Movement
- Notable work: Bharat Mata Society, Bharat Mata journal
- Movement: Indian independence movement
- Relatives: Bhagat Singh (nephew)

Sardar Ajit Singh (23 February 1881 – 15 August 1947) was an Indian revolutionary and nationalist during the time of British rule in India and known for his role in organising agitations against anti-farmer laws known as the Punjab Colonisation Act (Amendment) 1906. He led the Pagri Sambhal Jatta Movement and was exiled to Mandalay jail in Burma in 1907 with Lala Lajpat Rai. An inspiration to his nephew Bhagat Singh, Ajit Singh spent 38 years in exile, continuing his revolutionary activities abroad. He died on 15 August 1947, the day India gained independence.

== Biography ==
=== Early life and education ===
Sardar Ajit Singh was born on 23 February 1881 in Khatkar Kalan village, located in the Jullundur district (now Shaheed Bhagat Singh Nagar) of Punjab, British India. He was born into a Jat Sikh family, with his parents being Arjan Singh and Jai Kaur. Ajit Singh's early education took place at Saindas Anglo Sanskrit School in Jalandhar, where he completed his metric studies. He later enrolled in Law College in Bareilly, Uttar Pradesh, to pursue a legal education. However, his growing involvement in the Indian freedom movement led him to abandon his law studies.

Arya Samaj philosophy, which emphasised social reform and nationalism, had a profound influence on Singh and his family. This philosophy also significantly impacted his nephew, Bhagat Singh, who later become one of India's most iconic revolutionary.

=== Entry into the freedom movement ===
Singh's entry into the freedom movement was marked by his participation in agitations against the British colonial policies. In 1906, he organised protests against the Punjab Colonisation Act (Amendment) 1906 and the Bari Doab Canal Act increased water rates and revenue rates by 25%.

=== Pagri Sambhal Jatta movement ===
In 1907, Ajit Singh initiated the Pagri Sambhal Jatta Movement, a significant peasant uprising against the British government's policies. The movement aimed to protect farmers’ rights and resist unjust laws. The slogan “Pagri Sambhal Jatta” (Take care of your turban, O farmer) became a rallying cry for the movement.

=== Exile to Burma (Myanmar) ===
In May 1907, Singh, along with Lala Lajpat Rai, was exiled to Mandalay in Burma (presently Myanmar) by the British authorities. This was a tactic to suppress the growing unrest in Punjab. However, due to immense public pressure and the fear of unrest in the Indian Army, the exile orders were withdrawn, and both were released on 11 November 1907.

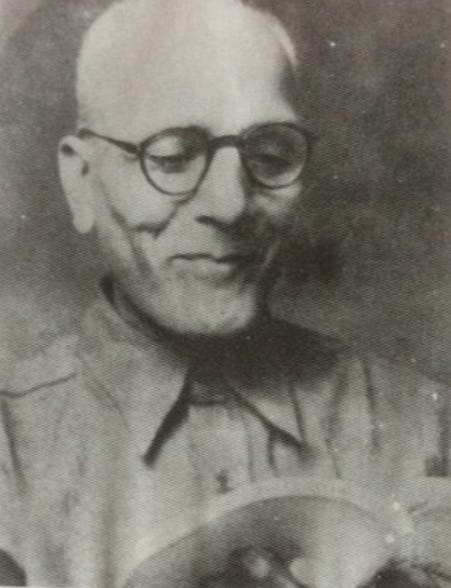
Ghadar Party member, Sardar Ajit Singh in Rio de Janeiro, Brazil, ca.1940

After his release, Ajit Singh continued his revolutionary activities. Along with his brothers Kishan Singh and Swaran Singh, and Sufi Amba Prasad, he published political literature criticizing the British government. In 1909, Ajit Singh and Sufi Amba Prasad escaped to Iran to avoid arrest, remaining in exile for 38 years. During his exile, Ajit Singh traveled extensively, including to Rome, Geneva, Paris, and Rio de Janeiro.

In 1918, Singh came into contact with the Ghadar Party in San Francisco, which was involved in revolutionary activities against British rule. He also taught Persian at a university in Naples during World War II and delivered speeches in Hindustani to Indian soldiers in North Africa, encouraging them to join the fight for India's independence. His efforts abroad were aimed at garnering international support for the Indian independence movement.

=== Return to India and death ===
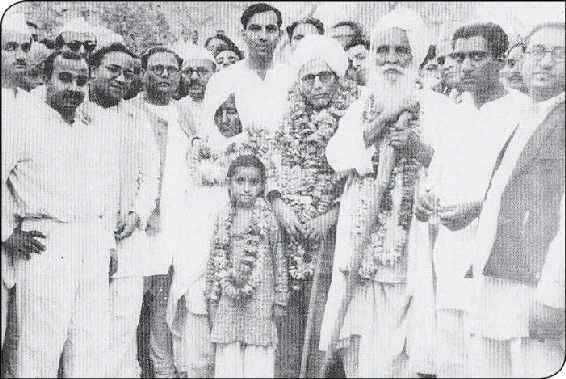
Photograph of the welcoming ceremony of Sardar Ajit Singh after his return from exile abroad, Lahore, April 1947

Ajit Singh finally returned to India after interventions of Jawaharlal Nehru, who had taken over as India's acting prime minister. On 7 March 1947 Singh traveled back to India via London. He spent some time in Delhi before moving to Dalhousie, Himachal Pradesh. Singh died on 15 August 1947, the day India became independent from British rule.

== Legacy ==
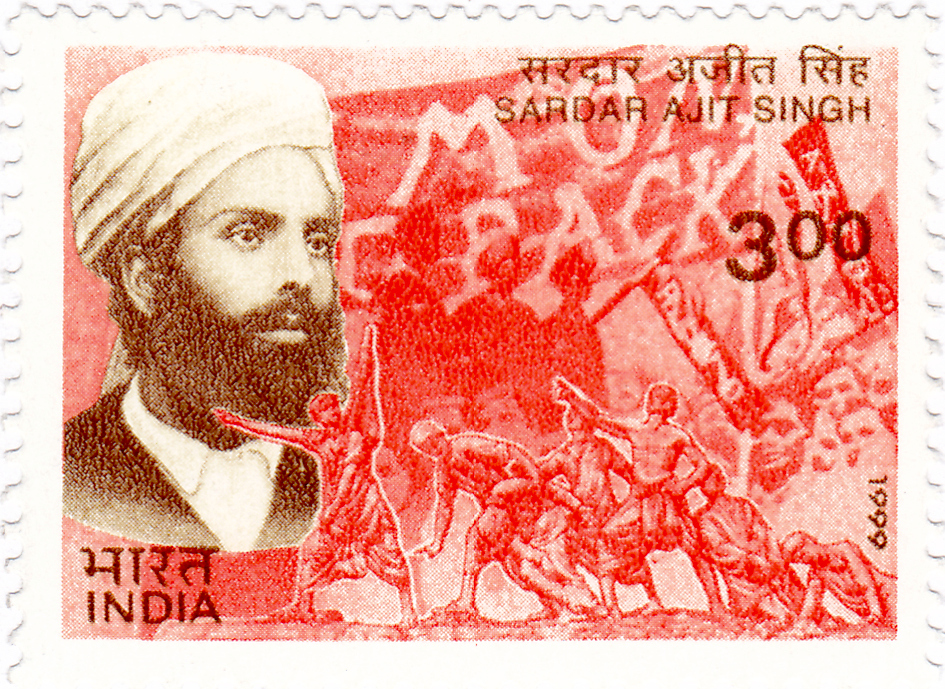
Sardar Ajit Singh on a 1999 stamp of India

Ajit Singh established the Bharat Mata Society and published a journal named “Bharat Mata” which was later compiled into a book.

His leadership in the Pagri Sambhal Jatta Movement and his role in agitating against anti-farmer laws are particularly notable. A samadhi in his memory is located at Panjpula, Dalhousie, a popular and scenic picnic spot in Dalhousie, serving as a reminder of his enduring legacy.

In his last testament, Singh wrote:

“Our poor India is unfortunate to get Balkanised. People living together for centuries were coming closer and closer to each other and had jointly contributed to the culture, civilization and national thought. But ambitious politicians hankering after personal power, under the patronage of foreign rulers, through conspiracy, abuse of religious fanaticism and ignorance of masses, have been busy in doing the greatest disservice to the future generations. The seeds of disunion, sowed by the foreign rulers, have brought forth the tree which is now bearing its calamitous fruit in the shape of vivisection of the motherland. Solid foundations of future troubles have been thus laid down.”
