= Chhattisgarh Division =

Administrative division of the Central Provinces of British India

Coordinates: 20°55′N 82°00′E

- Division of British India
- 1853–1947
- Flag

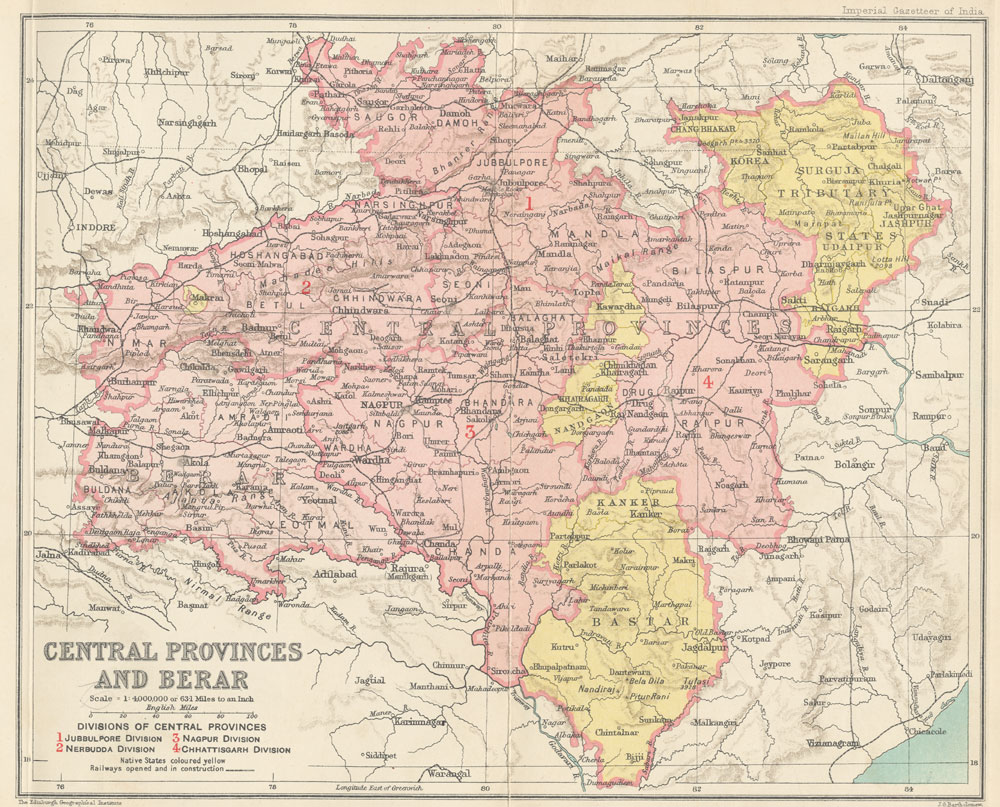
- 1909 map of the Central Provinces with the Chhattisgarh Division in the east.
- Capital: Raipur
- Area
  - 1901: 55,011.3 km^{2} (21,240.0 sq mi)
- Population
  - 1901: 3,283,226
- History
  - Creation of the division: 1853
  - Independence of India: 1947
| Preceded by | Succeeded by |
| Nagpur kingdom | Madhya Pradesh |
- This article incorporates text from a publication now in the public domain: Chisholm, Hugh, ed. (1911). "Chhattisgarh". Encyclopædia Britannica. Vol. 6 (11th ed.). Cambridge University Press. p. 116.

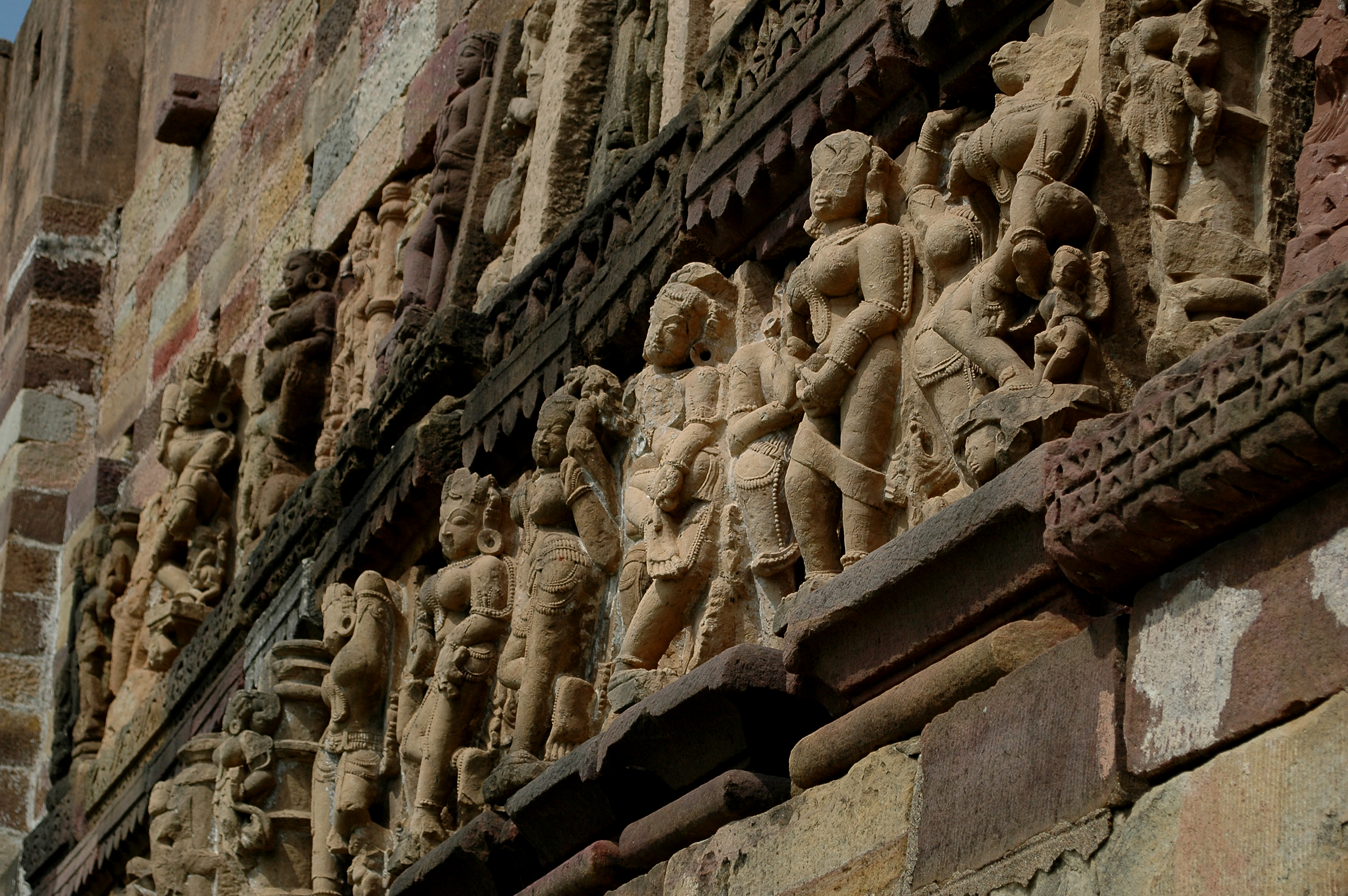
Wall sculptures in Ratanpur Fort.

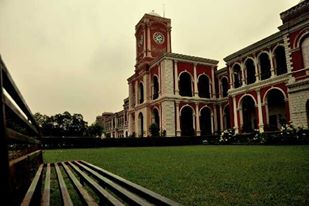
Rajkumar College, built in Raipur during the British Raj.

Chhattisgarh Division was an administrative division of the Central Provinces of British India. It was located in the eastern part of the Central Provinces and encompassed the upper basin of the Mahanadi River, in the central part of present-day Chhattisgarh, India.

With the advent of British rule, the town of Raipur, the headquarters of Chhattisgarh Division, gained prominence over Ratanpur, the historical capital of the territory. The Central Provinces became the Central Provinces and Berar in 1936 and remained so until the Independence of India. The major languages spoken in the division were Chhattisgarhi, Odia, Hindi, and numerous tribal languages.

== History ==
Chhattisgarh Division was occupied by the Bhonsle Marathas and incorporated into the Kingdom of Nagpur in the 18th century. The Kingdom of Nagpur was annexed by British India in 1853, becoming Nagpur Province. In 1861, Nagpur Province was merged with the Saugor and Nerbudda Territories to form the Central Provinces. All the princely states of the Central Provinces were in Chhattisgarh Division, except for Makrai, which was in the Narmadapuram District of the Nerbudda Division.

In 1905, most of the Odia-speaking region of Sambalpur District, along with the princely states of Bamra, Rairakhol, Sonpur, Patna, and Kalahandi was transferred to Orissa Division of Bengal Province.

The princely states of Changbhakar, Korea, Surguja, Udaipur, and Jashpur were transferred from Bengal to the Central Provinces.

In 1933, the princely states in Chhattisgarh Division were transferred to the Eastern States Agency. On 24 October 1936, the Central Provinces became the Central Provinces and Berar when they were fully merged with Berar Province, although Berar remained under the nominal sovereignty of Hyderabad State.

== Territory ==
The Chhattisgarh Division was bounded to the north by the Chota Nagpur States, to the east by the Orissa Tributary States, to the south by the princely states of Bastar and Kanker, and on the west by Nagpur and Jabalpur divisions, as well as the princely states of Kawardha, Khairagarh, Chhuikhadan and Nandgaon.

=== Districts ===
The division included the following three districts:

- Raipur
- Bilaspur
- Sambalpur

== See also ==
- Central Provinces, Administration
