= Jubbulpore Division =

Administrative division in British India

Coordinates: 23°09′N 79°56′E

Jubbulpore Division जबलपुर
- Division of British India
- 1861–1947
- Flag

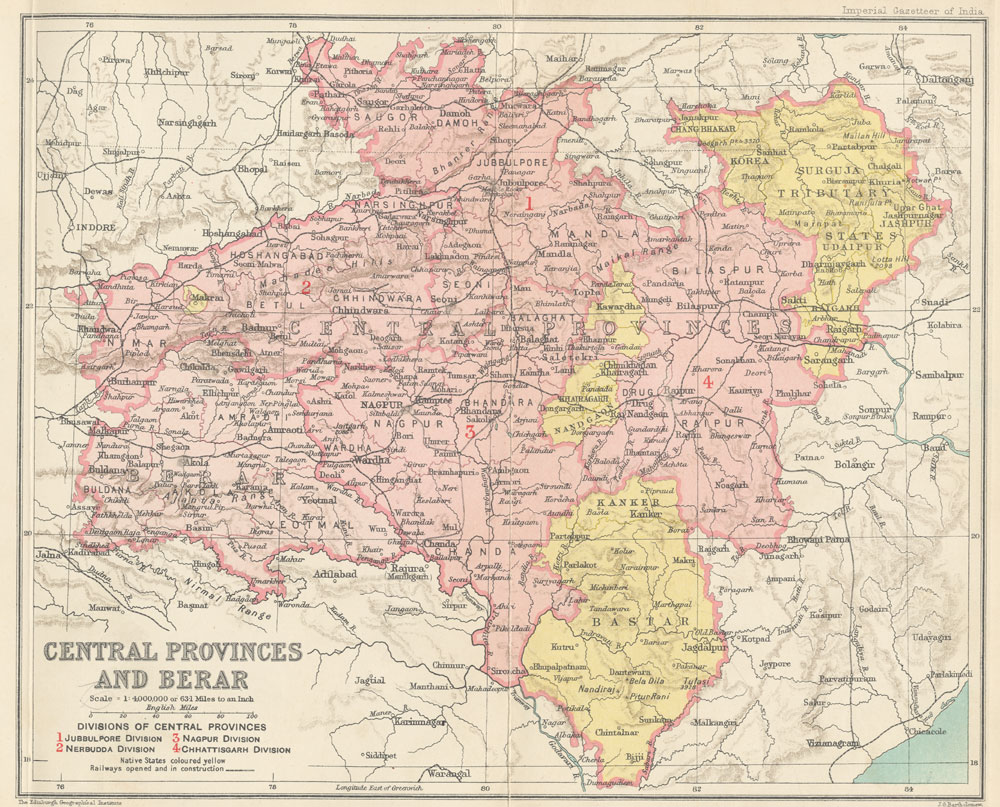
- 1909 map of the Central Provinces.
- Area
  - 1881: 48,401 km^{2} (18,688 sq mi)
- Population
  - 1881: 2,201,633
- History
  - Creation of the division: 1861
  - Independence of India: 1947
Preceded by	Succeeded by
Saugor and Nerbudda Territories	Madhya Pradesh

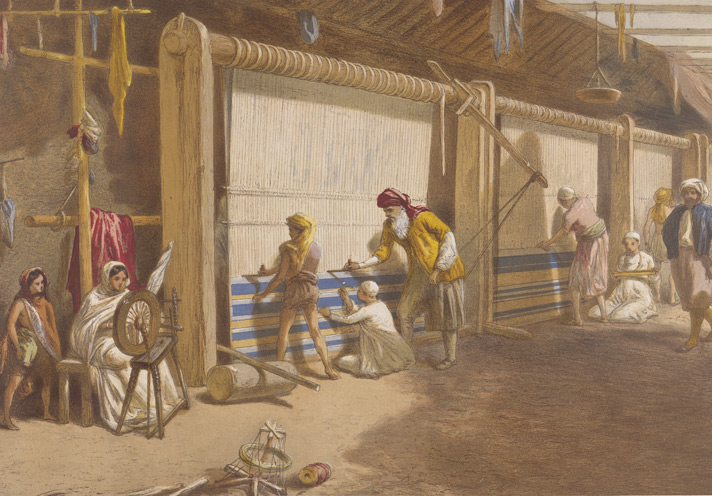
"The Thug School of Industry, Jubbulpore," a chromolithograph by William Simpson, 1867; this crafts school was meant for the children of dead or imprisoned thugs

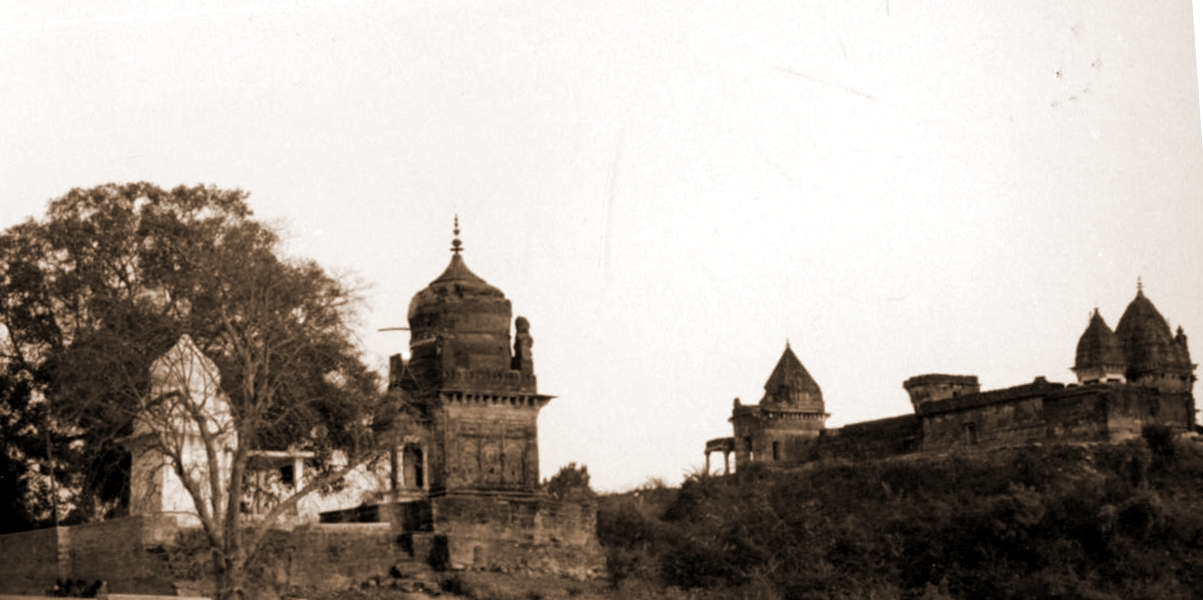
Temples in Lameta Ghat near Jubbulpore built by the Beohar dynasty in c. 16-18th century

The Jubbulpore Division, named after its capital Jabalpur (Jubbulpore), was one of the four former administrative divisions of the Central Provinces of British India. It was located in the Mahakoshal region of present-day Madhya Pradesh state of India. The Jubbulpore Division had an area of 48,401 km² with a population of 2,201,633 in 1881.

The Central Provinces became the Central Provinces and Berar in 1936 until the Independence of India.

== History ==
Immediately after occupation of the area around Jubbulpore the British authorities established a provisional administration under the superintendent of Political Affairs of Bundelkhand. In 1820 a division containing 12 districts was formed which was known as the Agency of the Saugor and Nerbudda Territories. This new division was placed under an agent of the general governor at Jubbulpore.

Jubbulpore Division was established in 1861 when the Saugor and Nerbudda Territories were merged with Nagpur Province, which the British had annexed in 1853, in order to form the Central Provinces.

== Territory ==
There were 11 towns and 8501 villages in the Jubbulpore Division. After the Independence of India it became the Jabalpur division of the state of Madhya Pradesh.

=== Districts ===
The Jubbulpore Division included the following districts:

- Sagar (Saugor)
- Damoh
- Jabalpur (Jubbulpore)
- Mandla
- Seoni

== See also ==
- Central Provinces, Administration
- Saugor and Nerbudda Territories
