= Jabalpur division =

Administrative unit of Madhya Pradesh, India

Coordinates: 23.1606°N 79.9386°E

Map of Jabalpur division

Jabalpur Division is an administrative geographical unit of Madhya Pradesh state of India. Jabalpur is the administrative headquarters of the division. As of 2023, the division consists of districts of Balaghat, Chhindwara, Jabalpur, Katni, Mandla, Narsinghpur, Dindori, Seoni and Pandhurna.

== History ==
Jabalpur Division was originally constituted as the Jubbulpore Division of the Central Provinces of British India in 1861. The British division included the districts of Jabalpur, Sagar, Damoh, Seoni, and Mandla. The Central Provinces became the Central Provinces and Berar in 1936 until India's independence from the United Kingdom in 1947.

Balaghat District was formerly part of the Central Provinces' Nagpur division, but became part of Jabalpur Division when the rest of Nagpur Division was transferred to Bombay State in 1956.

== See also ==
- Central Provinces, Administration
- Administrative divisions of British India
