= Nagpur Province =

Province of British India

Coordinates: 21.15°N 79.09°E

- Province of British India
- 11 December 1853–1861
- Flag

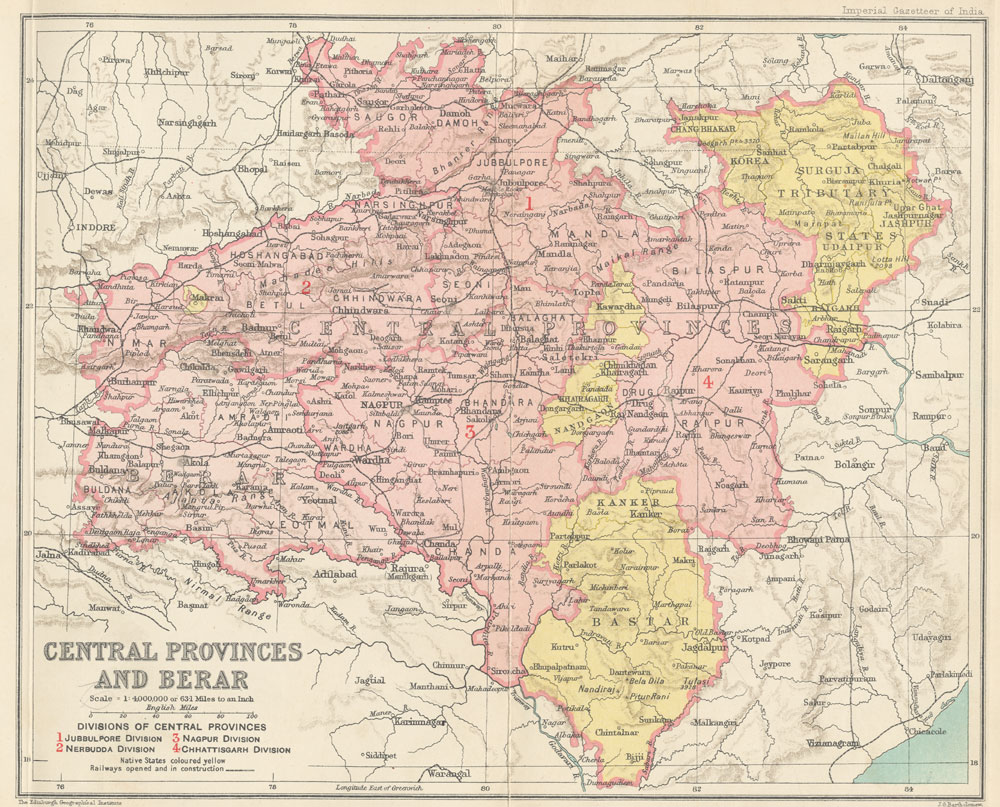
- Map of the Central provinces of British India
- Capital: Nagpur
- History
  - British annexation of Nagpur State: 11 December 1853
  - Merger with the Saugor and Nerbudda Territories: 1861
Preceded by	Succeeded by
Kingdom of Nagpur	Central Provinces

Nagpur Province was a province of British India that covered parts of the present-day states of Madhya Pradesh, Maharashtra, and Chhattisgarh. The city of Nagpur was the capital of the province.

In 1861, Nagpur Province was merged into the Central Provinces together with the Saugor and Nerbudda Territories.

== History ==
Nagpur Province was formed after the death of the heirless Maharaja Raghoji III in 1853. The British used the doctrine of lapse to justify the annexation of the princely state of Nagpur. The province included the domains of the Maratha Bhonsle Maharajas of Nagpur, powerful members of the Maratha Confederacy who conquered large tracts of central and eastern India in the 18th century. In 1818, at the conclusion of the Third Anglo-Maratha War, the Bhonsle Maharaja submitted to a subsidiary alliance, and Nagpur became a princely state under the suzerainty of the British crown. It was thereafter administered by a commissioner under the Governor-General of India.

In 1861, Nagpur Province was merged with the Saugor and Nerbudda Territories to constitute the new Central Provinces and Berar administrative division. The districts of Nagpur, Bhandara, Chada, Wardha, and Balaghat became the Nagpur Division of the new province, while Durg, Raipur, and Bilaspur became the Chhattisgarh Division. Chhindwara District was added to Nerbudda Division.

=== Districts ===
- Chhindwara
- Nagpur
- Bhandara
- Chanda
- Wardha
- Balaghat
- Durg
- Raipur
- Bilaspur

=== Provincial Commissioners ===
- C. G. Mansel (took office on 13 March 1854, before resident at Nagpur), 1854
- Captain Elliot, 1854 - 1855
- G. Plowden, 1855 - 1860
- (vacant) 1860 - 1861
