= Central Provinces =

Province of British India

Coordinates: 21.15°N 79.09°E

- Province of British India
- 1861–1903
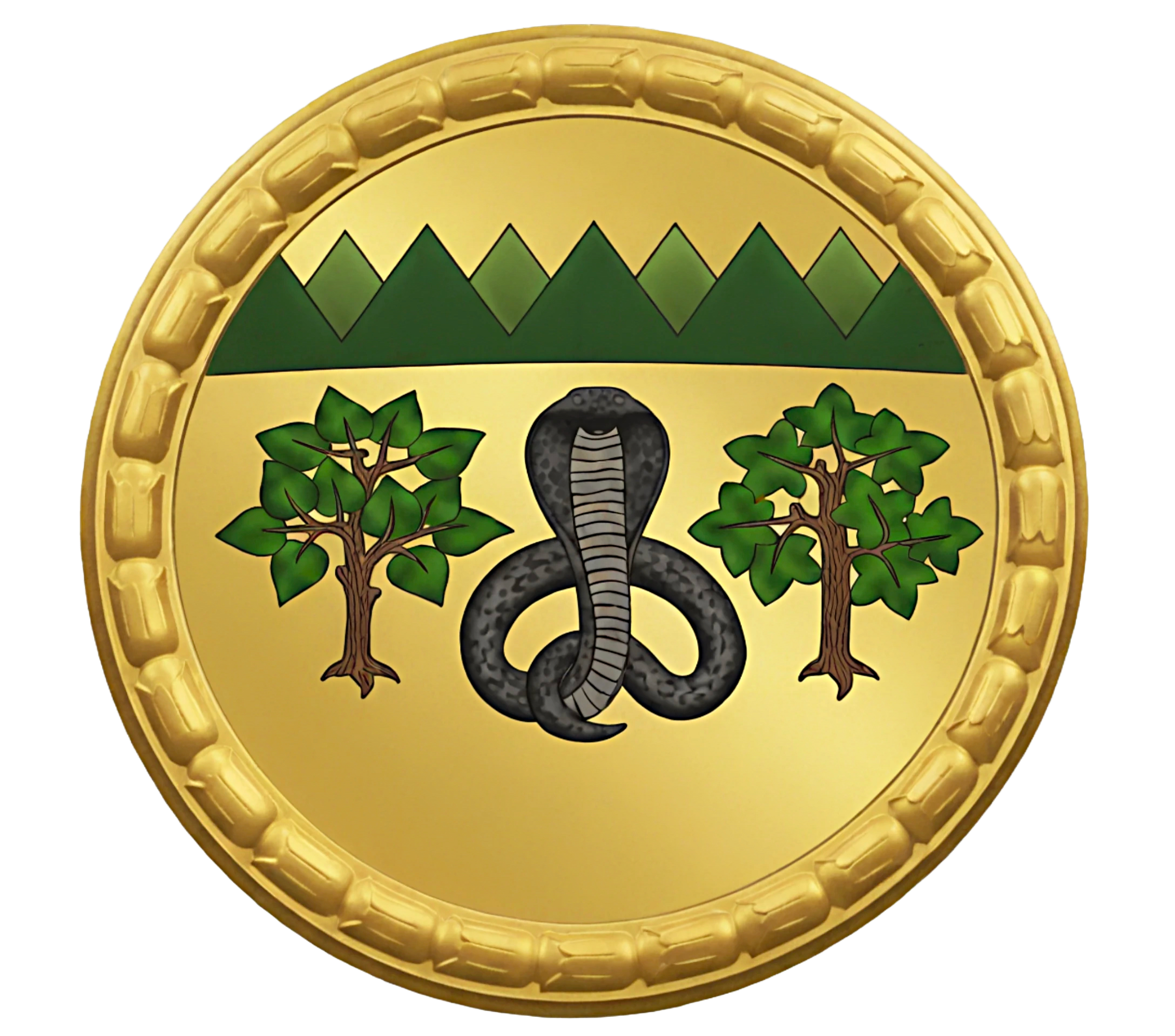
- Flag Coat of arms

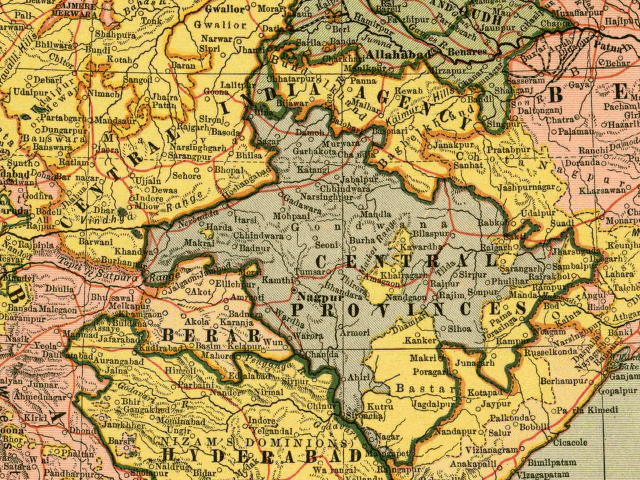
- Central Provinces and Berar in 1903, before the 1905 changes to the eastern boundary
- Capital: Nagpur (primary capital); Pachmarhi, Hoshangabad district (summer capital)
- History
  - Merger of the Saugor and Nerbudda Territories and Nagpur Province: 1861
  - Nimar added to Central Provinces: 1864
  - Creation of the Central Provinces and Berar: 1903
Preceded by	Succeeded by
Saugor and Nerbudda Territories; Nagpur Province	Central Provinces and Berar
- This article incorporates text from a publication now in the public domain: Chisholm, Hugh, ed. (1911). "Central Provinces and Berar". Encyclopædia Britannica. Vol. 5 (11th ed.). Cambridge University Press. pp. 681–3.

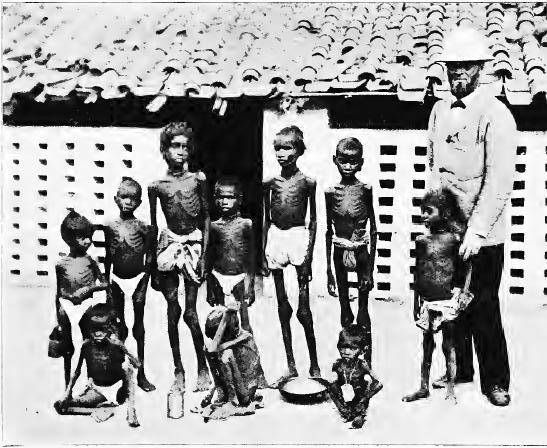
Famine stricken children in Jubbulpore, Central Provinces, in 1897

The Central Provinces was a province of British India. It comprised British conquests from the Marathas in central India, and covered parts of present-day Madhya Pradesh, Chhattisgarh and Maharashtra states. Nagpur was the primary winter capital while Pachmarhi served as the regular summer retreat. It became the Central Provinces and Berar in 1903.

The Central Provinces was formed in 1861 by the merger of the Saugor and Nerbudda Territories and Nagpur Province. The district of Nimar which was administered by the Central India Agency was added in 1864. It was almost an island encircled by a sea of "native States" such as Bhopal State and Rewa State to the north, the Chota Nagpur States and Kalahandi State to the east, and the Nizam's territories of Hyderabad to the south and Berar to the west.

== Geography ==
The Central Provinces was landlocked, occupying the mountain ranges, plateaus, and river valleys in the centre of the Indian subcontinent.

The northernmost portion of the state extended onto the Bundelkhand upland, whose northward-flowing rivers are tributaries of the Yamuna and Ganges. The Vindhya Range runs east and west, forming the watershed between the Ganges-Yamuna basin and the Narmada River basin, which occupies the center and west of the province, and flows westward to empty into the Arabian Sea. The upper Narmada valley forms the center of the Mahakoshal region. Jabalpur (formerly Jubbulpore) lay on the upper Narmada, and was an important railway junction.

The Satpura Range divides the Narmada valley from the Deccan Plateau to the south. The Central Provinces included the northeastern portion of the Deccan, drained by tributaries of the Godavari River including the Wainganga, Wardha, and Indravati. These flow east towards the Bay of Bengal. A portion of Berar lay in the upper basin of the Tapti River, which drains westward into the Arabian Sea. The portion of the Central Provinces on the Deccan Plateau formed the Vidarbha region, which includes Nagpur, the capital of the province.

The eastern portion of the state lay in the upper Mahanadi River basin, which forms fertile rice-growing region of Chhattisgarh. The Maikal Range separates the basins of the Narmada and the Mahanadi. The Chota Nagpur Plateau extended into the northeast corner of the province.

== Demographics ==
Historical population
Year	Pop.	±% p.a.
1866	9,000,000	—
1872	9,250,000	+0.46%
1881	11,500,000	+2.45%
1891	13,000,000	+1.23%
1901	11,873,029	−0.90%

General censuses were held in 1866, 1872, 1881, 1891 and 1901. The population in 1866 was over 9 million, and in 1872 over 9.25 million. 1869 was a famine year. There were epidemics of smallpox and cholera in 1872, 1878, and 1879. By 1881 the population had risen to 11.5 million, and by 1891 to nearly 13 million. The population in 1901 was 11,873,029, a reduction of 800,000 from 1891. The lack of summer monsoon rains in 1897 and 1900 led to widespread crop failures and huge famines in those years, and there were partial crop failures in four other years in the decade, with epidemics of cholera in seven of the ten years. A portion of the decrease (between one-eighth and one-quarter) was from emigration to Assam and other provinces of India.

=== Linguistic regions ===
The central Provinces contained two distinct linguistic regions: Mahakoshal, consisting mainly of Hindi-speaking districts, and Vidarbha, chiefly, but not exclusively, a Marathi-speaking area. The linguistic regions could not be fully integrated as a unit.

In the 1901 census, 6,111,000 (63% percent) of the population spoke variants of Hindi, chiefly Chhattisgarhi (27%), Bundeli (15%), Bagheli (10%) and Malvi or Rajasthani (5%). 2,107,000 (20%) spoke Marathi, the majority language of Wardha, Nagpur, Chanda, and Bhandara districts, and the southern portions of Nimar, Betul, Chhindwara, and Balaghat districts. Oriya speakers numbered 1,600,000, or 13.5%, but the transfer of Sambalpur District to Bengal in 1905 reduced the number of Oriya speakers to 292,000. There were 94,000 Telugu speakers, mostly in Chanda District. Of the 730,000 who spoke other Dravidian languages, the majority spoke Gondi, and 60,000 spoke Korku. 74,000 spoke Munda languages.

== Politics and administration ==
The Central Provinces were administered from 1861 to 1920 by a chief commissioner.

Administratively, the Central Provinces consisted of four divisions (Nerbudda, Jubbulpore, Nagpur, and Chhattisgarh), which were further divided into 18 districts - five districts in each division except Chhattisgarh, which had three districts. Berar was under the administrative authority of the Chief Commissioner for the Central Provinces, but administered separately. The Central Provinces also contained 15 princely states, which accounted for 31,188 square miles and a population in 1901 of 1,631,140, approximately 15% of the total population. The largest was Bastar, with an area of 13,062 miles, and the smallest was Satki, with an area of 138 square miles. The princely states were in Chhattisgarh Division, except for Makrai, which was in Hoshangabad District.

== See also ==
- List of governors of the Central Provinces and Berar
