= Makrai State =

Princely state in India (1663–1948)

Coordinates: 22°04′N 77°07′E

Makrai State मकराइ
- Princely State of British India
- 1663–1948
- Flag

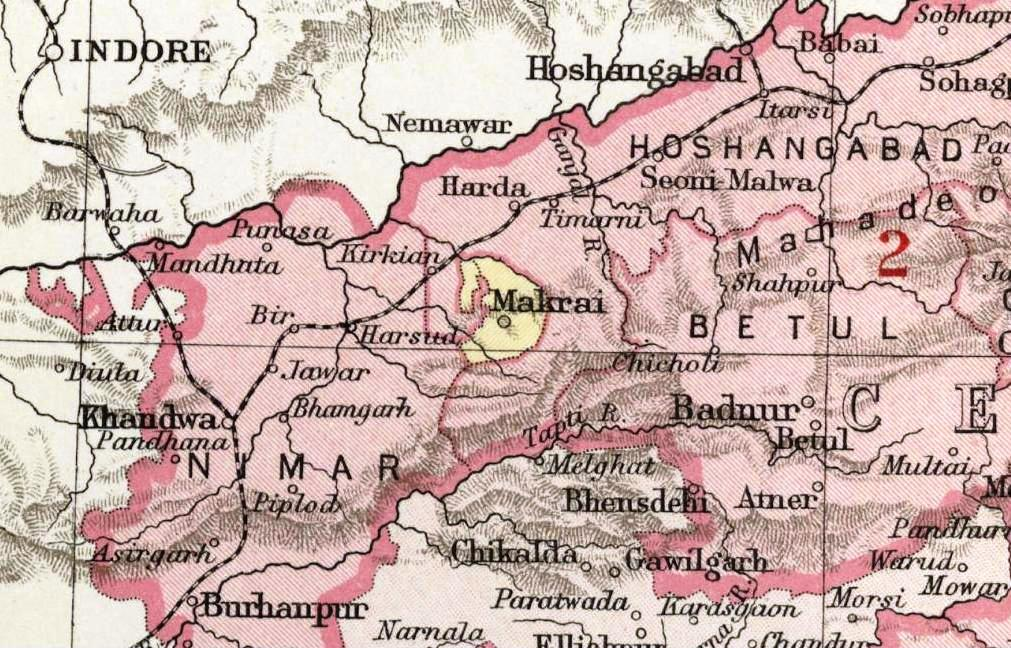
- Makrai State in the Imperial Gazetteer of India
- Capital: Makrai
- Area
  - 1901: 401 km^{2} (155 sq mi)
- Population
  - 1901: 13,025
- History
  - Established: 1663
  - Accession to the Union of India: 1948
Preceded by	Succeeded by
Raj Gond	India
- Today part of: Madhya Pradesh, India

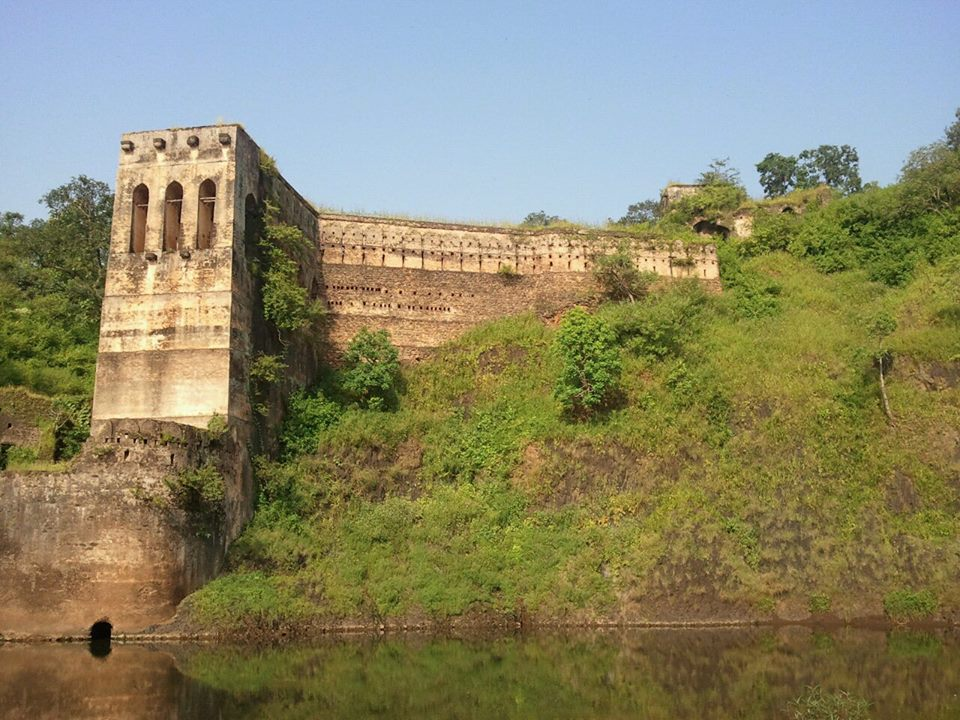
The ruined palace of the Rajas of Makrai State.

Makrai State was a princely state in India during the time of the British Raj. The seat was in Makrai.

In 1892 the state covered an area of 401 square kilometres (155 sq mi) forming an enclave surrounded by the British territory of the Nerbudda Division of the Central Provinces. Makrai State had a population of 16,784, which was reduced by famine to 13,025 by 1901. The state's rulers were of Rajput lineage and bore the title Maharaja. According to tradition the ruling family originally held the taluka of Kalibhit in [Harda] district.

== History ==
According to legend Makrai princely state was established in 1663 century by Gond Raja Karkat Rai who hailed from a family that owned land in Harda tehsil. In the 18th century the Scindia and the Peshwa warriors took over the forested areas of Kalibhit and Charwa from Makrai. In December 1890 the British government took over Makrai State under the doctrine of lapse owing to bad administration. Power was restored to the native ruler in 1893 under the condition that he appoint a Diwan (Minister) duly approved by the British Head Commissioner.

Makrai State was under the administrative authority of the Central India Agency until 1933, when it was transferred to the Bhopal Agency subdivision of the Central India Agency in 1933 from the Central Provinces and Berar.

After Indian independence in 1947, the rulers of Makrai acceded to the Union of India on 1 February 1948. The principality was incorporated into the state of Madhya Pradesh, which in turn was created from the territories under the former Central Provinces and Berar.

As of 2012, the titular Maharaja of Makrai is Raja Ajay Shah, born on 21 January 1956, married on 20 May 1986 and crowned on 21 December 1987.

=== Rulers ===
With the 26th Amendment to the Constitution of India, the Government of India abolished official recognition for all titles, classes and privy purses for heads of former princely states. However, many royal households continue succession and generally have limited social influence on their former subjects. The former Kings and Princes do not wield any legislative or jurisdictional power unless elected through general democratic representation. For Makrai, the ceremonial present ruler is Raja Sahib Ajay Kumar Shah, Raja of Makrai.

==== Rajas ====
Except for Rani Birj Kune, Rani of Makrai in 1749, all rulers were male.

- Makrand Shah, 1663 - ....
- Fateh Shah, married Rani Birj Kune, .... - ....
- Rani Birj Kune, 1749 - ....
- Dhar Shah, .... - ....
- Bharat Shah, 1765 - ....
- Udai Shah, .... - ....
- Devi Shah Hathriya Rai, 1832-1866
- Lacchu Shah Hathriya Rai [aka Bharat Shah]
- Lacchu Shah Hathriya Rai, 1866-1911
- Chhatrasal Shah Hathriya Rai, 1911-1918
- Drigpal Shah Hathriya Rai, 1918-1929
- Sahib Todar Shah Hathriya Rai, 1929, married to Uma Kuwar and had three sons: Yuvaraj Devi Shah, Bharat Shah and Vikram Kesri Shah.

==== Recent family History ====
Yuvraj Devi Shah, married Yuvarani Sita Rani Rana [now Rajmata Sita Rani Devi of Makrai], daughter of Shri Sthir Jung Rana of Nepal, and his wife, Rani Saheb Padma Kumari. Yuvraj Devi Shah has four sons (Raja Ajay Shah, Kuwar Vijay Shah, Kuwar Dhananjay Shah and Kuwar Sanjay Shah) and four daughters (Kiran Shah, Uma Shah, Purnima Shah and Archana Shah). Among sons, the first one is the present Raja of Makrai whc is married to Hemlata Kushwaha (d/o Kok Singh Kushwaha, Jagirdar of Harshi, dist Gwalior, originally from Narwar in district Shivpuri, and Tej Kumari Tomar of Nonera, district Bhind). They have two sons (Abhijeet and Rajyavardhan). Kuwar Vijay Shah is MLA from Harsood and former Cabinet Minister in BJP government of Madhya Pradesh and married to Bhawna Kushwaha of Bagli Jagir, District Dewas, Madhya Pradesh. They have one son (Divyaditya). Kuwar Dhananjay Shah is Additional Superintendent of Police in Madhya Pradesh and married to Priti Chakrawarti of Tikamgarh, Madhya Pradesh. They have one son (Apratim) and one daughter (Advitiya). Kuwar Sanjay Shah is MLA from Timarni, Madhya Pradesh, married to Shailja of Bardibas, Mahottari, Nepal. They have one daughter (Raima) and one son (Raibhaya).

Among the four daughters of Yuvraj Devi Shah, Kiran Shah is married to late Additional Commissioner Mahipal Singh of Bendi, Anuppur and they have one daughter (Sukriti) and two sons (Rudra Pratap and Narmada Pratap). Uma Shah is married to Dr Krishna Hamal of Pipal Bhanjyang, Udaypur district of Nepal, currently residing in Canberra, Australia, and they have two daughters (Natasha and Abhilasha). Purnima Singh is married to Yogendra Singh of Dhamkan Jagir, Muraina district, Madhya Pradesh, and they have two sons (Yuvraj and Dushyant). Archana Shah is married to Naresh Thapa of Chandanpur, Sankhuwa Sabha district of Nepal, currently residing in Canberra, Australia, and they have one daughter (Asmita).

Apart from this, PARE family of Nandwa village Harda District played and vital role, working as Priest and Advisors to the royal family.

== See also ==
- Bhopal Agency
- Political integration of India
