= Mahakoshal =

Coordinates: 23°09′N 79°56′E

Mahakoshal Mahakaushal
- Historical region of Central India
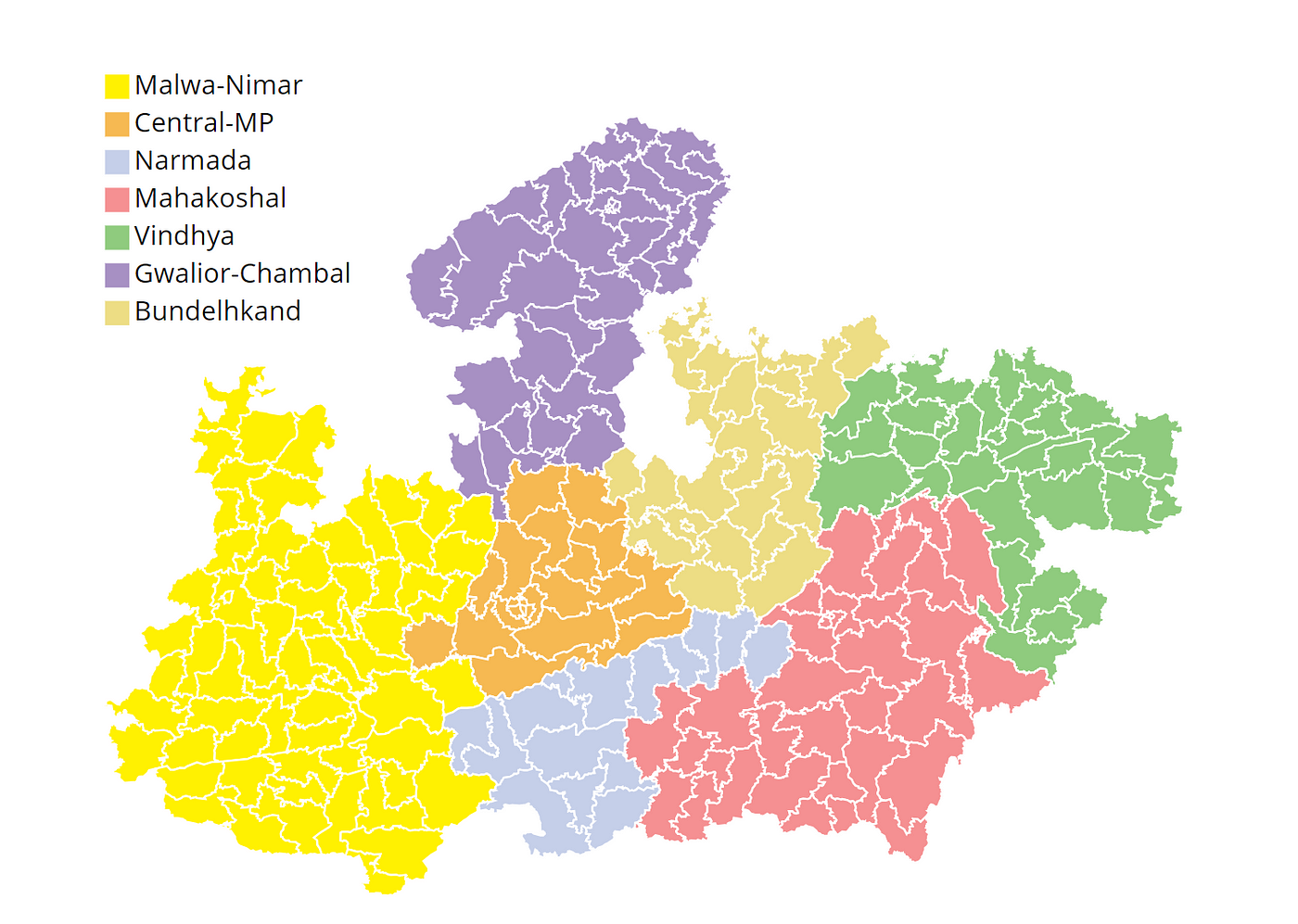
- Mahakoshal region of Madhya Pradesh (Not necessarily co-terminus with historical borders)
- Interactive map of Mahakoshal
- Country: India
- State: Madhya Pradesh

Mahakoshal or Mahakaushal is a region of central India. Mahakoshal lies in the upper or eastern reaches of the Narmada River valley in the Indian state of Madhya Pradesh. Jabalpur is the largest city in the region. Nimar region lies to the west, in the lower reaches of the Narmada valley.

Mahakoshal is a predominantly a Hindi-speaking area. Other languages used in the region include Bagheli and Marathi.

== Geography ==
The Vindhya Range forms the northern boundary of the region; north of the Vindhya Range lie the regions of Malwa to the northwest, Bundelkhand to the north, and Bagelkhand to the northeast. Chhattisgarh state lies to the east, and the Vidarbha region of Maharashtra state lies to the south across the Satpura Range. Cities and districts of the region include Jabalpur, Shahdol, Katni, Chhindwara, Narsinghpur, Mandla, Dindori, Seoni and Balaghat.

== History ==
Dynasties that held the territory include the Gonds, Kalachuri, Satavahanas, and Marathas. During the British Raj Mahakoshal was part of the Central Provinces which contained two distinct linguistic regions: Mahakoshal (Hindi and Gondi) and Vidarbha (Marathi). The two linguistic regions could not be fully integrated as a unit owing to regional and cultural differences.

== See also ==
- Central Provinces
- Mahakoshal Express
- Proposed states and territories of India
