= Nerbudda Division =

Coordinates: 22°45′N 77°43′E

- Division of British India
- 1853–1947
- Flag

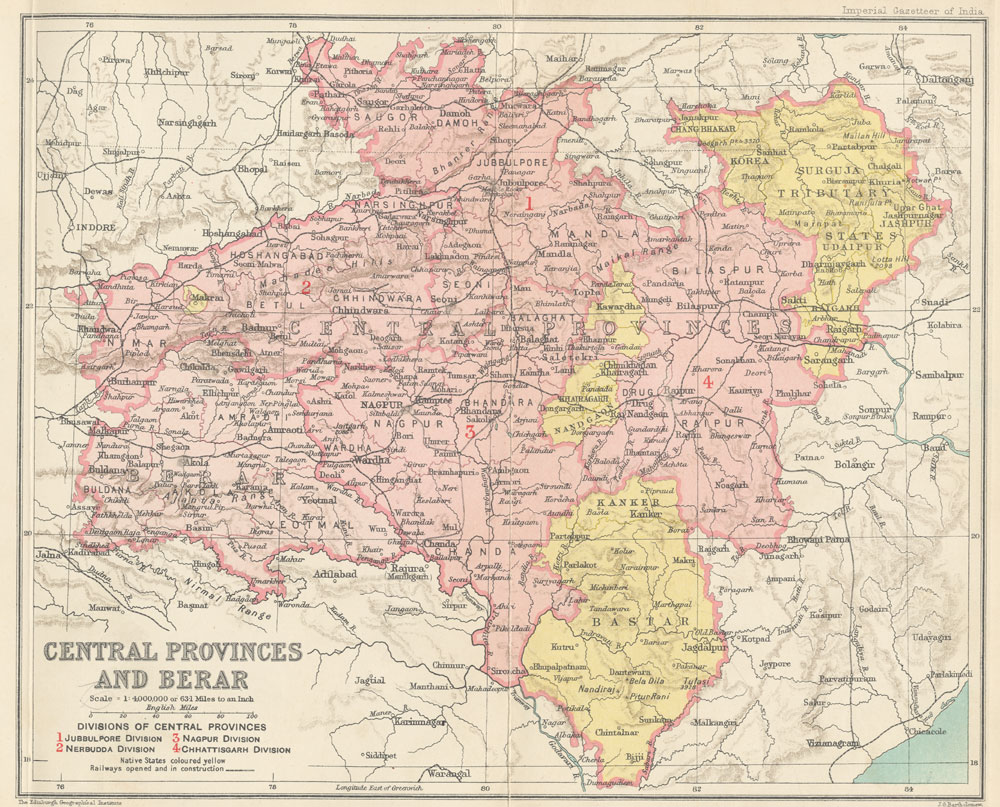
- 1909 map of the Central Provinces.
- Capital: Hoshangabad
- Area
  - 1901: 47,609.2 km^{2} (18,382.0 sq mi)
- Population
  - 1901: 1,785,008
- History
  - Creation of the division: 1853
  - Independence of India: 1947
Preceded by	Succeeded by
Nagpur kingdom	Madhya Pradesh

The Nerbudda Division, named after the Narmada River (Nerbudda), was a former administrative division of the Central Provinces of British India. It encompassed a good part of the Narmada River basin in the eastern part of present-day Madhya Pradesh state of India. The Nerbudda Division had an area of 47,609.2 km^{2} with a population of 1,785,008 in 1901.

The Central Provinces became the Central Provinces and Berar in 1936 until the Independence of India.

== Territory ==
The main mountains in the division were the Mahadeo Hills, the central part of the Satpura Range, where Pachmarhi, the summer hill station for British officials, and the Pachmarhi Cantonment were located.

The main towns in the division were Hoshangabad (15,863 inhabitants in 1881), Burhanpur (33,341 inhabitants in 1901) and Gadarwara (6,978 in 1901); other important towns were Khandwa, Harda, Narsinghpur, Chhindwara, Pandhurna, Sohagpur, Seoni and Mohgaon.

== Administrative divisions ==
=== Districts ===
The Nerbudda Division included the following districts:

- Narsinghpur
- Hoshangabad
- Nimar, present-day Khandwa (East Nimar)
- Betul
- Chhindwara

=== Princely states ===
Makrai State was the only princely state within the division and was under the supervision of the Nerbudda commissioner.

== See also ==
- Central Provinces, Administration
- Saugor and Nerbudda Territories
