= Saugor and Nerbudda Territories =

Region of British India in the early 20th century

Coordinates: 23°10′N 79°56′E

- Region of British India
- 1818–1861
- Flag
- Capital: Jubbulpore (Jabalpur)
- History
  - Territories captured by the British East India Company: 1818
  - Merger of the Saugor and Nerbudda Territories and Nagpur Province: 1861
Preceded by	Succeeded by
Marathas of Saugor	Central Provinces

The Saugor and Nerbudda Territories, was a region of British India, located in the central part of present-day Madhya Pradesh state in central India. It included the present-day districts of Sagar (Saugor), Damoh, Jabalpur, and Narsinghpur.

The region extended on either side of the Narmada River (Nerbudda). Jubbulpore (now pronounced 'Jabalpur') was the capital and the military headquarters of the territory. The city was one of the candidates for the administrative capital of British India, when the Government decided to move the capital outside Calcutta in 1911.

== History ==
The Saugor and Nerbudda Territories were captured by the British East India Company from the Marathas at the conclusion of the Third Anglo-Maratha War, in 1818. Saugor was the seat of a Maratha governor, and the northern portion of the territory was ceded by the Maratha Peshwa; the southern portion, which included Jubbulpore and the upper Nerbudda valley, was ceded by the Bhonsle Maharaja of Nagpur.

Immediately after the occupation, the British authorities established a provisional administration under the superintendent of Political Affairs of Bundelkhand. In 1820 a division containing 12 districts was formed which was known as the Agency of the Saugor and Nerbudda Territories. This new division was administered, from Jubbulpore, by an Agent to the Governor-General (AGG). In 1835 the Saugor and Nerbudda Territories were incorporated into the newly formed North-Western Provinces, which brought together the British Dominions in the southern portion of present-day Uttar Pradesh state.

In 1842–1843, during the Bundela rebellion, two Bundela landlords Jawahir Singh and Madhukar Shah rebelled against the British in Saugor district, spreading the unrest to Jabalpur District. Following the uprising the territory was placed again under the administration of an Agent to the Governor-General, Sir William Henry Sleeman, but the arrangement did not work well and in 1853 the Saugor and Nerbudda Territories were reattached to the North-Western Provinces.

In 1861 the Saugor and Nerbudda Territories were merged with Nagpur Province, which the British had annexed in 1853, in order to form the Central Provinces.

== See also ==
- North-Western Provinces
- Nerbudda Division
