= Punjab Province (British India) =

Province of British India

Province of Punjab
- 1849–1947
- Flag Emblem
- Motto: Crescat e Fluviis (Latin) "Let it grow from the rivers"
- Anthem: "God Save the King"
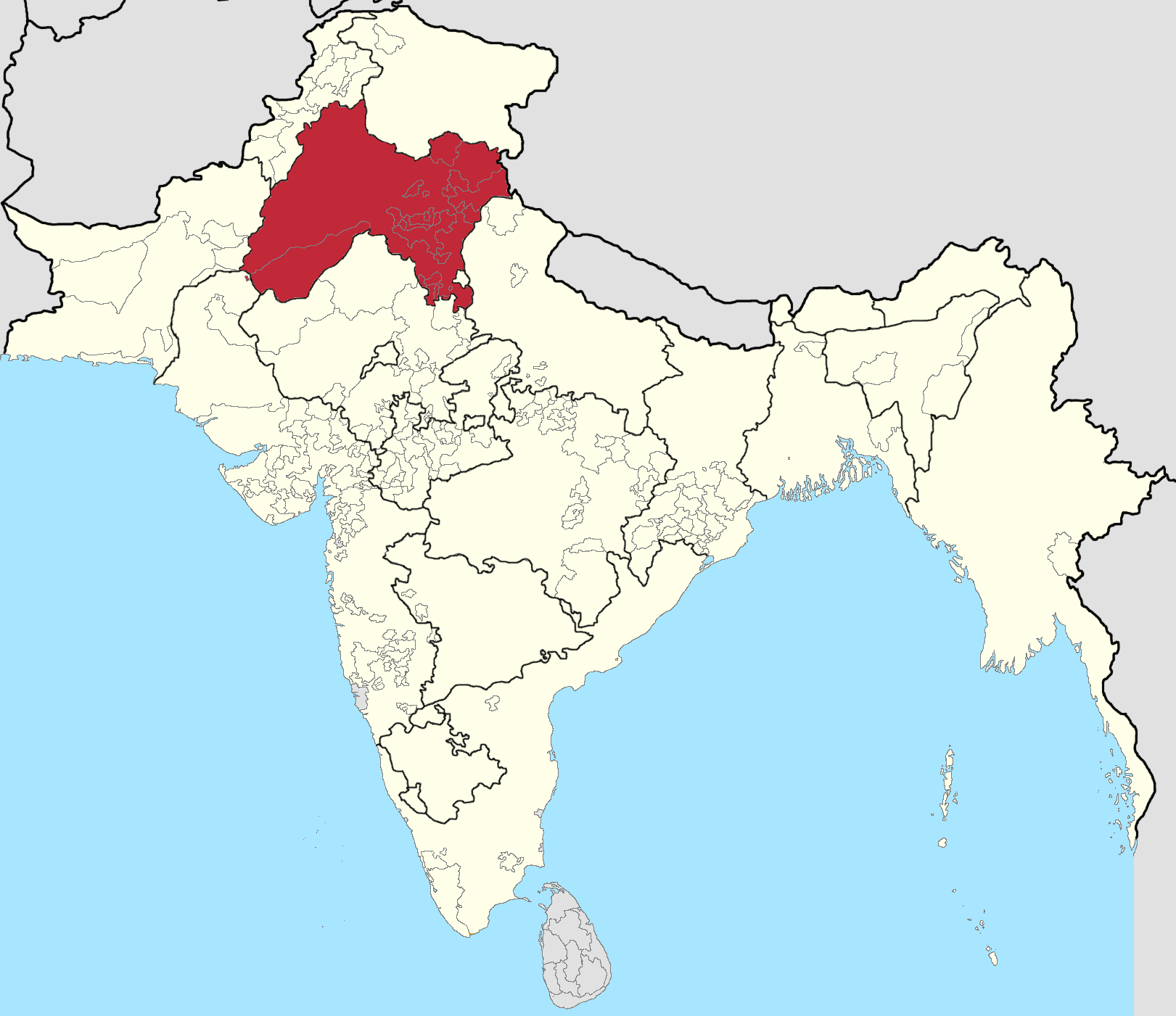
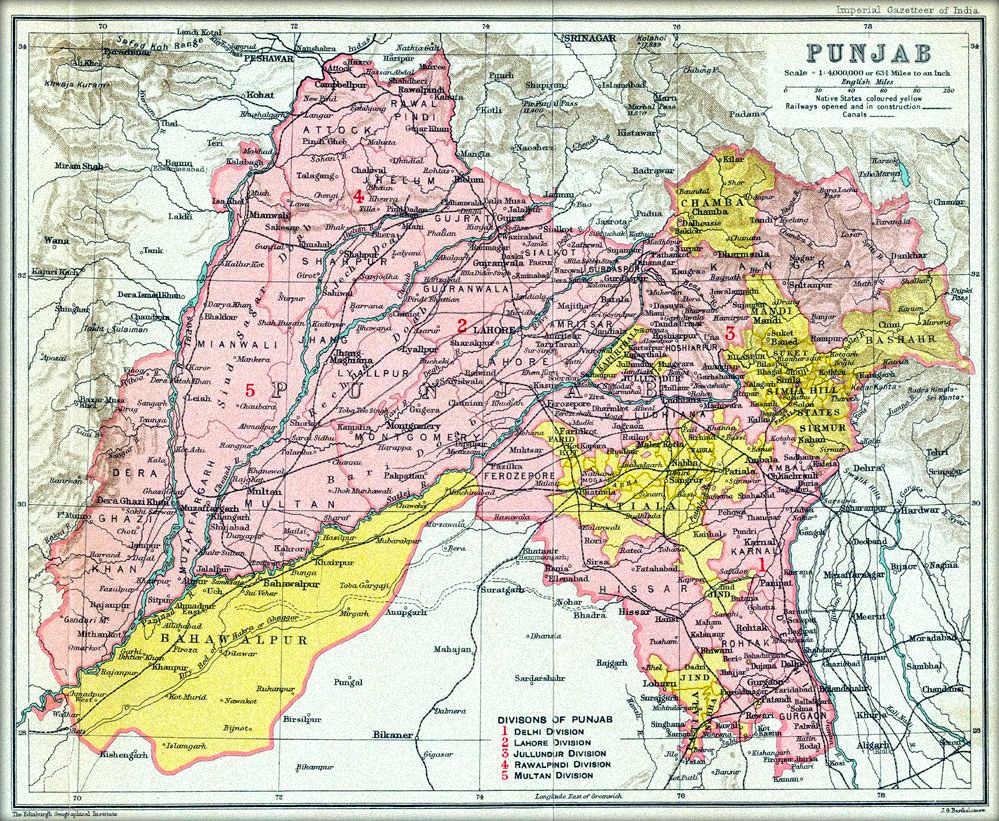
- Status: Board of Administration-led province under Bengal Presidency of East India Company (1849–1853); Chief Commissioner's Province of East India Company (1853–1858); Lieutenant Governor-led province of British Raj (1858–1921); Governor-led province of British Raj (1921–1947)
- Capitals: Lahore (winter); Murree (summer, 1873–1876); Simla (summer, 1876–1947)
- Official languages: English; Urdu; Persian (Note: English was used by the British administration; Urdu and Persian were used in local administration. In 1849, the Board of Administration of the Punjab adopted a "two-language policy" maintaining the already-established Persian in the province, as well as establishing Hindustani for official use. However, in 1854, Persian was discontinued as an official language in the province and was replaced with Urdu.)
- Native languages: Punjabi; Haryanvi; others
- Ethnic groups (1931): 76.4% Punjabi; 23.6% other
- Religion (1941): 53.2% Islam; 30.1% Hinduism; 14.9% Sikhism; 1.5% Christianity; 0.5% other
- Demonym: Punjabi
- Head of Province
  - 1849–1853: Henry Montgomery Lawrence (first) (Note: as President of the Board of Administration)
  - 1946–1947: Evan Meredith Jenkins (last) (Note: as Governor)
- Premier
  - 1937–1942: Sikandar Hayat Khan (first)
  - 1942–1947: Malik Khizar Hayat Tiwana (last)
- Legislature: Punjab Legislative Council (1921–1936); Punjab Provincial Assembly (1937–1947)
- Historical era: New Imperialism
  - Battle of Gujrat: 21 February 1849
  - Annexation of Punjab: 29 March 1849
  - Incorporation of Delhi Division: 1858
  - Separation of the North-West Frontier: 9 November 1901
  - Separation of Delhi District: 1911
  - Establishment of Pakistan and India: 14–15 August 1947
  - Partition of Punjab during the Partition of India: 17 August 1947

Area
  - Total: 458,354 km^{2} (176,971 sq mi)

Population
  - 1941 census: 34,309,861
- Currency: British Indian rupee
- Time zone: UTC+05:30
- Date format: dd-mm-yyyy
Preceded by
1849: Sikh Empire
1849: Cis-Sutlej states
1858: Delhi Division
Succeeded by
1901: North-West Frontier Province
1911: Delhi Province
1947: West Punjab
East Punjab
- Today part of: India; Punjab; Haryana; Himachal Pradesh; NCT of Delhi; Pakistan; Punjab; Islamabad CT; Khyber Pakhtunkhwa

The Punjab Province, officially the Province of Punjab, was a province of British Raj, with its capital in Lahore and summer capitals in Murree and Simla. At its greatest extent, it stretched from the Khyber Pass to Delhi; and from the Babusar Pass and the borders of Tibet to the borders of Sind. Established in 1849 following Punjab's annexation, the province was partitioned in 1947 into East and West Punjab; and incorporated into India and Pakistan, respectively.

Most of the Punjab region was annexed by the East India Company on 29 March 1849 following the company's victory against the Sikh Empire's army at the Battle of Gujrat in northern Punjab, a month prior. The Punjab was the last major region of the Indian subcontinent to fall to British imperialism.

Immediately following its annexation, the Punjab was annexed into the Bengal Presidency and administered separately by a board of administration led by the head of province. After 1853, the board was replaced by a chief commissioner as the Punjab was separated from the Bengal Presidency and established as a Chief Commissioner's Province. In 1858, the Punjab, along with the rest of British India, came under the rule of the British crown. Following the Indian Rebellion of 1857, the Punjab became a lieutenant-governor's province under the Bengal Presidency. After the Government of India Act 1919, Punjab was turned into a governor's province. It had a land area of 358,355 square kilometers.

The province comprised four natural geographic regions – Indo-Gangetic Plain West, Himalayan, Sub-Himalayan, and the North-West Dry Area – along with five administrative divisions – Delhi, Jullundur, Lahore, Multan, and Rawalpindi – and a number of princely states. In 1947, the Partition of India led to the province's division into East Punjab and West Punjab, in the newly independent dominions of the Indian Union and Pakistan respectively.

During the colonial-period, the appellation "province" was used somewhat indiscriminately but usually referred to lieutenant-governor provinces (which Punjab was after 1859) but also to chief-commissioner provinces (which Punjab was from 1853–1859).

== Etymology ==
The region was originally called the Sapta Sindhu Rivers, the Vedic land of the seven rivers, originally: Saraswati, Indus, Sutlej, Jhelum, Chenab, Ravi, and Beas. The Sanskrit name for the region, as mentioned in the Ramayana and Mahabharata, for example, was Pañcanada, which means literally "Five Waters", and was translated from Sanskrit to Farsi as Panj-Âb after the Islamic conquests. The later name Punjab is thus a compound of two Farsi words Panj (five) and āb (water) and was introduced to the region by the Turko-Persian conquerors of India and more formally popularised during the Mughal Empire. Punjab literally means "(The Land of) Five Waters" referring to the rivers: Jhelum, Chenab, Ravi, Sutlej, and Beas. All are tributaries of the Indus River, the Chenab being the largest.

== Geography ==
Geographically, the province was a triangular tract of country of which the Indus River and its tributary the Sutlej formed the two sides up to their confluence, the base of the triangle in the north being the Lower Himalayan Range between those two rivers. Moreover, the province as constituted under British rule also included a large tract outside these boundaries. Along the northern border, Himalayan ranges divided it from Kashmir and Tibet. On the west it was separated from the North-West Frontier Province by the Indus, until it reached the border of Dera Ghazi Khan District, which was divided from Baluchistan by the Sulaiman Range. To the south lay Sindh and Rajputana, while on the east the rivers Jumna and Tons separated it from the United Provinces. In total Punjab had an area of approximately 357 000 km square about the same size as modern day Germany, being one of the largest provinces of the British Raj.

It encompassed the present day Indian states of Punjab, Haryana, Chandigarh, Delhi, and some parts of Himachal Pradesh which were merged with Punjab by the British for administrative purposes (but excluding the former princely states which were later combined into the Patiala and East Punjab States Union) and the Pakistani regions of the Punjab, Islamabad Capital Territory and Khyber Pakhtunkhwa.

In 1901 the frontier districts beyond the Indus were separated from Punjab and made into a new province: the North-West Frontier Province. Subsequently, Punjab was divided into four natural geographical divisions by colonial officials on the decadal census data:

1. Indo-Gangetic Plain West geographical division (including Hisar district, Loharu State, Rohtak district, Dujana State, Gurgaon district, Pataudi State, Delhi, Karnal district, Jalandhar district, Kapurthala State, Ludhiana district, Malerkotla State, Firozpur district, Faridkot State, Patiala State, Jind State, Nabha State, Lahore District, Amritsar district, Gujranwala District, and Sheikhupura District);
2. Himalayan geographical division (including Sirmoor State, Simla District, Simla Hill States, Bilaspur State, Kangra district, Mandi State, Suket State, and Chamba State);
3. Sub-Himalayan geographical division (including Ambala district, Kalsia State, Hoshiarpur district, Gurdaspur District, Sialkot District, Gujrat District, Jhelum District, Rawalpindi District, and Attock District;
4. North-West Dry Area geographical division (including Montgomery District, Shahpur District, Mianwali District, Lyallpur District, Jhang District, Multan District, Bahawalpur State, Muzaffargarh District, Dera Ghazi Khan District, and the Biloch Trans–Frontier Tract).

== Administrative divisions ==
Punjab (British India): British Territory and Princely States in 1855
Division	Districts
Cis-Sutlej Division	Ambala • Ludhiana • Firozpur • Thanesar • Shimla
Trans-Sutlej Division	Kangra • Hoshiarpur • Jalandhar
Lahore Division	Lahore • Amritsar • Sialkot • Gujranwala • Gurdaspur
Jhelum Division	Rawalpindi • Shahpur • Jhelum • Gujrat
Multan Division	Multan • Gogera • Jhang
Leia Division	Layyah • Khangarh • Dera Ismail Khan • Dera Ghazi Khan
Peshwar Division	Peshawar • Hazara • Kohat
Total British Territory	81,625.24 square miles & 12,717,821 persons
Cis-Satluj Principlites	Patiala • Nabha • Faridkot • Jind • Malerkotla • Kalsia
Simla-Hill states	Hill states (south of Sutlej River)
Trans-Sutlej Principlites	Kapurthala • Hill states between Beas & Ravi River)
Bahawalpur	Bahawalpur
Kashmir & Jammu	Gulab singh Territories
Total Native States	102,884.95 square miles & 6,750,606 persons
Total Punjab Province	184,510.19 square miles & 19,468,627 persons

Punjab (British India): British Territory and Princely States in 1901
Division	Districts in British Territory / Princely States
Rawalpindi Division	Attock; Jhelum; Rawalpindi; Shahpur
Lahore Division	Amritsar; Gujrat; Gujranwala; Gurdaspur; Lahore; Sialkot
Multan Division	Dera Ghazi Khan; Jhang; Mianwali; Multan; Muzaffargarh
Jullundur Division	Ferozepore; Hoshiarpur; Jullundur; Kangra; Ludhiana
Delhi Division	Ambala; Delhi; Gurgaon; Hissar; Karnal; Rohtak; Simla
Total British Territory	97,209 square miles
Native States	Patiala; Jind; Nabha; Bahawalpur; Sirmur; Loharu; Dujana; Pataudi; Kalsia; Simla Hill States; Kapurthala; Mandi; Malerkotla; Suket; Faridkot; Siba; Chamba; Kahlur (Bilaspur)
Total Native States	36,532 square miles
Total Punjab Province	133,741 square miles

=== Maps of administrative divisions ===
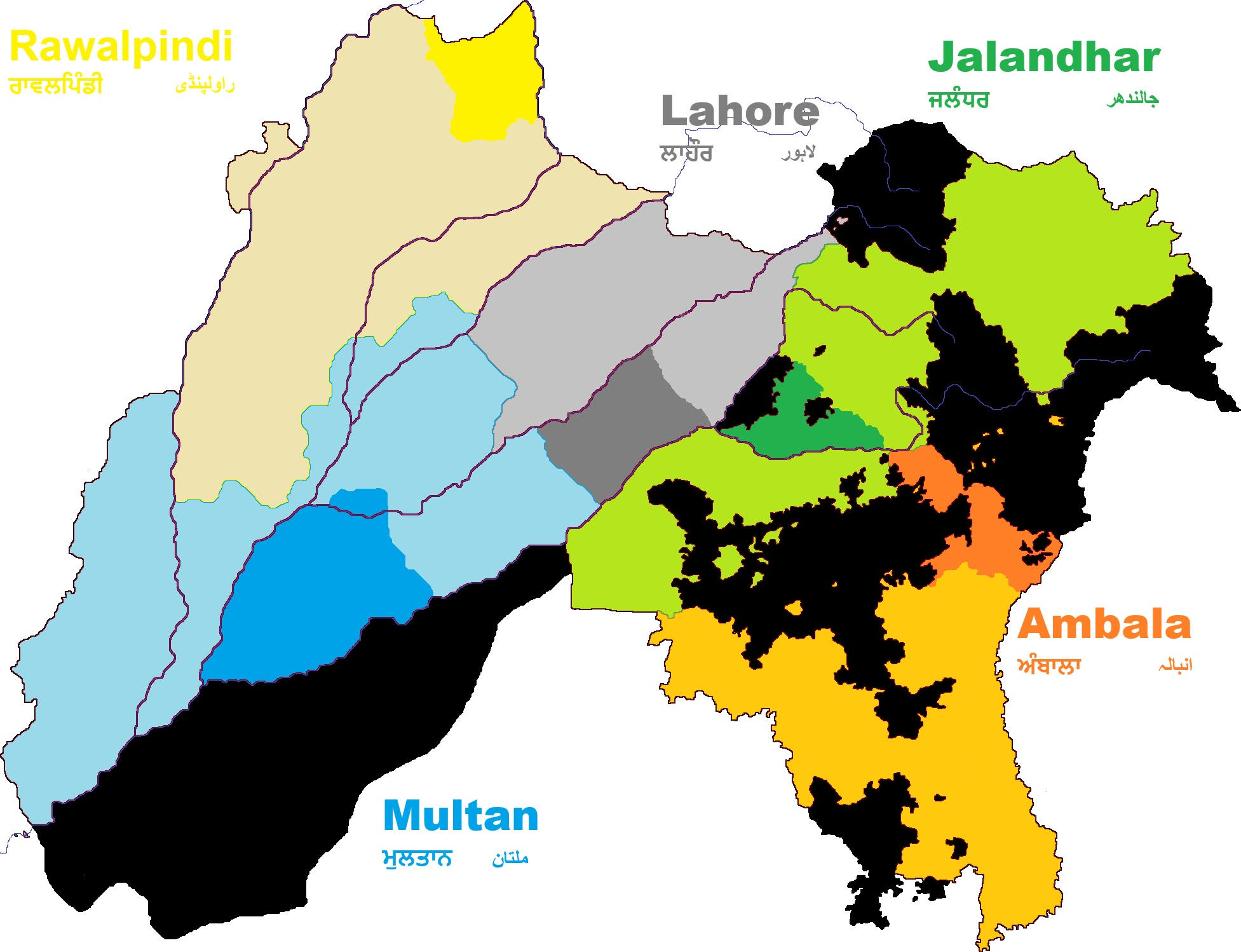
Map of the divisions of British Punjab (with the namesake district of each division shaded darker and princely-states shaded black), 1947

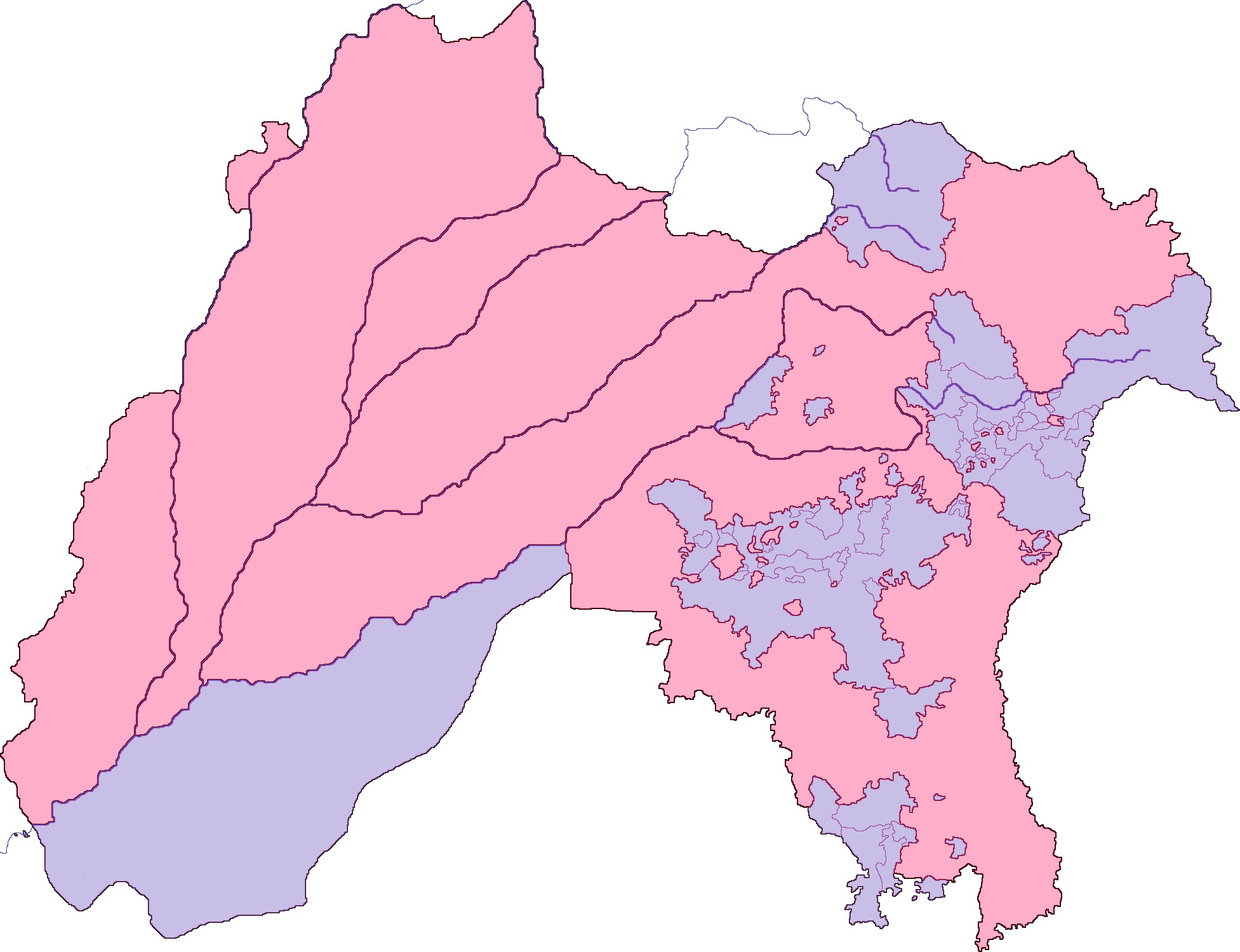
Map of Punjab in 1947, with princely-state territory in purple & direct British-rule in pink.

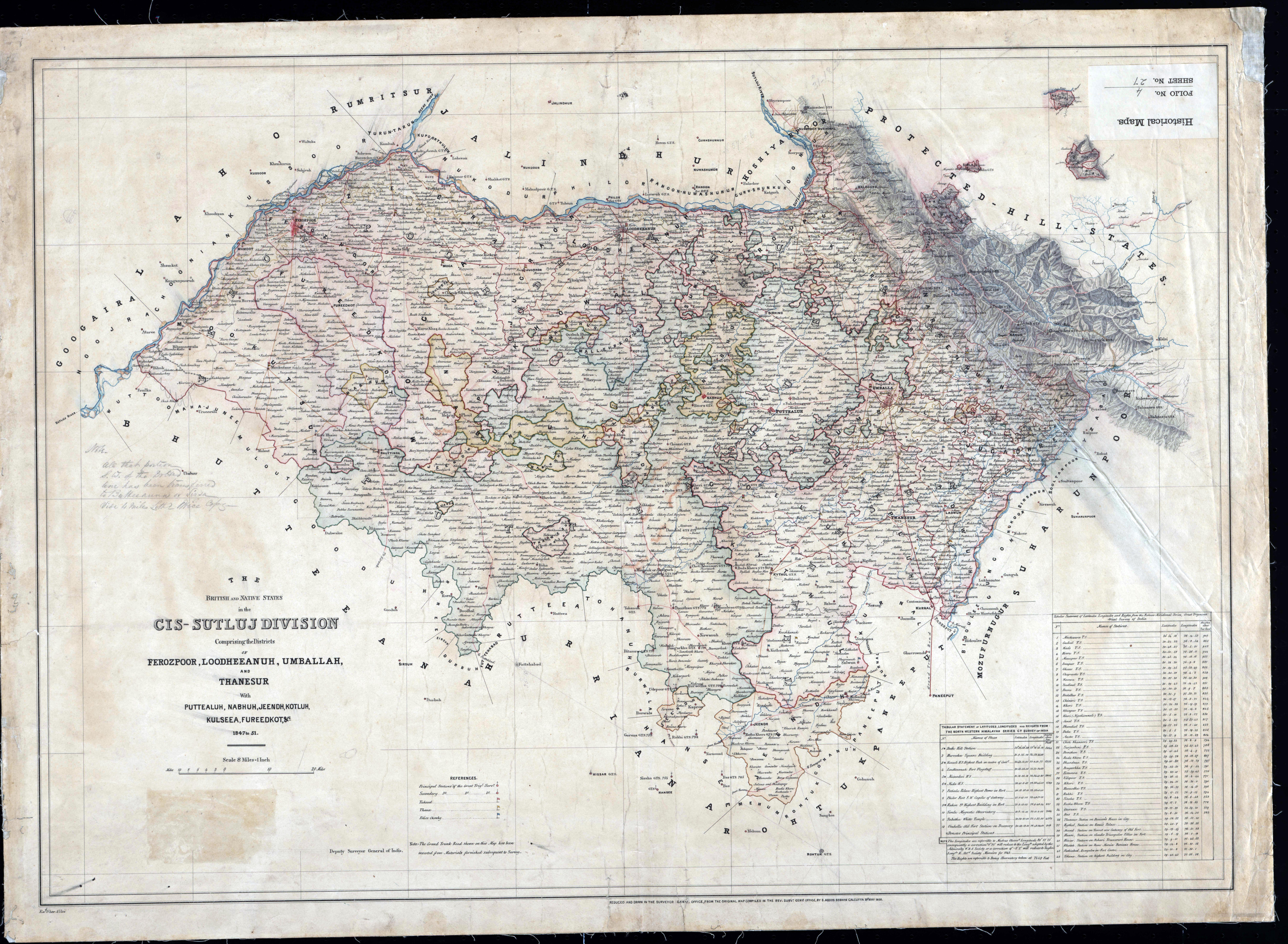
1847–1851:- Punjab Province's Cis-Sutlej Division and Principlites

1853:- Map showing Punjab provinces and adjoining area

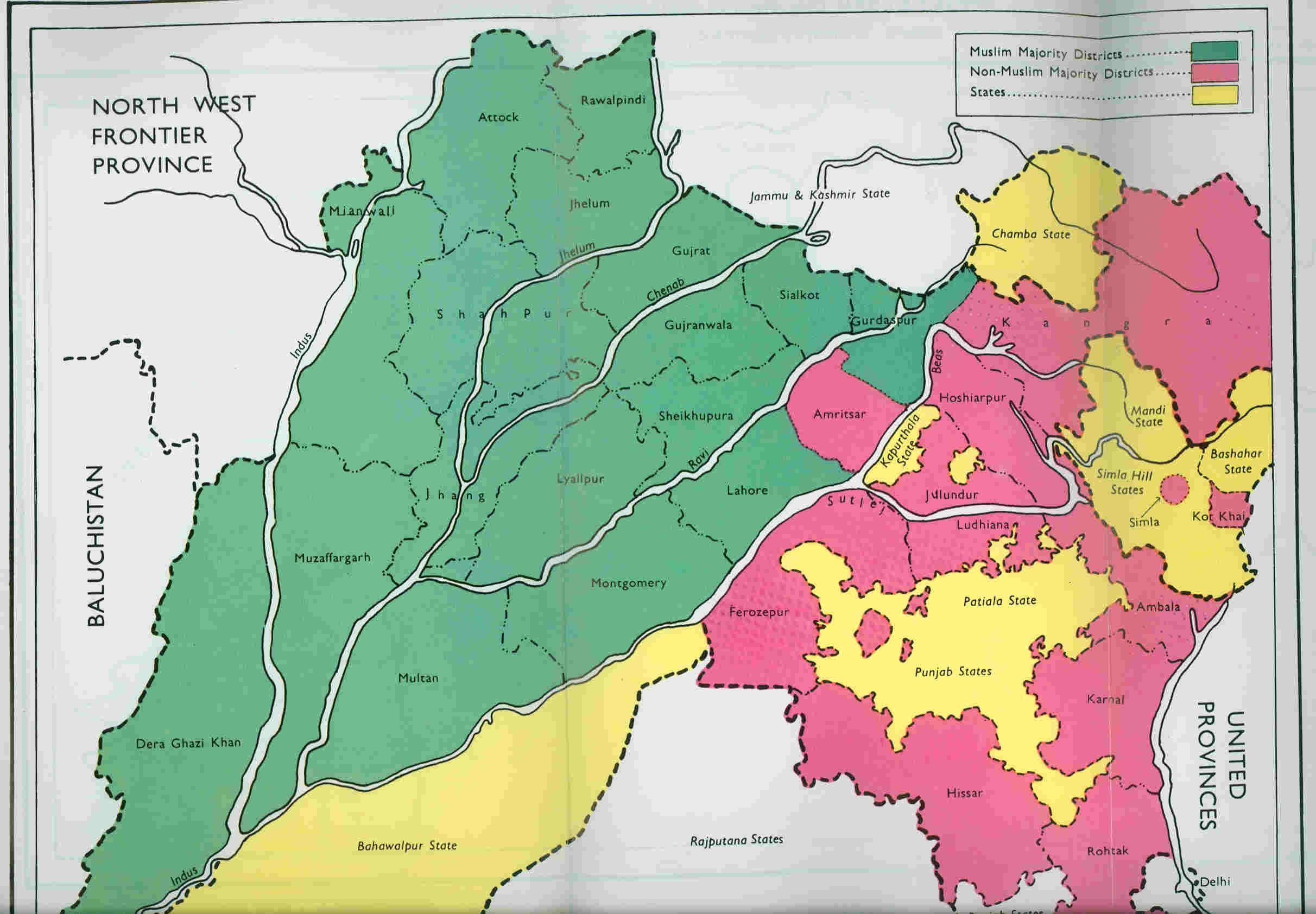
Districts of Punjab with Muslim (green) and non-Muslim (pink) majorities, as per 1941 census

== History ==
=== Company rule ===
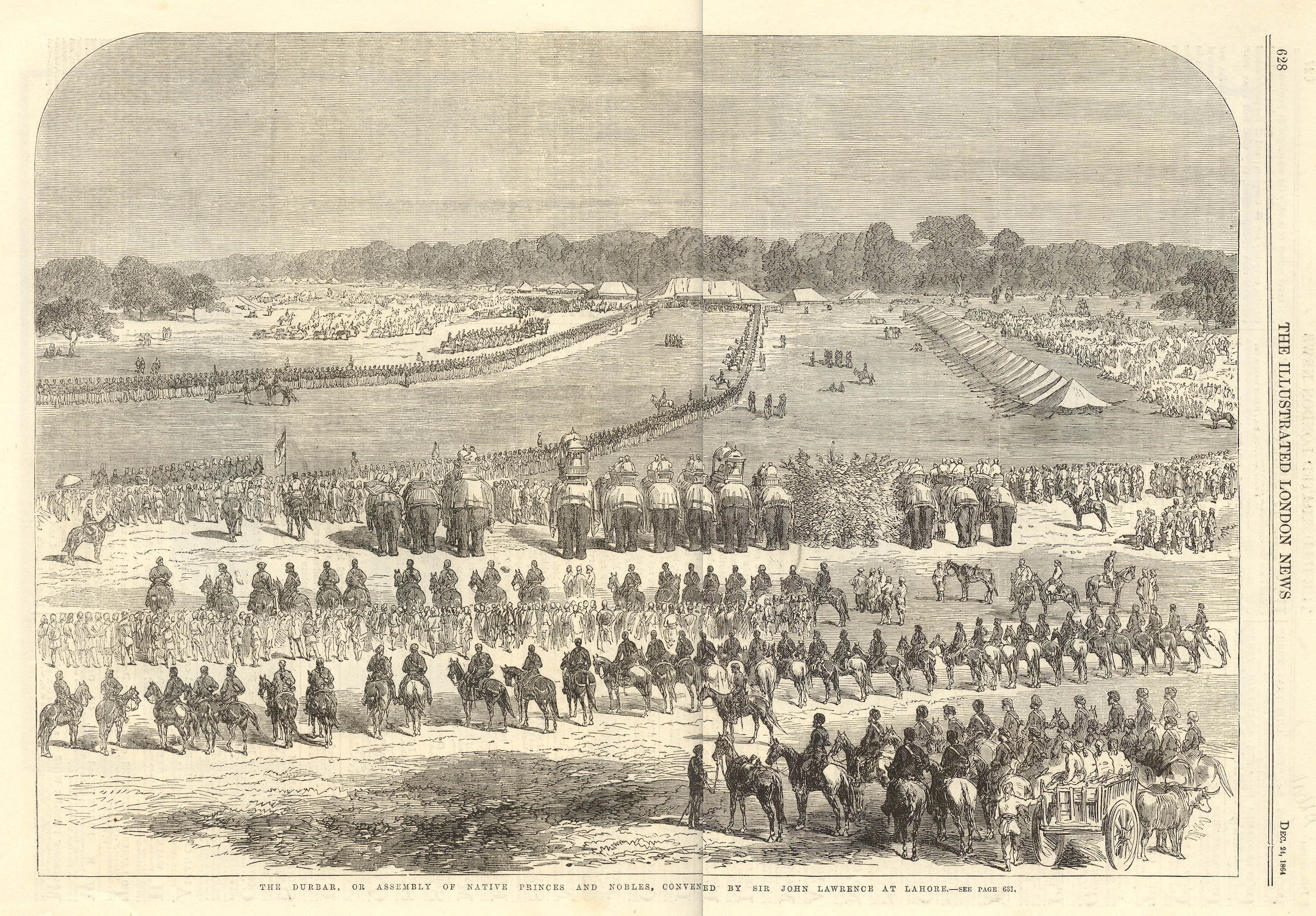
"The Durbar, or Assembly of Native Princes and Nobles, convened by Sir John Lawrence at Lahore", illustration for The Illustrated London News, 24 December 1864

Delhi and the areas of Gurgaon, Hisar, and Karnal districts were conquered by the British in 1803. On 30 December 1803, the Daulat Scindia signed the Treaty of Surji-Anjangaon with the British after the Battle of Assaye and Battle of Laswari and ceded to the British, Hisar, Panipat, Rohtak, Rewari, Gurgaon, Ganges-Jumna Doab, the Delhi-Agra region, parts of Bundelkhand, Broach, some districts of Gujarat and the fort of Ahmmadnagar. The area of Shimla district was obtained by the British in 1815.

After the conclusion of the First Anglo-Sikh War of 1845–46, the areas of the following districts were annexed by the British: Ambala, Firozpur, Hoshiarpur, Jalandhar, Kangra, and Ludhiana districts. After the Second Anglo-Sikh War of 1848–49, the areas of the following districts were annexed by the Britishers: Amritsar, Gurdaspur, Bannu, Dera Ghazi Khan, Dera Ismail Khan, Gujranwala, Gujrat, Hazara, Jhang, Jhelum, Kohat, Lahore, Montgomerty, Multan, Muzaffargarh, Peshawar, Rawalpindi, Shahpur, and Sialkot districts.

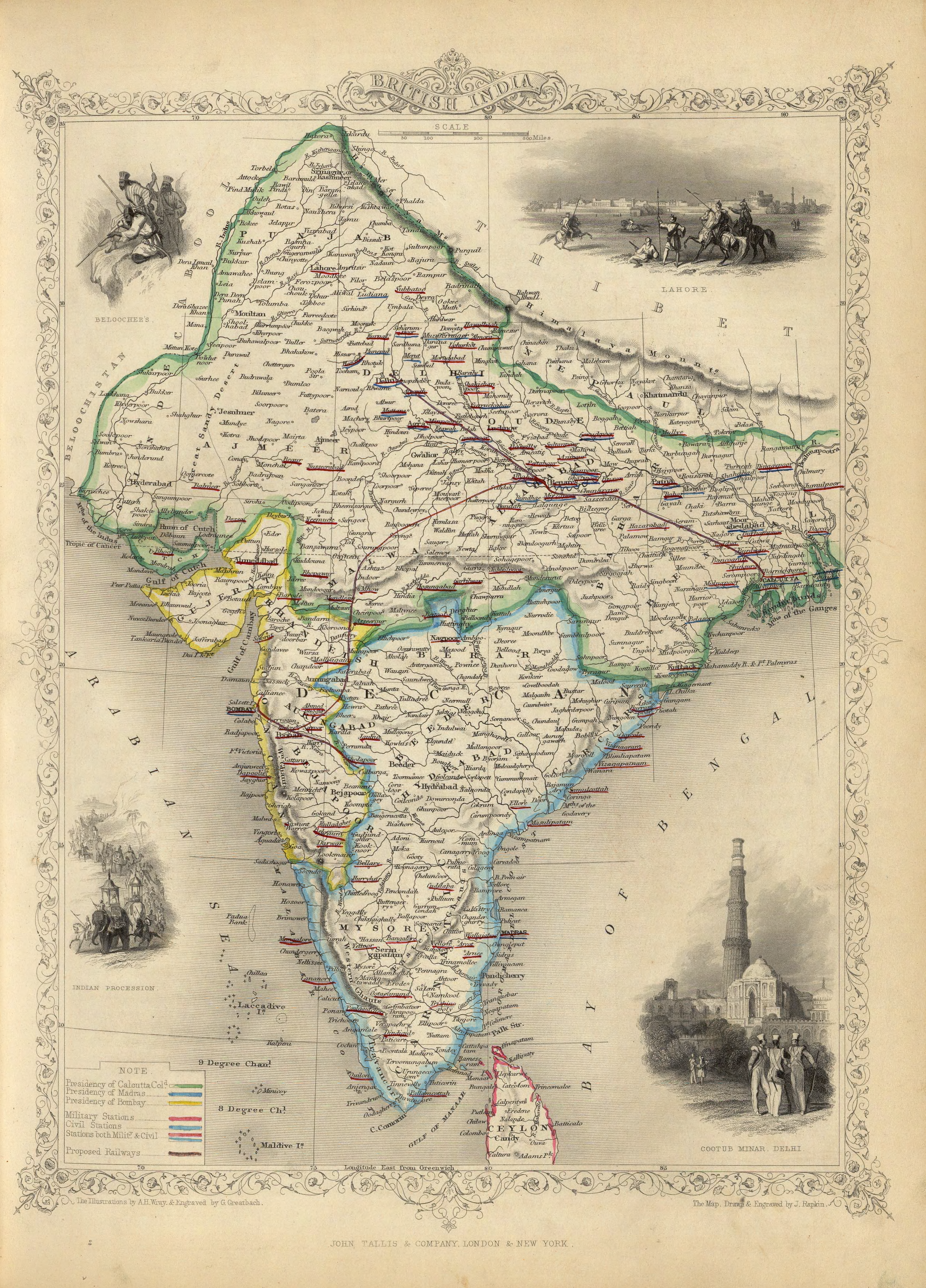
Map of British India, showing principal administrative divisions, London & New York, 1851. The recently conquered Punjabi territory was initially administered as part of the Bengal Presidency for a few years following annexation.

On 21 February 1849, the East India Company decisively defeated the Sikh Empire at the Battle of Gujrat bringing to an end the Second Anglo-Sikh War, with the Sikh Army surrendering near Rawalpindi on 14 March 1849. Following the victory, the East India Company announced the annexation of the conquered territory through a durbar proclamation on 30 March 1849 and annexed the Punjab on 2 April 1849 and incorporated it within British India. The deposed child-monarch Duleep Singh was given a pension and forced to live outside Punjab, with all his possessions, including the Koh-i-Noor diamond, being given to the British. Duleep eventually moved to Britain. The British divided the newly conquered territory into divisions and introduced institutions such as the Railways, Irrigation and Public Works Department.

After annexation of Punjab, a three-man board of administration was established to govern the newly conquered territory. For the task of organization of the conquered region, Henry Lawrence was the prime candidate to take up the task, yet Dalhousie did not agree with Lawrence's views fully. Thus, the compromise was the establishment of a three-member board of government/administration to administer the new territory. The province whilst nominally under the control of the Bengal Presidency was administratively independent. Lord Dalhousie constituted the Board of Administration by inducting into it the most experienced and seasoned British officers. The Board was led by Sir Henry Lawrence, who had previously worked as British Resident at the Lahore Durbar and also consisted of his younger brother John Lawrence and Charles Grenville Mansel. Below the Board, a group of acclaimed officers collectively known as Henry Lawrence's "Young Men" assisted in the administration of the newly acquired province. The Board was abolished by Lord Dalhousie in 1853 being replaced with a Chief Commissioner. Sir Henry was assigned to the Rajputana Agency, and his brother John Lawrence succeeded as the first Chief Commissioner. Thus, Punjab became administered by a chief commissioner.

Recognising the cultural diversity of the Punjab, the Board maintained a strict policy of non-interference in regard to religious and cultural matters. Sikh aristocrats were given patronage and pensions and groups in control of historical places of worship were allowed to remain in control.

During the Indian Rebellion of 1857, the Punjab remained relatively peaceful, apart from rebellion led by Ahmad Khan Kharral. In May, John Lawrence took swift action to disarm potentially mutinous sepoys and redeploy most European troops to the Delhi ridge. Finally he recruited new regiments of Punjabis to replace the depleted force, and was provided with manpower and support from surrounding princely states such as Jind, Patiala, Nabha and Kapurthala and tribal chiefs on the borderlands with Afghanistan. By 1858, an estimated 70,000 extra men had been recruited for the army and militarised police from within the Punjab.

=== British Raj ===
The Punjab in 1880

Following the Indian mutiny, Punjab became a lieutenant-governor's province in 1858, still under the Bengal Presidency. The governor-general of India, the highest seat of local authority, ruled the Bengal Presidency through its lieutenant-governors and chief-commissioners. Both the lieutenant-governors and chief-commissioners presided over commissioners of divisions, with those commissioners having authority over deputy-commissioners of districts.

In 1858, under the terms of the Queen's Proclamation issued by Queen Victoria, the Punjab, along with the rest of British India, came under the direct rule of the British Crown. The East India Company was abolished, along with its court of directors, replacing that administrative set-up with the council of India. Delhi Territory was transferred from the North-Western Provinces to the Punjab in 1858, partly to punish the city for the important role the last Mughal emperor, Bahadur Shah II, and the city as a whole, played in the 1857 Rebellion.

In 1859, Punjab became a lieutenant-governor's province. Sir John Lawrence, then Chief Commissioner, was appointed the first Lieutenant-Governor on 1 January 1859. In 1866, the Judicial Commissioner was replaced by a Chief Court. The direct administrative functions of the Government were carried by the Lieutenant-Governor through the Secretariat, comprising a Chief Secretary, a Secretary and two Under-Secretaries. They were usually members of the Indian Civil Service. The territory under the Lieutenant consisted of 29 Districts, grouped under 5 Divisions, and 43 Princely States. Each District was under a Deputy-Commissioner, who reported to the Commissioner of the Division. Each District was subdivided into between three and seven tehsils, each under a tahsildar, assisted by a naib (deputy) tahsildar.

In 1885 the Punjab administration began an ambitious plan to transform over six million acres of barren waste land in central and western Punjab into irrigable agricultural land. The creation of canal colonies was designed to relieve demographic pressures in the central parts of the province, increase productivity and revenues, and create a loyal support amongst peasant landholders. The colonisation resulted in an agricultural revolution in the province, rapid industrial growth, and the resettlement of over one million Punjabis in the new areas. A number of towns were created or saw significant development in the colonies, such as Lyallpur, Sargodha and Montgomery. Colonisation led to the canal irrigated area of the Punjab increasing from three to fourteen million acres in the period from 1885 to 1947.

The beginning of the twentieth century saw increasing unrest in the Punjab. Conditions in the Chenab colony, together with land reforms such as the Punjab Land Alienation Act, 1900 and the Colonisation Bill, 1906 contributed to the 1907 Punjab unrest. The unrest was unlike any previous agitation in the province as the government had for the first time aggrieved a large portion of the rural population. Mass demonstrations were organised, headed by Lala Lajpat Rai, a leader of the Hindu revivalist sect Arya Samaj. The unrest resulted in the repeal of the Colonisation Bill and the end of paternalist policies in the colonies.

During the First World War, Punjabi manpower contributed heavily to the Indian Army. Out of a total of 683,149 combat troops, 349,688 hailed from the province. In 1918, an influenza epidemic broke out in the province, resulting in the deaths of an estimated 962,937 people or 4.77 percent of the total estimated population.

The Indian independence movement was active in Punjab, consisting of the Swadeshi and Ghadar (est. 1913) movements. In 1907, railway and arsenal workers and engineers organized a strike in Rawalpindi in support of the Swadeshi movement. Some notable figures of the local manifestation of the independence movement include Lala Lajpat Rai, Ajit Singh, Saifuddin Kitchlew, Gokul Chand Narang, and Satya Pal. To symbolize Hindu-Muslim-Sikh unity under the Rowlatt Satyagraha, Saifuddin Kitchlew received the keys to the Golden Temple complex of the Sikhs in Amritsar from the British administrators. Various speeches by nationalists were held in Amritsar, Gujranwala, Gurdaspur, Firozpur, Jalandhar, and Lahore from February to April 1919. In March 1919 the Rowlatt Act was passed extending emergency measures of detention and incarceration in response to the perceived threat of terrorism from revolutionary nationalist organisations. This led to the infamous Jallianwala Bagh massacre in April 1919, where Colonel Reginald Edward Harry Dyer ordered detachments of the 9th Gorkha Rifles and the 59th Scinde Rifles under his command to fire into a group of some 10,000 unarmed protesters and Baisakhi pilgrims, killing 379. The massacre strengthened the independence movement.

=== Administrative reforms ===
The Montagu–Chelmsford Reforms enacted through the Government of India Act 1919 expanded the Punjab Legislative Council and introduced the principle of dyarchy, whereby certain responsibilities such as agriculture, health, education, and local government, were transferred to elected ministers. The first Punjab Legislative Council under the 1919 Act was constituted in 1921, comprising 93 members, seventy per cent to be elected and rest to be nominated. Some of the British Indian ministers under the dyarchy scheme were Sir Sheikh Abdul Qadir, Sir Shahab-ud-Din Virk and Lala Hari Kishen Lal.

The Government of India Act 1935 introduced provincial autonomy to Punjab replacing the system of dyarchy. It provided for the constitution of Punjab Legislative Assembly of 175 members presided by a Speaker and an executive government responsible to the Assembly. The Unionist Party under Sir Sikandar Hayat Khan formed the government in 1937. Sir Sikandar was succeeded by Malik Khizar Hayat Tiwana in 1942 who remained the Premier till partition in 1947. Although the term of the Assembly was five years, the Assembly continued for about eight years and its last sitting was held on 19 March 1945.

=== Partition ===
The struggle for Indian independence witnessed competing and conflicting interests in the Punjab. The landed elites of the Muslim, Hindu and Sikh communities had loyally collaborated with the British since annexation, supported the Unionist Party and were hostile to the Congress party led independence movement. Amongst the peasantry and urban middle classes, the Hindus were the most active National Congress supporters, the Sikhs flocked to the Akali movement whilst the Muslims eventually supported the All-India Muslim League.

Since the partition of the sub-continent had been decided, special meetings of the Western and Eastern Section of the Legislative Assembly were held on 23 June 1947 to decide whether or not the Province of the Punjab be partitioned. After voting on both sides, partition was decided and the existing Punjab Legislative Assembly was also divided into West Punjab Legislative Assembly and the East Punjab Legislative Assembly. This last Assembly before independence, held its last sitting on 4 July 1947.

== Population ==
Population history
Year	Pop.	±%
1855	17,600,000	—
1868	19,700,000	+11.9%
1881	20,800,995	+5.6%
1891	22,915,894	+10.2%
1901	24,367,113	+6.3%
1911	23,791,841	−2.4%
1921	25,101,514	+5.5%
1931	28,490,869	+13.5%
1941	34,309,861	+20.4%
Source: Census of India

The first British census of the Punjab was carried out in 1855. This covered only British territory to the exclusion of local princely states, and placed the population at 17.6 million. The first regular census of British India carried out in 1881 recorded a population of 20.8 million people. The final British census in 1941 recorded 34.3 million people in the Punjab, which comprised 29 districts within British territory, 43 princely states, 52,047 villages and 283 towns.

In 1881, only Amritsar and Lahore had populations over 100,000. The commercial and industrial city of Amritsar (152,000) was slightly larger than the cultural capital of Lahore (149,000). Over the following sixty years, Lahore increased in population fourfold, whilst Amritsar grew two-fold. By 1941, the province had seven cities with populations over 100,000 with emergence and growth of Rawalpindi, Multan, Sialkot, Jullundur and Ludhiana.

The colonial period saw large scale migration within the Punjab due to the creation of canal colonies in western Punjab. The majority of colonists hailed from the seven most densely populated districts of Amritsar, Gurdaspur, Jullundur, Hoshiarpur, Ludhiana, Ambala and Sialkot, and consisted primarily of Khatris, Brahmins, Jats, Arains, Sainis, Kambohs and Rajputs. The movement of many highly skilled farmers from eastern and central Punjab to the new colonies, led to western Punjab becoming the most progressive and advanced agricultural region of the province.

The period also saw significant numbers of Punjabis emigrate to other regions of the British Empire. The main destinations were East Africa - Kenya, Uganda and Tanzania, Southeast Asia - Malaya and Burma, Hong Kong and Canada.

== Religion ==
The Punjab was a religiously eclectic province, comprising three major groups: Muslims, Hindus and Sikhs. By 1941, the religious Muslims constituting an absolute majority at 53.2%, whilst the Hindu population was at 30.1%. (Note: 1931 & 1941 censuses: Including Ad-Dharmis) The period between 1881 and 1941 saw a significant increase in the Sikh and Christian populations, growing from 8.2% and 0.1% to 14.9% and 1.9% respectively. The decrease in the Hindu population has been attributed to the conversion of Hindus mainly to Sikhism and Islam, and also to Christianity.

In 1941, the Hindus, Muslims and Sikhs made 30.1, 53.2 and 14.9 per cent of the total population of Punjab but made 37.9, 51.4 and 8.4 per cent of its urban population respectively.

Religious groups in Punjab Province (1881–1941)
Religious group	1881 (Note: Including Delhi district, which was later made into a separate province in 1912, following the transfer from Calcutta to Delhi as capital of India in 1911.) (Note: Population figure excludes subdivisions that would ultimately form part of North-West Frontier Province following bifurcation of Punjab Province in 1901.)		1891		1901		1911		1921		1931		1941	
Religious group	Pop.	%	Pop.	%	Pop.	%	Pop.	%	Pop.	%	Pop.	%	Pop.	%
Islam	9,872,745	47.58%	10,827,628	47.39%	12,183,345	49.22%	12,275,477	50.75%	12,813,383	51.05%	14,929,896	52.4%	18,259,744	53.22%
Hinduism	9,095,175	43.84%	10,070,716	44.08%	10,344,469	41.79%	8,773,621	36.27%	8,799,651	35.06%	9,018,509	31.65%	10,336,549	30.13%
Sikhism	1,706,165	8.22%	1,849,371	8.09%	2,102,896	8.49%	2,883,729	11.92%	3,107,296	12.38%	4,071,624	14.29%	5,116,185	14.91%
Jainism	42,572	0.21%	45,575	0.2%	49,983	0.2%	46,775	0.19%	41,321	0.16%	43,140	0.15%	45,475	0.13%
Christianity	28,054	0.14%	48,472	0.21%	66,591	0.27%	199,751	0.83%	332,939	1.33%	419,353	1.47%	512,466	1.49%
Buddhism	3,251	0.02%	6,236	0.03%	6,940	0.03%	7,690	0.03%	5,912	0.02%	7,753	0.03%	854	0.002%
Zoroastrianism	413	0.002%	364	0.002%	477	0.002%	653	0.003%	526	0.002%	569	0.002%	4,359	0.01%
Judaism	—N/a	—N/a	29	0.0001%	24	0.0001%	54	0.0002%	19	0.0001%	13	0%	39	0.0001%
Others	57	0.0003%	28	0.0001%	12	0%	0	0%	13	0.0001%	0	0%	34,190	0.1%
Total population	20,748,432	100%	22,848,419	100%	24,754,737	100%	24,187,750	100%	25,101,060	100%	28,490,857	100%	34,309,861	100%
Territory comprises the contemporary subdivisions of Punjab, India, Chandigarh Union Territory, Haryana, Himachal Pradesh, National Capital Territory of Delhi (until 1911), Punjab, Pakistan, and Islamabad Capital Territory.

Religion in West Punjab (1881–1941)
Religious group	1881 (Note: 1881 figure taken from census data by combining the total population of all districts (Lahore, Sialkot, Gujranwala, Gujrat, Shahpur, Jhelum, Rawalpindi, Montgomery, Jhang, Multan, Muzaffargargh, Dera Ghazi Khan), one tehsil (Shakargarh – then part of Gurdaspur District), and one princely state (Bahawalpur) in Punjab Province, British India that ultimately fell on the western side of the Radcliffe Line. See 1881 census data here: Immediately following the partition of India in 1947, these districts and tract would ultimately make up the subdivision of West Punjab, which also later included Bahawalpur. The state that makes up this region in the contemporary era is Punjab, Pakistan.)		1891 (Note: 1891 figure taken from census data by combining the total population of all districts (Lahore, Sialkot, Gujranwala, Gujrat, Shahpur, Jhelum, Rawalpindi, Montgomery, Jhang, Multan, Muzaffargargh, Dera Ghazi Khan), one tehsil (Shakargarh – then part of Gurdaspur District), one princely state (Bahawalpur), and one tract (Biloch Trans–Frontier) in Punjab Province, British India that ultimately fell on the western side of the Radcliffe Line. See 1891 census data here: Immediately following the partition of India in 1947, these districts and tract would ultimately make up the subdivision of West Punjab, which also later included Bahawalpur. The state that makes up this region in the contemporary era is Punjab, Pakistan.)		1901 (Note: 1901 figure taken from census data by combining the total population of all districts (Lahore, Sialkot, Gujranwala, Gujrat, Shahpur, Jhelum, Rawalpindi, Mianwali, Montgomery, Lyallpur (inscribed as the Chenab Colony on the 1901 census), Jhang, Multan, Muzaffargargh, Dera Ghazi Khan), one tehsil (Shakargarh – then part of Gurdaspur District), one princely state (Bahawalpur), and one tract (Biloch Trans–Frontier) in Punjab Province, British India that ultimately fell on the western side of the Radcliffe Line. See 1901 census data here: Immediately following the partition of India in 1947, these districts and tract would ultimately make up the subdivision of West Punjab, which also later included Bahawalpur. The state that makes up this region in the contemporary era is Punjab, Pakistan.)		1911 (Note: 1911 figure taken from census data by combining the total population of all districts (Lahore, Sialkot, Gujranwala, Gujrat, Shahpur, Jhelum, Rawalpindi, Attock, Mianwali, Montgomery, Lyallpur, Jhang, Multan, Muzaffargargh, Dera Ghazi Khan), one tehsil (Shakargarh – then part of Gurdaspur District), one princely state (Bahawalpur), and one tract (Biloch Trans–Frontier) in Punjab Province, British India that ultimately fell on the western side of the Radcliffe Line. See 1911 census data here: Immediately following the partition of India in 1947, these districts and tract would ultimately make up the subdivision of West Punjab, which also later included Bahawalpur. The state that makes up this region in the contemporary era is Punjab, Pakistan.)		1921 (Note: 1921 figure taken from census data by combining the total population of all districts (Lahore, Sialkot, Gujranwala, Sheikhupura, Gujrat, Shahpur, Jhelum, Rawalpindi, Attock, Mianwali, Montgomery, Lyallpur, Jhang, Multan, Muzaffargargh, Dera Ghazi Khan), one tehsil (Shakargarh – then part of Gurdaspur District), one princely state (Bahawalpur), and one tract (Biloch Trans–Frontier) in Punjab Province, British India that ultimately fell on the western side of the Radcliffe Line. See 1921 census data here: Immediately following the partition of India in 1947, these districts and tract would ultimately make up the subdivision of West Punjab, which also later included Bahawalpur. The state that makes up this region in the contemporary era is Punjab, Pakistan.)		1931 (Note: 1931 figure taken from census data by combining the total population of all districts (Lahore, Sialkot, Gujranwala, Sheikhupura, Gujrat, Shahpur, Jhelum, Rawalpindi, Attock, Mianwali, Montgomery, Lyallpur, Jhang, Multan, Muzaffargargh, Dera Ghazi Khan), one tehsil (Shakargarh – then part of Gurdaspur District), one princely state (Bahawalpur), and one tract (Biloch Trans–Frontier) in Punjab Province, British India that ultimately fell on the western side of the Radcliffe Line. See 1931 census data here: Immediately following the partition of India in 1947, these districts and tract would ultimately make up the subdivision of West Punjab, which also later included Bahawalpur. The state that makes up this region in the contemporary era is Punjab, Pakistan.)		1941 (Note: 1941 figure taken from census data by combining the total population of all districts (Lahore, Sialkot, Gujranwala, Sheikhupura, Gujrat, Shahpur, Jhelum, Rawalpindi, Attock, Mianwali, Montgomery, Lyallpur, Jhang, Multan, Muzaffargargh, Dera Ghazi Khan), one tehsil (Shakargarh – then part of Gurdaspur District), one princely state (Bahawalpur), and one tract (Biloch Trans–Frontier) in Punjab Province, British India that ultimately fell on the western side of the Radcliffe Line. See 1941 census data here: Immediately following the partition of India in 1947, these districts and tract would ultimately make up the subdivision of West Punjab, which also later included Bahawalpur. The state that makes up this region in the contemporary era is Punjab, Pakistan.)	
Religious group	Pop.	%	Pop.	%	Pop.	%	Pop.	%	Pop.	%	Pop.	%	Pop.	%
Islam	6,201,859	78.09%	6,766,545	76.07%	7,951,155	76.25%	8,494,314	76.49%	8,975,288	75.49%	10,570,029	75.28%	13,022,160	75.06%
Hinduism	1,449,913	18.26%	1,727,810	19.42%	1,944,363	18.65%	1,645,758	14.82%	1,797,141	15.12%	1,957,878	13.94%	2,373,466	13.68%
Sikhism	272,908	3.44%	366,162	4.12%	483,999	4.64%	813,441	7.33%	863,091	7.26%	1,180,789	8.41%	1,530,112	8.82%
Christianity	12,992	0.16%	30,168	0.34%	42,371	0.41%	144,514	1.3%	247,030	2.08%	324,730	2.31%	395,311	2.28%
Jainism	4,352	0.05%	4,408	0.05%	5,562	0.05%	5,977	0.05%	5,930	0.05%	6,921	0.05%	9,520	0.05%
Zoroastrianism	354	0.004%	215	0.002%	300	0.003%	377	0.003%	309	0.003%	413	0.003%	312	0.002%
Buddhism	0	0%	0	0%	6	0.0001%	168	0.002%	172	0.001%	32	0.0002%	87	0.001%
Judaism	—N/a	—N/a	17	0.0002%	9	0.0001%	36	0.0003%	16	0.0001%	6	0%	7	0%
Others	21	0.0003%	17	0.0002%	0	0%	0	0%	8	0.0001%	0	0%	19,128	0.11%
Total Population	7,942,399	100%	8,895,342	100%	10,427,765	100%	11,104,585	100%	11,888,985	100%	14,040,798	100%	17,350,103	100%
Territory comprises the contemporary subdivisions of Punjab, Pakistan and Islamabad Capital Territory. Note: 186 villages and 2 towns — Khemkaran and Patti — in Kasur Tehsil (Lahore District) fell on the eastern side of the Radcliffe Line, but their population numbers are included here as detailed sub-tehsil religious data did not exist at the time. According to the 1941 census, Kasur Tehsil had a total of 322 villages and 3 towns, roughly half fell on the western side of the Radcliffe Line.

Religion in East Punjab (1881–1941)
Religious group	1881 (Note: 1881 figure taken from census data by combining the total population of all districts (Hisar, Rohtak, Gurgaon, Delhi, Karnal, Sirsa, Jalandhar, Ludhiana, Firozpur, Amritsar, Simla, Kangra, Ambala, Hoshiarpur, and Gurdaspur (minus Shakargarh Tehsil)), and princely states (Loharu, Dujana, Pataudi, Kalsia, Kapurthala, Malerkotla, Faridkot, Patiala, Jind, Nabha, and Simla Hill) in Punjab Province, British India that ultimately fell on the eastern side of the Radcliffe Line. See 1881 census data here: Immediately following the partition of India in 1947, these districts and princely states would ultimately make up the subdivision of East Punjab, which also included Patiala and East Punjab States Union, Chief Commissioner's Province of Himachal Pradesh, and Bilaspur State. The states that make up this region in the contemporary era are Punjab, India, Chandigarh, Haryana, and Himachal Pradesh.)		1891 (Note: 1891 figure taken from census data by combining the total population of all districts (Hisar, Rohtak, Gurgaon, Delhi, Karnal, Jalandhar, Ludhiana, Firozpur, Amritsar, Simla, Kangra, Ambala, Hoshiarpur, and Gurdaspur (minus Shakargarh Tehsil)), and princely states (Loharu, Dujana, Pataudi, Kalsia, Kapurthala, Malerkotla, Faridkot, Patiala, Jind, Nabha, Nahan, Simla Hill, Mandi, and Chamba) in Punjab Province, British India that ultimately fell on the eastern side of the Radcliffe Line. See 1891 census data here: Immediately following the partition of India in 1947, these districts and princely states would ultimately make up the subdivision of East Punjab, which also included Patiala and East Punjab States Union, Chief Commissioner's Province of Himachal Pradesh, and Bilaspur State. The states that make up this region in the contemporary era are Punjab, India, Chandigarh, Haryana, and Himachal Pradesh.)		1901 (Note: 1901 figure taken from census data by combining the total population of all districts (Hisar, Rohtak, Gurgaon, Delhi, Karnal, Jalandhar, Ludhiana, Firozpur, Amritsar, Simla, Kangra, Ambala, Hoshiarpur, and Gurdaspur (minus Shakargarh Tehsil)), and princely states (Loharu, Dujana, Pataudi, Kalsia, Kapurthala, Malerkotla, Faridkot, Patiala, Jind, Nabha, Nahan, Simla Hill, Mandi, Suket, and Chamba) in Punjab Province, British India that ultimately fell on the eastern side of the Radcliffe Line. See 1901 census data here: Immediately following the partition of India in 1947, these districts and princely states would ultimately make up the subdivision of East Punjab, which also included Patiala and East Punjab States Union, Chief Commissioner's Province of Himachal Pradesh, and Bilaspur State. The states that make up this region in the contemporary era are Punjab, India, Chandigarh, Haryana, and Himachal Pradesh.)		1911 (Note: 1911 figure taken from census data by combining the total population of all districts (Hisar, Rohtak, Gurgaon, Delhi, Karnal, Jalandhar, Ludhiana, Firozpur, Amritsar, Simla, Kangra, Ambala, Hoshiarpur, and Gurdaspur (minus Shakargarh Tehsil)), and princely states (Loharu, Dujana, Pataudi, Kalsia, Kapurthala, Malerkotla, Faridkot, Patiala, Jind, Nabha, Nahan, Simla Hill, Mandi, Suket, and Chamba) in Punjab Province, British India that ultimately fell on the eastern side of the Radcliffe Line. See 1911 census data here: Immediately following the partition of India in 1947, these districts and princely states would ultimately make up the subdivision of East Punjab, which also included Patiala and East Punjab States Union, Chief Commissioner's Province of Himachal Pradesh, and Bilaspur State. The states that make up this region in the contemporary era are Punjab, India, Chandigarh, Haryana, and Himachal Pradesh.)		1921 (Note: 1921 figure taken from census data by combining the total population of all districts (Hisar, Rohtak, Gurgaon, Karnal, Jalandhar, Ludhiana, Firozpur, Amritsar, Simla, Kangra, Ambala, Hoshiarpur, and Gurdaspur (minus Shakargarh Tehsil)), and princely states (Loharu, Dujana, Pataudi, Kalsia, Kapurthala, Malerkotla, Faridkot, Patiala, Jind, Nabha, Nahan, Simla Hill, Bilaspur, Mandi, Suket, and Chamba) in Punjab Province, British India that ultimately fell on the eastern side of the Radcliffe Line. See 1921 census data here: Immediately following the partition of India in 1947, these districts and princely states would ultimately make up the subdivision of East Punjab, which also included Patiala and East Punjab States Union, Chief Commissioner's Province of Himachal Pradesh, and Bilaspur State. The states that make up this region in the contemporary era are Punjab, India, Chandigarh, Haryana, and Himachal Pradesh.)		1931 (Note: 1931 figure taken from census data by combining the total population of all districts (Hisar, Rohtak, Gurgaon, Karnal, Jalandhar, Ludhiana, Firozpur, Amritsar, Simla, Kangra, Ambala, Hoshiarpur, and Gurdaspur (minus Shakargarh Tehsil)), and princely states (Loharu, Dujana, Pataudi, Kalsia, Kapurthala, Malerkotla, Faridkot, Patiala, Jind, Nabha, Sirmoor, Simla Hill, Bilaspur, Mandi, Suket, and Chamba) in Punjab Province, British India that ultimately fell on the eastern side of the Radcliffe Line. See 1931 census data here: Immediately following the partition of India in 1947, these districts and princely states would ultimately make up the subdivision of East Punjab, which also included Patiala and East Punjab States Union, Chief Commissioner's Province of Himachal Pradesh, and Bilaspur State. The states that make up this region in the contemporary era are Punjab, India, Chandigarh, Haryana, and Himachal Pradesh.)		1941 (Note: 1941 figure taken from census data by combining the total population of all districts (Hisar, Rohtak, Gurgaon, Karnal, Jalandhar, Ludhiana, Firozpur, Amritsar, Simla, Kangra, Ambala, Hoshiarpur, and Gurdaspur (minus Shakargarh Tehsil)), and princely states (Loharu, Dujana, Pataudi, Kalsia, Kapurthala, Malerkotla, Faridkot, Patiala, Jind, Nabha, Sirmoor, Simla Hill, Bilaspur, Mandi, Suket, and Chamba) in Punjab Province, British India that ultimately fell on the eastern side of the Radcliffe Line. See 1941 census data here: Immediately following the partition of India in 1947, these districts and princely states would ultimately make up the subdivision of East Punjab, which also included Patiala and East Punjab States Union, Chief Commissioner's Province of Himachal Pradesh, and Bilaspur State. The states that make up this region in the contemporary era are Punjab, India, Chandigarh, Haryana, and Himachal Pradesh.)	
Religious group	Pop.	%	Pop.	%	Pop.	%	Pop.	%	Pop.	%	Pop.	%	Pop.	%
Hinduism	7,645,262	59.7%	8,342,906	59.79%	8,400,106	58.63%	7,127,863	54.48%	7,002,510	53%	7,060,631	48.86%	7,963,083	46.95%
Islam	3,670,886	28.67%	4,061,083	29.11%	4,232,190	29.54%	3,781,163	28.9%	3,838,095	29.05%	4,359,867	30.17%	5,237,584	30.88%
Sikhism	1,433,257	11.19%	1,483,209	10.63%	1,618,897	11.3%	2,070,288	15.82%	2,244,205	16.99%	2,890,835	20.01%	3,586,073	21.14%
Jainism	38,220	0.3%	41,167	0.3%	44,421	0.31%	40,798	0.31%	35,391	0.27%	36,219	0.25%	35,955	0.21%
Christianity	15,062	0.12%	18,304	0.13%	24,220	0.17%	55,237	0.42%	85,909	0.65%	94,623	0.65%	117,155	0.69%
Buddhism	3,251	0.03%	6,236	0.04%	6,934	0.05%	7,522	0.06%	5,740	0.04%	7,721	0.05%	767	0.005%
Zoroastrianism	59	0.0005%	149	0.001%	177	0.001%	276	0.002%	217	0.002%	156	0.001%	4,047	0.02%
Judaism	—N/a	—N/a	12	0.0001%	15	0.0001%	18	0.0001%	3	0%	7	0%	32	0.0002%
Others	36	0.0003%	11	0.0001%	12	0.0001%	0	0%	5	0%	0	0%	15,062	0.09%
Total Population	12,806,033	100%	13,953,077	100%	14,326,972	100%	13,083,165	100%	13,212,075	100%	14,450,059	100%	16,959,758	100%
Territory comprises the contemporary subdivisions of Punjab, India, Chandigarh, Haryana, Himachal Pradesh, and National Capital Territory of Delhi (until 1911). Note: 186 villages and 2 towns — Khemkaran and Patti — in Kasur Tehsil (Lahore District) fell on the eastern side of the Radcliffe Line, but their population numbers are not included here as detailed sub-tehsil religious data did not exist at the time. According to the 1941 census, Kasur Tehsil had a total of 322 villages and 3 towns, roughly half fell on the western side of the Radcliffe Line.

=== Subdivisions ===
Religion in the Districts & Princely States of Punjab Province (1941)
District/ Princely state	Islam		Hinduism		Sikhism		Christianity		Jainism		Others (Note: Including Buddhism, Zoroastrianism, Judaism, Tribals, others, or not stated)		Total	
District/ Princely state	Pop.	%	Pop.	%	Pop.	%	Pop.	%	Pop.	%	Pop.	%	Pop.	%
Patiala State	436,539	22.55%	597,488	30.86%	896,021	46.28%	1,592	0.08%	3,101	0.16%	1,518	0.08%	1,936,259	100%
Lahore District	1,027,772	60.62%	284,689	16.79%	310,646	18.32%	70,147	4.14%	1,951	0.12%	170	0.01%	1,695,375	100%
Multan District	1,157,911	78.01%	249,872	16.83%	61,628	4.15%	14,290	0.96%	552	0.04%	80	0.01%	1,484,333	100%
Firozpur district	641,448	45.07%	287,733	20.22%	479,486	33.69%	12,607	0.89%	1,674	0.12%	128	0.01%	1,423,076	100%
Amritsar district	657,695	46.52%	217,431	15.38%	510,845	36.13%	25,973	1.84%	1,911	0.14%	21	0%	1,413,876	100%
Lyallpur District	877,518	62.85%	204,059	14.61%	262,737	18.82%	51,948	3.72%	35	0%	8	0%	1,396,305	100%
Bahawalpur State	1,098,814	81.93%	174,408	13%	46,945	3.5%	3,048	0.23%	351	0.03%	17,643	1.32%	1,341,209	100%
Montgomery District	918,564	69.11%	210,966	15.87%	175,064	13.17%	24,432	1.84%	49	0%	28	0%	1,329,103	100%
Sialkot District	739,218	62.09%	231,319	19.43%	139,409	11.71%	75,831	6.37%	3,250	0.27%	1,470	0.12%	1,190,497	100%
Hoshiarpur district	380,759	32.53%	584,080	49.91%	198,194	16.93%	6,165	0.53%	1,125	0.1%	0	0%	1,170,323	100%
Jalandhar district	509,804	45.23%	311,010	27.59%	298,741	26.5%	6,233	0.55%	1,395	0.12%	7	0%	1,127,190	100%
Gujrat District	945,609	85.58%	84,643	7.66%	70,233	6.36%	4,449	0.4%	10	0%	8	0%	1,104,952	100%
Hill States (Note: HillStates)	37,214	3.39%	1,053,637	95.92%	6,404	0.58%	407	0.04%	210	0.02%	603	0.05%	1,098,475	100%
Hisar district	285,208	28.33%	652,842	64.85%	60,731	6.03%	1,292	0.13%	6,126	0.61%	510	0.05%	1,006,709	100%
Shahpur District	835,918	83.68%	102,172	10.23%	48,046	4.81%	12,770	1.28%	13	0%	2	0%	998,921	100%
Karnal district	304,346	30.6%	666,301	66.99%	19,887	2%	1,249	0.13%	2,789	0.28%	3	0%	994,575	100%
Rohtak district	166,569	17.42%	780,474	81.61%	1,466	0.15%	1,043	0.11%	6,847	0.72%	0	0%	956,399	100%
Gujranwala District	642,706	70.45%	108,115	11.85%	99,139	10.87%	60,829	6.67%	1,445	0.16%	0	0%	912,234	100%
Kangra district	43,249	4.81%	846,531	94.12%	4,809	0.53%	788	0.09%	101	0.01%	3,899	0.43%	899,377	100%
Gurdaspur district (Note: Does not include Shakargarh Tehsil, which was awarded to Pakistan as part of the Radcliffe Line.)	440,323	51.08%	174,221	20.21%	200,688	23.28%	46,743	5.42%	25	0%	6	0%	862,006	100%
Sheikhupura District	542,344	63.62%	89,182	10.46%	160,706	18.85%	60,054	7.04%	221	0.03%	1	0%	852,508	100%
Gurgaon district	285,992	33.59%	560,537	65.83%	637	0.07%	1,673	0.2%	2,613	0.31%	6	0%	851,458	100%
Ambala district	268,999	31.73%	412,658	48.68%	156,543	18.47%	6,065	0.72%	3,065	0.36%	415	0.05%	847,745	100%
Jhang District	678,736	82.61%	129,889	15.81%	12,238	1.49%	763	0.09%	5	0%	0	0%	821,631	100%
Ludhiana district	302,482	36.95%	171,715	20.98%	341,175	41.68%	1,913	0.23%	1,279	0.16%	51	0.01%	818,615	100%
Rawalpindi District	628,193	80%	82,478	10.5%	64,127	8.17%	9,014	1.15%	1,337	0.17%	82	0.01%	785,231	100%
Muzaffargarh District	616,074	86.42%	90,643	12.72%	5,882	0.83%	227	0.03%	0	0%	23	0%	712,849	100%
Attock District	611,128	90.42%	43,209	6.39%	20,120	2.98%	1,392	0.21%	13	0%	13	0%	675,875	100%
Jhelum District	563,033	89.42%	40,888	6.49%	24,680	3.92%	893	0.14%	159	0.03%	5	0%	629,658	100%
Dera Ghazi Khan District	512,678	88.19%	67,407	11.59%	1,072	0.18%	87	0.01%	106	0.02%	0	0%	581,350	100%
Mianwali District	436,260	86.16%	62,814	12.41%	6,865	1.36%	358	0.07%	23	0%	1	0%	506,321	100%
Kapurthala State	213,754	56.49%	61,546	16.27%	88,350	23.35%	1,667	0.44%	380	0.1%	12,683	3.35%	378,380	100%
Jind State	50,972	14.09%	268,355	74.17%	40,981	11.33%	161	0.04%	1,294	0.36%	49	0.01%	361,812	100%
Nabha State	70,373	20.45%	146,518	42.59%	122,451	35.59%	221	0.06%	480	0.14%	1	0%	344,044	100%
Shakargarh Tehsil (Note: Part of Gurdaspur District which was awarded to Pakistan as part of the Radcliffe Line.)	149,600	51.32%	116,553	39.98%	20,573	7.06%	4,779	1.64%	0	0%	0	0%	291,505	100%
Faridkot State	61,352	30.79%	21,814	10.95%	115,070	57.74%	247	0.12%	800	0.4%	0	0%	199,283	100%
Malerkotla State	33,881	38.45%	23,482	26.65%	30,320	34.41%	116	0.13%	310	0.35%	0	0%	88,109	100%
Kalsia State	25,049	37.17%	29,866	44.32%	12,235	18.15%	55	0.08%	188	0.28%	0	0%	67,393	100%
Biloch Trans–Frontier Tract	40,084	99.6%	160	0.4%	2	0%	0	0%	0	0%	0	0%	40,246	100%
Simla District	7,022	18.2%	29,466	76.38%	1,032	2.68%	934	2.42%	114	0.3%	8	0.02%	38,576	100%
Dujana State	6,939	22.63%	23,727	77.37%	0	0%	0	0%	0	0%	0	0%	30,666	100%
Loharu State	3,960	14.2%	23,923	85.77%	7	0.03%	2	0.01%	0	0%	0	0%	27,892	100%
Pataudi State	3,655	16.98%	17,728	82.38%	0	0%	9	0.04%	128	0.59%	0	0%	21,520	100%
Total	18,259,744	53.22%	10,336,549	30.13%	5,116,185	14.91%	512,466	1.49%	45,475	0.13%	39,442	0.11%	34,309,861	100%
Territory comprises the contemporary subdivisions of Punjab, India, Chandigarh Union Territory, Haryana, Himachal Pradesh, Punjab, Pakistan, and Islamabad Capital Territory.

== Language ==
As with religion, Punjab was a linguistically eclectically diverse province and region. In 1837, Persian had been abolished as the official language of Company administration and replaced by local Indian vernacular languages. In the Sikh Empire, Persian continued to be the official state language. Shortly after annexing the Punjab in 1849, the Board of Administration canvassed local officials in each of the provinces's six divisions to decide which language was "best suited for the Courts and Public Business". Officials in the western divisions recommended Persian whilst eastern officials suggested a shift to Urdu. In September 1849 a two-language policy was instituted throughout the province. The language policy in the Punjab differed from other Indian provinces in that Urdu was not a widespread local vernacular. In 1849 John Lawrence noted "that Urdu is not the language of these districts and neither is Persian".

In 1854, the Board of Administration abruptly ended the two-language policy and Urdu was designated as the official language of government across the province. The decision was motivated by new civil service rules requiring all officials pass a test in the official language of their local court. In fear of potentially losing their jobs, officials in Persian districts petitioned the board to replace Persian with Urdu, believing Urdu the easier language to master. Urdu remained the official administrative language until 1947.

Officials, although aware that Punjabi was the colloquial language of the majority, instead favoured the use of Urdu for a number of reasons. Criticism of Punjabi included the belief that it was simply a form of patois, lacking any form of standardisation, and that "would be inflexible and barren, and incapable of expressing nice shades of meaning and exact logical ideas with the precision so essential in local proceedings." Similar arguments had earlier been made about Bengali, Oriya and Hindustani; however, those languages were later adopted for local administration. Instead it is believed the advantages of Urdu served the administration greater. Urdu, and initially Persian, allowed the Company to recruit experienced administrators from elsewhere in India who did not speak Punjabi, to facilitate greater integration with other Indian territories which were administered with Urdu, and to help foster ties with local elites who spoke Persian and Urdu and could act as intermediaries with the wider populace.

In regards to local Indo-Aryan lects and regional dialects amongst the five British-era divisions and the NWFP:

- Ambala division:
  - Gurgaon, Rohtak, and Hisar districts: predominantly Haryanvi
  - Ambala district: predominantly Puadhi
  - Shimla district: predominantly Pahari
  - Karnal district: mixed Haryanvi and Punjabi
- Multan division: predominantly Saraiki
- Rawalpindi division: predominantly Pothwari
- Lahore division: predominantly Majhi
- Jalandhar division:
  - Jalandhar and Hoshiarpur districts: predominantly Doabi
  - Ludhiana and Ferozepore districts: predominantly Malwai
  - Kangra district: predominantly Dogri
- North-West Frontier Province: predominantly Hindko
- Princely states: most areas were predominantly Malwai and Haryanvi with exception of Kapurthala State

Language in Punjab Province (1881–1931)
Mother tongue	1881		1931	
Mother tongue	Pop.	%	Pop.	%
Punjabi	14,895,747 (Note: Standard Punjabi: 13,266,525 Lahnda: 1,513,778 Other: 115,444)	71.79%	21,893,702 (Note: Standard Punjabi: 14,515,090 Lahnda: 7,378,252 Other: 360)	76.84%
Hindustani	4,193,440	20.21%	3,988,023	14%
Pahari	1,378,512	6.64%	1,699,152	5.96%
Rajasthani	116,721	0.56%	618,396	2.17%
Kashmiri	45,797	0.22%	21,822	0.08%
Pashto	32,974	0.16%	92,554	0.32%
Tibetic	27,474	0.13%	62,703	0.22%
Balochi	23,238	0.11%	60,985	0.21%
English	23,026	0.11%	26,204	0.09%
Sindhi	4,924	0.02%	11,581	0.04%
Bengali	2,681	0.01%	2,667	0.01%
Persian	2,117	0.01%	4,000	0.01%
Gujarati & Marathi	621	0%	3,494	0.01%
Dravidian	245	0%	976	0%
Arabic & Turkish	234	0%	675	0%
Others	681	0%	3,923	0.01%
Total population	20,748,432	100%	28,490,857	100%
Territory comprises the contemporary subdivisions of Punjab, India, Chandigarh Union Territory, Haryana, Himachal Pradesh, National Capital Territory of Delhi (until 1911), Punjab, Pakistan, and Islamabad Capital Territory.

=== 1931 census ===
According to the 1931 Census of British Punjab Province, Punjabi was the most widely spoken language, with 50.94% of the population reporting it, and 50.49% declaring it as their mother tongue (MT). Lahnda followed with 25.90% total speakers (25.66% MT), and Hindustani accounted for 14.00% (13.75% MT). Other languages included Western Pahari (5.93%), Rajasthani (2.15%), Pashto (0.32%), Balochi (0.21%), and Kashmiri (0.08%). Additionally, 0.47% of the population spoke languages categorized as 'Others'. The table below presents the full linguistic distribution, including both total speakers and those who reported each language as their mother tongue.

Mother Tongue Language Statistics from 1931 Census of Punjab Province
District or State	Punjabi		Lahnda		Hindustani		Western Pahadi		Rajasthani		Others (Note: Includes Pashto, Balochi, Kashmiri, and other languages.)	
	Total	MT only	Total	MT only	Total	MT only	Total	MT only	Total	MT only	Total	MT only
Punjab	50.94%	50.49%	25.90%	25.66%	14.00%	13.75%	5.93%	5.90%	2.15%	2.10%	1.08%	2.10%
Indo-Gangetic Plain West	66.97%	66.16%	2.00%	2.00%	25.91%	25.50%	0.31%	0.30%	4.43%	4.35%	0.38%	1.69%
Hissar	24.43%	24.36%	0.00%	0.00%	54.01%	53.98%	0.00%	0.00%	21.54%	21.17%	0.02%	0.49%
Loharu State	0.07%	0.02%	0.00%	0.00%	99.92%	99.92%	0.00%	0.00%	0.00%	0.00%	0.01%	0.06%
Rohtak	0.07%	0.03%	0.00%	0.00%	99.91%	99.91%	0.00%	0.00%	0.00%	0.00%	0.02%	0.06%
Dujana State	0.05%	0.05%	0.00%	0.00%	99.93%	99.93%	0.00%	0.00%	0.00%	0.00%	0.02%	0.02%
Gurgaon	0.12%	0.03%	0.00%	0.00%	78.25%	78.25%	0.00%	0.00%	21.39%	21.58%	0.24%	0.14%
Pataudi State	0.01%	0.01%	0.00%	0.00%	99.98%	99.98%	0.00%	0.00%	0.00%	0.00%	0.01%	0.01%
Karnal	1.95%	1.79%	0.00%	0.00%	98.03%	98.01%	0.00%	0.00%	0.00%	0.00%	0.04%	0.20%
Jullundur	99.55%	99.45%	0.00%	0.00%	0.27%	0.18%	0.00%	0.00%	0.00%	0.00%	0.18%	0.37%
Kapurthala State	99.84%	99.71%	0.00%	0.00%	0.14%	0.13%	0.00%	0.00%	0.00%	0.00%	0.02%	0.16%
Ludhiana	97.80%	96.32%	0.00%	0.00%	1.82%	1.54%	0.01%	0.01%	0.02%	0.02%	0.35%	2.11%
Maler Kotla State	99.67%	99.63%	0.00%	0.00%	0.32%	0.19%	0.00%	0.00%	0.00%	0.00%	0.01%	0.18%
Ferozepore	90.29%	90.19%	0.00%	0.00%	4.04%	3.80%	0.00%	0.00%	5.28%	5.12%	0.39%	0.89%
Faridkot State	94.95%	94.68%	0.00%	0.00%	2.90%	1.33%	0.00%	0.00%	0.35%	0.14%	1.80%	3.85%
Patiala State	85.29%	84.57%	0.00%	0.00%	2.94%	2.61%	2.36%	2.33%	9.39%	9.19%	0.02%	1.30%
Jind State	20.54%	20.47%	0.00%	0.00%	79.35%	79.12%	0.01%	0.01%	0.07%	0.07%	0.03%	0.33%
Nabha State	70.89%	70.89%	0.00%	0.00%	29.03%	28.54%	0.00%	0.00%	0.07%	0.07%	0.01%	0.50%
Lahore	92.02%	86.72%	0.03%	0.01%	6.13%	3.93%	0.05%	0.02%	0.06%	0.04%	1.71%	9.28%
Amritsar	98.07%	97.91%	0.00%	0.00%	1.01%	0.51%	0.03%	0.00%	0.08%	0.03%	0.81%	1.55%
Gujranwala	78.23%	78.16%	21.23%	21.23%	0.27%	0.16%	0.02%	0.00%	0.01%	0.01%	0.24%	0.44%
Sheikhupura	84.51%	84.43%	14.43%	14.43%	0.77%	0.55%	0.00%	0.00%	0.03%	0.01%	0.26%	0.58%
Himalayan	4.52%	4.27%	0.00%	0.00%	1.75%	1.69%	89.64%	89.23%	0.02%	0.02%	4.07%	4.79%
Sirmoor State	7.90%	7.86%	0.00%	0.00%	16.24%	16.20%	75.39%	75.34%	0.10%	0.10%	0.37%	0.50%
Simla	14.45%	10.25%	0.00%	0.00%	14.74%	12.46%	61.42%	52.10%	0.11%	0.05%	9.28% (Note: Includes 3.09% Kashmiri speakers.)	25.04% (Note: Includes 0.89% Kashmiri speakers.)
Simla Hill states	10.72%	10.53%	0.00%	0.00%	0.28%	0.26%	79.83%	78.97%	0.01%	0.00%	9.16%	10.24%
Bilaspur state	10.69%	10.68%	0.00%	0.00%	0.02%	0.02%	89.28%	89.28%	0.00%	0.00%	0.01%	0.02%
Kangra	1.64%	1.51%	0.00%	0.00%	0.16%	0.15%	94.05%	94.00%	0.02%	0.02%	4.13%	4.32%
Mandi State	1.66%	1.53%	0.00%	0.00%	0.09%	0.08%	96.79%	96.75%	0.01%	0.01%	1.45%	1.63%
Suket State	1.33%	1.27%	0.00%	0.00%	0.02%	0.01%	98.44%	98.43%	0.00%	0.00%	0.21%	0.29%
Chamba State	1.47%	0.73%	0.00%	0.00%	0.03%	0.03%	95.77%	95.39%	0.00%	0.00%	2.73%	3.85%
Sub-Himalayan	61.37%	61.07%	29.26%	29.20%	8.53%	8.41%	0.07%	0.04%	0.02%	0.01%	0.75%	1.27%
Ambala	35.61%	35.20%	0.00%	0.00%	63.45%	63.26%	0.17%	0.11%	0.15%	0.10%	0.62%	1.33%
Kalsia State	17.63%	17.58%	0.00%	0.00%	82.21%	82.18%	0.00%	0.00%	0.04%	0.04%	0.12%	0.20%
Hoshiarpur	99.79%	99.79%	0.00%	0.00%	0.16%	0.11%	0.01%	0.01%	0.01%	0.00%	0.03%	0.09%
Gurdaspur	98.94%	98.91%	0.00%	0.00%	0.34%	0.20%	0.27%	0.11%	0.00%	0.00%	0.45%	0.78%
Sialkot	99.46%	99.45%	0.00%	0.00%	0.19%	0.15%	0.00%	0.00%	0.01%	0.01%	0.34%	0.39%
Gujrat	68.36%	67.72%	30.68%	30.68%	0.74%	0.46%	0.01%	0.00%	0.00%	0.00%	0.21%	1.14%
Jhelum	10.86%	9.63%	88.05%	88.05%	0.27%	0.17%	0.00%	0.00%	0.00%	0.00%	0.82%	2.15%
Rawalpindi	4.36%	4.06%	91.87%	91.83%	2.26%	2.13%	0.07%	0.06%	0.00%	0.00%	1.44%	1.92%
Attock	2.02%	1.81%	93.71%	93.17%	0.28%	0.23%	0.00%	0.00%	0.00%	0.00%	3.99% (Note: Includes 3.88% Pashto speakers.)	4.79% (Note: Includes 3.01% Pashto speakers.)
North-West Dry Area	25.18%	25.13%	71.42%	70.57%	0.95%	0.84%	0.07%	0.07%	0.56%	0.50%	1.82%	2.89%
Montgomery	42.97%	42.89%	53.55%	53.51%	1.73%	1.56%	0.45%	0.44%	0.62%	0.59%	0.68%	1.01%
Shahpur	28.13%	28.03%	70.00%	69.99%	1.13%	0.93%	0.01%	0.01%	0.00%	0.00%	0.73%	1.04%
Mianwali	1.78%	1.62%	91.36%	90.96%	0.11%	0.08%	0.00%	0.00%	0.01%	0.00%	6.74% (Note: Includes 6.68% Pashto speakers.)	7.34% (Note: Includes 6.12% Pashto speakers.)
Lyallpur	80.76%	80.73%	17.96%	17.95%	0.90%	0.69%	0.06%	0.00%	0.15%	0.09%	0.23%	0.54%
Jhang	4.90%	4.89%	94.85%	94.85%	0.08%	0.07%	0.03%	0.03%	0.00%	0.00%	0.14%	0.16%
Multan	11.23%	11.24%	86.25%	86.21%	1.09%	1.05%	0.00%	0.00%	0.17%	0.13%	1.26%	1.37%
Bahawalpur State	7.53%	7.46%	86.32%	86.12%	1.77%	1.62%	0.00%	0.00%	3.12%	2.79%	1.26%	1.86%
Muzaffargarh	0.64%	0.62%	98.84%	98.72%	0.22%	0.21%	0.01%	0.01%	0.07%	0.07%	0.22%	0.37%
Dera Ghazi Khan	0.48%	0.48%	87.75%	76.54%	0.02%	0.01%	0.00%	0.00%	0.03%	0.02%	11.72% (Note: Includes 11.02% Balochi speakers.)	22.95% (Note: Includes 9.11% Balochi speakers.)
Note: All district boundaries have seen many changes after 1947, so their boundaries are not the same as today.

Summary of the table above 1931 language census of Punjab: In pre-partition Punjab, the linguistic landscape was divided into major zones based on dominant languages and influence: Punjabi-Dominant Regions: These districts were overwhelmingly Punjabi-speaking — Hoshiarpur, Kapurthala State, Malerkotla, Jullundur, Sialkot, Gurdaspur, Amritsar, Ludhiana, Faridkot State, Ferozepore, Lahore, Patiala, and Nabha State. Punjabi with Lahnda Influence: Districts where Punjabi was dominant but there was also significant Lahnda influence included Shekhupura, Lyallpur, Gujranwala, and Gujrat.Lahnda with Punjabi Influence: Regions like Jhelum, Multan, Shahpur, and Montgomery were Lahnda-dominant but retained a strong influence of Punjabi.Lahnda-Dominant Regions: These districts were primarily Lahnda-speaking — Muzaffargarh, Jhang, Attock, Rawalpindi, Mianwali, Jhelum, Dera Ghazi Khan, Bahawalpur State, and Multan. And Mianwali, and Attock showed a small influence of Pashto while Dera Ghazi Khan had influence of Balochi, especially in their western parts.Hill Regions: The hill districts namely Kangra, Simla, and Simla Hill states & other hill States with few part of Patiala State(2.33%) specially its kandaghat tahsil were dominated by Western Pahari speakers. while some part of Simla Hill states(10.72%) also have influence of Punjabi. Hindustani and Rajasthani Zones: In Ambala Division, districts such as Delhi, Karnal, Rohtak, and Gurgaon were primarily Hindustani- and Rajasthani-speaking. However, Ambala (35.6%) and Hissar (24.4%) had significant Punjabi-speaking populations with Hindustani and Rajasthani Majority. Additionally, the majority of Jind State and parts of Patiala and Nabha State that geographically surrounded the Ambala Division were linguistic enclaves of Hindustani and Rajasthani. A very small part of Ferozepore had influence from Hindustani and Rajasthani languages.

=== 1911 census ===
As per the 1911 census, speakers of the Punjabi dialects and languages, including standard Punjabi along with Lahnda (Note: Western Punjabi languages and dialects including Saraiki, Hindko and Pahari-Pothwari, and other related languages or dialects) formed just over three-quarters (75.93 per cent) of the total provincial population.

Language in Punjab Province by geographical division (1911 census)
Language	Total Punjab Province	Indo–Gangetic Plain West (Note: Districts: Hisar, Loharu State, Rohtak, Gurgaon, Delhi, Karnal, Jalandhar, Ludhiana, Firozpur, Lahore, Amritsar, and Gujranwala. Princely States: Loharu, Dujana, Pataudi, Kapurthala, Malerkotla, Faridkot, Patiala, Jind, and Nabha)	Himalayan (Note: Districts: Simla and Kangra. Princely States: Nahan, Mandi, Suket, Chamba, and other Simla Hill States)	Sub–Himalayan (Note: Districts: Ambala, Hoshiarpur, Gurdaspur, Sialkot, Gujrat, Jhelum, Rawalpindi, and Attock. Princely States: Kalsia)	North–West Dry Area (Note: Districts: Montgomery, Shahpur, Mianwali, Lyallpur, Jhang, Multan, Muzaffargarh, and Dera Ghazi Khan. Princely States: Bahawalpur)
Language	%	%	%	%	%
Punjabi (Note: Standard Punjabi: 58.34% Lahnda: 17.59%)	75.93% (Note: Standard Punjabi: 58.34% Lahnda: 17.59%)	64.49% (Note: Standard Punjabi: 63.49% Lahnda: 1.0%)	45.15%	88.77% (Note: Standard Punjabi: 74.01% Lahnda: 14.76%)	96.45% (Note: Lahnda: 60.31% Standard Punjabi: 36.14%)
Western Hindi (Note: Including Hindustani (Hindi and Urdu), Braj Bhasha, Haryanvi, and other related languages or dialects)	15.82%	29.56%	1.39%	8.81%	0.56%
Western Pahari	4.11%	0.87%	50.22%	1.49%	0.01%
Rajasthani	3.0%	6.26%	0.02%	0.01%	0.62%
Balochi	0.29%	—N/a	—N/a	—N/a	1.25%
Pashto	0.28%	0.07%	0.01%	0.5%	0.53%
English	0.15%	0.11%	0.2%	0.3%	0.05%
Other	0.42%	0.13%	3.0%	0.12%	0.53%

== Literacy ==
Literacy Rate by Religious Community in Punjab Province 1941

Religion	% Total Literacy	% Total Male Literacy	% Total Female Literacy
Jains	41.93%	29.03%	12.90%
Sikhs	17.03%	12.13%	4.90%
Hindus	16.35%	11.89%	4.46%
Christians	7.76%	4.69%	3.07%
Muslims	6.97%	5.52%	1.45%
Others	7.62%	6.85%	0.77%
Total	10.87%	8.13%	2.74%

== Education ==
In 1854, the Punjab education department was instituted with a policy to provide secular education in all government managed institutions. Privately run institutions would only receive grants-in-aid in return for providing secular instruction. By 1864 this had resulted in a situation whereby all grants-in-aid to higher education schools and colleges were received by institutions under European management, and no indigenous owned schools received government help.

In the early 1860s, a number of educational colleges were established, including Lawrence College, Murree, King Edward Medical University, Government College, Lahore, Glancy Medical College and Forman Christian College. In 1882, Gottlieb Wilhelm Leitner published a damning report on the state of education in the Punjab. He lamented the failure to reconcile government run schools with traditional indigenous schools, and noted a steady decline in the number of schools across the province since annexation. He noted in particular how Punjabi Muslim's avoided government run schools due to the lack of religious subjects taught in them, observing how at least 120,000 Punjabis attended schools unsupported by the state and describing it as 'a protest by the people against our system of education.' Leitner had long advocated the benefits of oriental scholarship, and the fusion of government education with religious instruction. In January 1865 he had established the Anjuman-i-Punjab, a subscription based association aimed at using a European style of learning to promote useful knowledge, whilst also reviving traditional scholarship in Arabic, Persian and Sanskrit. In 1884, a reorganisation of the Punjab education system occurred, introducing measures tending towards decentralisation of control over education and the promotion of an indigenous education agency. As a consequence several new institutions were encouraged in the province. The Arya Samaj opened a college in Lahore in 1886, the Sikhs opened the Khalsa College whilst the Anjuman-i-Himayat-i-Islam stepped in to organise Muslim education. In 1886, the Punjab Chiefs' College, later renamed Aitchison College, was opened to further the education of the elite classes.

== Tribes ==
Punjab Province was diverse, with the main castes represented alongside numerous subcastes and tribes (also known as Jāti or Barādarī), forming parts of the various ethnic groups in the province, contemporarily known as Punjabis, Saraikis, Haryanvis, Hindkowans, Dogras, Paharis, Potoharis, Himachalis, Bagri people and other non related ethnicities were Kashmiris, Balti people, Ladakhi people, Pashtuns, Baloch people, Marwaris.

Tribes of Punjab Province (1881–1931)
Tribe	1881		1891		1901		1911		1921		1931	
Tribe	Pop.	%	Pop.	%	Pop.	%	Pop.	%	Pop.	%	Pop.	%
Jat	4,223,885	20.31%	4,500,340	19.64%	4,884,285	20.04%	4,891,060	20.56%	5,453,747	21.73%	6,070,032	23.74%
Rajput	1,648,426	7.92%	1,747,989	7.63%	1,784,402	7.32%	1,586,274	6.67%	1,853,025	7.38%	2,792,060	10.92%
Brahman	1,040,771	5%	1,069,132	4.67%	1,077,252	4.42%	985,901	4.14%	994,529	3.96%	1,058,598	4.14%
Chuhra	1,039,039	5%	1,175,504	5.13%	1,175,003	4.82%	912,998	3.84%	750,596	2.99%	681,359	2.66%
Chamar	1,033,727	4.97%	1,147,913	5.01%	1,172,118	4.81%	1,075,941	4.52%	1,134,700	4.52%	1,102,465	4.31%
Arain	795,471	3.82%	890,264	3.88%	1,003,698	4.12%	973,888	4.09%	1,086,455	4.33%	1,331,295	5.21%
Julaha	593,199	2.85%	620,401	2.71%	651,800	2.67%	626,960	2.64%	643,403	2.56%	672,243	2.63%
Tarkhan	564,385	2.71%	621,718	2.71%	675,361	2.77%	637,971	2.68%	614,912	2.45%	654,053	2.56%
Gujjar	539,251	2.59%	600,198	2.62%	611,904	2.51%	595,598	2.5%	627,451	2.5%	696,442	2.72%
Arora	538,465	2.59%	603,131	2.63%	647,945	2.66%	667,943	2.81%	707,495	2.82%	775,734	3.03%
Kumhar	465,676	2.24%	515,331	2.25%	561,298	2.3%	542,906	2.28%	570,158	2.27%	620,402	2.43%
Bania	437,000	2.1%	442,000	1.93%	452,000	1.85%	404,000	1.7%	374,169	1.49%	—N/a	—N/a
Jhinwar	418,499	2.01%	458,702	2%	450,362	1.85%	331,951	1.4%	371,418	1.48%	281,512	1.1%
Khatri	392,413	1.89%	418,517	1.83%	433,579	1.78%	423,704	1.78%	452,902	1.8%	516,207	2.02%
Awan	350,848	1.69%	389,402	1.7%	420,504	1.73%	425,450	1.79%	439,975	1.75%	539,242	2.11%
Kanet	346,000	1.66%	370,000	1.61%	390,000	1.6%	404,000	1.7%	288,159	1.15%	305,814	1.2%
Mochi	334,034	1.61%	384,179	1.68%	408,314	1.68%	410,977	1.73%	429,242	1.71%	472,616	1.85%
Baloch	331,851	1.6%	383,138	1.67%	466,645	1.92%	530,976	2.23%	531,084	2.12%	624,695	2.44%
Nai	323,703	1.56%	371,144	1.62%	370,019	1.52%	344,845	1.45%	360,653	1.44%	380,657	1.49%
Sheikh	293,606	1.41%	287,778	1.26%	264,656	1.09%	276,687	1.16%	244,800	0.98%	414,623	1.62%
Lohar	291,506	1.4%	323,420	1.41%	347,099	1.42%	319,847	1.34%	322,195	1.28%	333,910	1.31%
Teli	250,544	1.2%	291,513	1.27%	309,433	1.27%	284,505	1.2%	305,122	1.22%	346,342	1.35%
Pathan	210,613	1.01%	221,262	0.97%	246,790	1.01%	272,547	1.15%	261,729	1.04%	350,008	1.37%
Sayyid	200,728	0.96%	217,034	0.95%	230,802	0.95%	239,160	1.01%	247,087	0.98%	294,223	1.15%
Mirasi	192,107	0.92%	230,700	1.01%	244,506	1%	223,093	0.94%	232,280	0.93%	244,726	0.96%
Machhi	167,882	0.81%	196,574	0.86%	236,122	0.97%	239,702	1.01%	280,956	1.12%	314,862	1.23%
Ahir	165,878	0.8%	188,838	0.82%	197,805	0.81%	201,299	0.85%	201,539	0.8%	221,933	0.87%
Kashmiri	149,733	0.72%	141,280	0.62%	189,878	0.78%	175,334	0.74%	166,449	0.66%	202,920	0.79%
Saini	147,183	0.71%	120,507	0.53%	121,722	0.5%	107,759	0.45%	120,376	0.48%	165,190	0.65%
Sunar	145,903	0.7%	164,087	0.72%	174,628	0.72%	155,993	0.66%	127,090	0.51%	159,655	0.62%
Kamboh	129,468	0.62%	150,646	0.66%	173,780	0.71%	171,536	0.72%	180,870	0.72%	239,582	0.94%
Dhobi	123,767	0.6%	139,421	0.61%	142,342	0.58%	151,566	0.64%	163,908	0.65%	175,557	0.69%
Meo	112,566	0.54%	115,916	0.51%	133,300	0.55%	120,752	0.51%	111,564	0.44%	133,089	0.52%
Faqir	111,995	0.54%	300,214	1.31%	362,266	1.49%	262,511	1.1%	270,070	1.08%	287,445	1.12%
Ghirath	110,507	0.53%	118,631	0.52%	121,718	0.5%	121,107	0.51%	117,949	0.47%	124,340	0.49%
Chhimba	100,448	0.48%	141,819	0.62%	147,152	0.6%	124,090	0.52%	120,695	0.48%	96,269	0.38%
Qassab	92,571	0.45%	109,435	0.48%	114,158	0.47%	117,363	0.49%	120,820	0.48%	127,198	0.5%
Rathi	82,957	0.4%	100,656	0.44%	37,793	0.16%	97,763	0.41%	118,015	0.47%	134,096	0.52%
Dagi & Koli	78,559	0.38%	167,772	0.73%	153,990	0.63%	172,269	0.72%	165,159	0.66%	182,235	0.71%
Mughal	92,000	0.44%	118,000	0.51%	98,000	0.4%	99,000	0.42%	88,951	0.35%	—N/a	—N/a
Jogi-Rawal	90,000	0.43%	91,000	0.4%	76,000	0.31%	83,000	0.35%	80,577	0.32%	—N/a	—N/a
Dumna	66,169	0.32%	64,046	0.28%	53,394	0.22%	72,250	0.3%	36,669	0.15%	37,541	0.15%
Dhanuk	66,000	0.32%	74,000	0.32%	77,000	0.32%	83,000	0.35%	87,278	0.35%	—N/a	—N/a
Dogar	63,000	0.01%	70,000	0.01%	75,000	0.01%	68,000	0.29%	74,369	0.3%	—N/a	—N/a
Khoja	62,000	0.3%	90,000	0.39%	99,000	0.41%	63,000	0.26%	87,461	0.35%	—N/a	—N/a
Mallah	62,000	0.3%	77,000	0.34%	73,000	0.3%	78,000	0.33%	74,233	0.3%	—N/a	—N/a
Mali	58,672	0.28%	95,989	0.42%	105,956	0.43%	96,883	0.41%	92,933	0.37%	85,758	0.34%
Bharai	56,000	0.27%	67,000	0.29%	66,000	0.27%	58,000	0.24%	61,721	0.25%	—N/a	—N/a
Barwala	55,000	0.26%	64,000	0.28%	69,000	0.28%	64,000	0.27%	65,907	0.26%	—N/a	—N/a
Mahtam	50,313	0.24%	56,982	0.25%	82,719	0.34%	81,805	0.34%	94,325	0.38%	65,262	0.26%
Labana	47,000	0.23%	55,000	0.24%	56,000	0.23%	58,000	0.24%	56,316	0.22%	—N/a	—N/a
Megh	37,373	0.18%	41,068	0.18%	44,315	0.18%	39,549	0.17%	30,465	0.12%	23,207	0.09%
Khokhar	36,000	0.17%	130,000	0.57%	108,000	0.44%	60,000	0.25%	69,169	0.28%	—N/a	—N/a
Darzi	30,190	0.15%	36,919	0.16%	39,164	0.16%	35,508	0.15%	38,256	0.15%	45,688	0.18%
Bawaria	22,013	0.11%	26,420	0.12%	29,112	0.12%	32,849	0.14%	34,807	0.14%	32,527	0.13%
Sansi	19,920	0.1%	22,218	0.1%	26,000	0.11%	24,439	0.1%	17,402	0.07%	165,190	0.65%
Od	15,652	0.08%	22,450	0.1%	26,160	0.11%	31,690	0.13%	28,502	0.11%	32,719	0.13%
Sarera	10,792	0.05%	11,366	0.05%	9,587	0.04%	10,743	0.05%	9,873	0.04%	11,230	0.04%
Pakhiwara	3,741	0.02%	3,674	0.02%	3,595	0.01%	3,711	0.02%	2,801	0.01%	4,540	0.02%
Ghosi	2,221	0.01%	2,652	0.01%	3,012	0.01%	2,419	0.01%	502	0%	3,853	0.02%
Harni	1,318	0.01%	4,157	0.02%	3,462	0.01%	3,360	0.01%	2,988	0.01%	3,928	0.02%
Maliar	—N/a	—N/a	—N/a	—N/a	81,000	0.33%	90,000	0.38%	88,755	0.35%	—N/a	—N/a
Mussalli	—N/a	—N/a	—N/a	—N/a	57,367	0.24%	309,543	1.3%	323,549	1.29%	412,300	1.61%
Qureshi	—N/a	—N/a	—N/a	—N/a	53,000	0.22%	71,000	0.3%	97,625	0.39%	—N/a	—N/a
Aggarwal	—N/a	—N/a	—N/a	—N/a	—N/a	—N/a	339,494	1.43%	349,322	1.39%	379,068	1.48%
Bagaria	—N/a	—N/a	—N/a	—N/a	—N/a	—N/a	1,262	0.01%	1,619	0.01%	2,446	0.01%
Ramdasia	—N/a	—N/a	—N/a	—N/a	—N/a	—N/a	—N/a	—N/a	—N/a	—N/a	126,487	0.49%
Kahar	—N/a	—N/a	—N/a	—N/a	—N/a	—N/a	—N/a	—N/a	—N/a	—N/a	88,656	0.35%
Tank Kshatrya	—N/a	—N/a	—N/a	—N/a	—N/a	—N/a	—N/a	—N/a	—N/a	—N/a	37,376	0.15%
Dhiman Brahman	—N/a	—N/a	—N/a	—N/a	—N/a	—N/a	—N/a	—N/a	—N/a	—N/a	13,533	0.05%
No tribe	—N/a	—N/a	—N/a	—N/a	—N/a	—N/a	—N/a	—N/a	—N/a	—N/a	6,816	0.03%
Total responses	—N/a	—N/a	—N/a	—N/a	—N/a	—N/a	—N/a	—N/a	—N/a	—N/a	25,569,792	89.75%
Total population	20,800,995	100%	22,915,894	100%	24,367,113	100%	23,791,841	100%	25,101,514	100%	28,490,869	100%

== Agriculture ==
Within a few years of its annexation, the Punjab was regarded as British India's model agricultural province. From the 1860s onwards, agricultural prices and land values soared in the Punjab. This stemmed from increasing political security and improvements in infrastructure and communications. New cash crops such as wheat, tobacco, sugar cane and cotton were introduced. By the 1920s the Punjab produced a tenth of India's total cotton crop and a third of its wheat crop. Per capita output of all the crops in the province increased by approximately 45 percent between 1891 and 1921, a growth contrasting to agricultural crises in Bengal, Bihar and Orissa during the period.

The Punjab Agricultural College and Research Institute became the first higher educational agricultural institution in the Punjab when established in 1906. Rapid agricultural growth, combined with access to easy credit for landowners, led to a growing crisis of indebtedness. When landowners were unable to pay down their loans, urban based moneylenders took advantage of the law to foreclose debts of mortgaged land. This led to a situation where land increasingly passed to absentee moneylenders who had little connection to the villages were the land was located. The colonial government recognised this as a potential threat to the stability of the province, and a split emerged in the government between paternalists who favoured intervention to ensure order, and those who opposed state intervention in private property relations. The paternalists emerged victorious and the Punjab Land Alienation Act, 1900 prevented urban commercial castes, who were overwhelmingly Hindu, from permanently acquiring land from statutory agriculturalist tribes, who were mainly Muslim and Sikh.

Accompanied by the increasing franchise of the rural population, this interventionist approach led to a long lasting impact on the political landscape of the province. The agricultural lobby remained loyal to the government, and rejected communalism in common defence of its privileges against urban moneylenders. This position was entrenched by the Unionist Party. The Congress Party's opposition to the Act led to it being marginalised in the Punjab, reducing its influence more so than in any other province, and inhibiting its ability to challenge colonial rule locally. The political dominance of the Unionist Party would remain until partition, and significantly it was only on the collapse of its power on the eve of independence from Britain, that communal violence began to spread in rural Punjab.

== Army ==
In the immediate aftermath of annexation, the Sikh Khalsa Army was disbanded, and soldiers were required to surrender their weapons and return to agricultural or other pursuits. The Bengal Army, keen to utilise the highly trained ex-Khalsa army troops began to recruit from the Punjab for Bengal infantry units stationed in the province. However opposition to the recruitment of these soldiers spread and resentment emerged from sepoys of the Bengal Army towards the incursion of Punjabis into their ranks. In 1851, the Punjab Irregular Force also known as the 'Piffars' was raised. Initially they consisted of one garrison and four mule batteries, four regiments of cavalry, eleven of infantry and the Corps of Guides, totalling approximately 13,000 men. The gunners and infantry were mostly Punjabi, many from the Khalsa Army, whilst the cavalry had a considerable Hindustani presence.

During the Indian Rebellion of 1857, eighteen new regiments were raised from the Punjab which remained loyal to the East India Company throughout the crisis in the Punjab and United Provinces. By June 1858, of the 80,000 native troops in the Bengal Army, 75,000 were Punjabi of which 23,000 were Sikh. In the aftermath of the rebellion, a thorough re-organisation of the army took place. Henceforth recruitment into the British Indian Army was restricted to loyal peoples and provinces. Punjabi Sikhs emerged as a particularly favoured martial race to serve the army. In the midst of The Great Game, and fearful of a Russian invasion of British India, the Punjab was regarded of significant strategic importance as a frontier province. In addition to their loyalty and a belief in their suitability to serve in harsh conditions, Punjabi recruits were favoured as they could be paid at the local service rate, whereas soldiers serving on the frontier from more distant lands had to be paid extra foreign service allowances. By 1875, of the entire Indian army, a third of recruits hailed from the Punjab.

In 1914, three fifths of the Indian army came from the Punjab, despite the region constituting approximately one tenth of the total population of British India. During the First World War, Punjabi Sikhs alone accounted for one quarter of all armed personnel in India. Military service provided access to the wider world, and personnel were deployed across the British Empire from Malaya, the Mediterranean and Africa. Upon completion of their terms of service, these personnel were often amongst the first to seek their fortunes abroad. At the outbreak of the Second World War, 48 percent of the Indian army came from the province. In Jhelum, Rawalpindi and Attock, the percentage of the total male population who enlisted reached fifteen percent. The Punjab continued to be the main supplier of troops throughout the war, contributing 36 percent of the total Indian troops who served in the conflict.

The huge proportion of Punjabis in the army meant that a significant amount of military expenditure went to Punjabis and in turn resulted in an abnormally high level of resource input in the Punjab. It has been suggested that by 1935 if remittances of serving officers were combined with income from military pensions, more than two thirds of Punjab's land revenue could have been paid out of military incomes. Military service further helped reduce the extent of indebtedness across the Province. In Hoshiarpur, a notable source of military personnel, in 1920 thirty percent of proprietors were debt free compared to the region's average of eleven percent. In addition, the benefits of military service and the perception that the government was benevolent towards soldiers, affected the latter's attitudes towards the British. The loyalty of recruited peasantry and the influence of military groups in rural areas across the province limited the reach of the nationalist movement in the province.

== Communications and transport ==
In 1853, the Viceroy Lord Dalhousie issued a minute stressing the military importance of railways across India. In the Punjab, however, it was initially strategic commercial interests which drove investment in railways and communications from 1860.

Independent railway companies emerged, such as the Scinde, Punjab and Delhi railways to build and operate new lines. In 1862, the first section of railway in the Punjab was constructed between Lahore and Amritsar, and Lahore Junction railway station opened. Lines were opened between Lahore and Multan in 1864, and Amritsar and Delhi in 1870. The Scinde, Punjab and Delhi railways merged to form the Scinde, Punjab & Delhi Railway in 1870, creating a link between Karachi and Lahore via Multan. The Punjab Northern State Railway linked Lahore and Peshawar in 1883. By 1886, the independent railways had amalgamated into North Western State Railway.

The construction of railway lines and the network of railway workshops generated employment opportunities, which in turn led to increased immigration into cantonment towns. As connectivity increased across the province, it facilitated the movement of goods, and increased human interaction. It has been observed that the Ferozpur, Lahore and Amritsar began to develop into one composite cultural triangle due to the ease of connectivity between them. Similarly barriers of spoken dialects eroded over time, and cultural affinities were increasingly fostered.

== Government ==
=== Early administration ===
In 1849, a Board of Administration was put in place to govern the newly annexed province. The Board was led by a President and two assistants. Beneath them Commissioners acted as Superintendents of revenue and police and exercised the civil appellate and the original criminal powers of Sessions Judges, whilst Deputy Commissioners were given subordinate civil, criminal and fiscal powers. In 1853, the Board of Administration was abolished, and authority was invested in a single Chief Commissioner. The Government of India Act 1858 led to further restructuring and the office of Lieutenant-Governor replaced that of Chief Commissioner. Although The Indian Councils Act, 1861 laid the foundation for the establishment of a local legislature in the Punjab, the first legislature was constituted in 1897. It consisted of a body of nominated officials and non-officials and was presided over by the Lieutenant-Governor. The first council lasted for eleven years until 1909. The Morley-Minto Reforms led to an elected members complementing the nominated officials in subsequent councils.

=== Punjab Legislative Council and Assembly ===
The Government of India Act 1919 introduced the system of dyarchy across British India and led to the implementation of the first Punjab Legislative Council in 1921. At the same time the office of lieutenant governor was replaced with that of governor. The initial Council had ninety three members, seventy per cent of which were elected and the rest nominated. A president was elected by the Council to preside over the meetings. Between 1921 and 1936, there were four terms of the Council.

Council	Inaugurated	Dissolved	President(s)
First Council	8 January 1921	27 October 1923	Sir Montagu Butler and Herbert Casson
Second Council	2 January 1924	27 October 1926	Herbert Casson, Sir Abdul Qadir and Sir Shahab-ud-Din Virk
Third Council	3 January 1927	26 July 1930	Sir Shahab-ud-Din Virk
Fourth Council	24 October 1930	10 November 1936	Sir Shahab-ud-Din Virk and Sir Chhotu Ram

In 1935, the Government of India Act 1935 replaced dyarchy with increased provincial autonomy. It introduced direct elections, and enabled elected Indian representatives to form governments in the provincial assemblies. The Punjab Legislative Council was replaced by a Punjab Legislative Assembly, and the role of President with that of a Speaker. Membership of the Assembly was fixed at 175 members, and it was intended to sit for five years.

=== First Assembly Election ===
The first election was held in 1937 and was won outright by the Unionist Party. Its leader, Sir Sikandar Hayat Khan was asked by the Governor, Sir Herbert Emerson to form a Ministry and he chose a cabinet consisting of three Muslims, two Hindus and a Sikh. Sir Sikandar died in 1942 and was succeeded as Premier by Khizar Hayat Khan Tiwana.

Position	Name
Premier	Sir Sikandar Hayat Khan
Revenue Minister	Sir Sundar Singh Majithia
Development Minister	Sir Chhotu Ram
Finance Minister	Manohar Lal
Public Works Minister	Khizar Hayat Khan Tiwana
Education Minister	Mian Abdul Haye

=== Second Assembly Election ===
The next election was held in 1946. The Muslim League won the most seats, winning 73 out of a total of 175. However a coalition led by the Unionist Party and consisting of the Congress Party and Akali Party were able to secure an overall majority. A campaign of civil disobedience by the Muslim League followed, lasting six weeks, and led to the resignation of Sir Khizar Tiwana and the collapse of the coalition government on 2 March 1947. The Muslim League however were unable to attract the support of other minorities to form a coalition government themselves. Amid this stalemate the Governor Sir Evan Jenkins assumed control of the government and remained in charge until the independence of India and Pakistan.

== Coat of arms ==
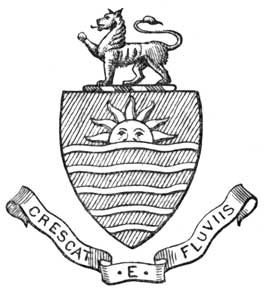
Arms of British Punjab

Crescat e Fluviis meaning, Let it grow from the rivers was the Latin motto used in the coat of arms for Punjab Province. As per the book History of the Sikhs written by Khushwant Singh, it means Strength from the Rivers.

== Administrative timeline ==
- 1849–1853: Punjab administered by a board of administration
- 1853–1859: Punjab administered by a chief-commissioner
- 1859–1919: Punjab administered by a lieutenant-governor
- 1919–1947: Punjab administered by a governor

== See also ==
- Category:People from Punjab Province (British India)
- History of Punjab
- Punjab States Agency
- Misl § List of misls
