= Districts of British India =

Administrative units of British India

The districts of British India were key administrative units of the British Raj, or Indian Empire, serving as subdivisions of the provinces and divisions of British India. These districts, often referred to as zillas in vernacular languages, played a crucial role in the governance and administration of British India, managing local affairs such as revenue collection, law enforcement, and public works. Most districts established during the British period became the foundation for modern districts of India and districts of Pakistan after the partition of India in 1947.

== History ==
The district system in British India evolved from earlier administrative structures under the Mughal Empire, where regions were divided into sarkars and parganas. The British East India Company, after gaining control over Bengal in the mid-18th century, began formalizing districts as administrative units to streamline governance and revenue collection. By the early 19th century, districts were firmly established across British India, each headed by a district collector or magistrate responsible for local administration.

Districts were further grouped into divisions, which were overseen by commissioners, and these divisions were part of larger provinces. This hierarchical structure allowed the British to maintain control over vast territories with diverse populations. The districts' boundaries and administrative functions evolved over time, reflecting changes in British policies and local needs.

Following the Indian Rebellion of 1857, the British Crown assumed direct control over India, and the district system was further standardized. By the early 20th century, districts were the primary units for local governance, with responsibilities including judicial administration, public health, education, and infrastructure development.

At the time of the partition of India in 1947, most districts were reorganized into the newly independent nations of India and Pakistan, with some districts split along religious lines. Today, the legacy of these districts continues in the administrative frameworks of both countries.

== List of districts in British Toritary ==
Below is a list of districts in British India as of 1947, organized by province and division. This list includes only those districts that were active at the time of the partition of India.

=== Districts in the Assam province ===
==== Assam Valley division ====
- Balipara Frontier District
- Darrang district
- Garo Hills district
- Goalpara district
- Kamrup district
- Lakhimpur district
- Nowgong district
- Sadiya Frontier District
- Sibsagar district

==== Surma Valley and Hills division ====
- Cachar district
- Khasi and Jaintia Hills district
- Lushai Hills district
- Naga Hills district (excluding Naga tribal areas)
- Sylhet district

=== Districts in the Baluchistan Province ===
- Bolan district
- Chagai district
- Loralai district
- Quetta-Pishin district
- Sibi District (excluding Marri-Bugti County)
- Zhob district

=== Districts in the Bengal Presidency ===
The Bengal Presidency had 28 districts across five divisions at the time of partition.

==== Burdwan division (Chuchura) ====
- Bankura district
- Birbhum district
- Bardhaman district
- Howrah district
- Hooghly district
- Midnapore district

==== Chittagong Division ====
- Chittagong district
- Chittagong Hills district
- Noakhali district
- Tipperah district

==== Dacca division ====
- Bakerganj district
- Dacca district
- Faridpur district
- Mymensingh district

==== Presidency division (Calcutta) ====
- Calcutta district
- Jessore district
- Khulna district
- Murshidabad district
- Nadia district (After partition, 52% of the land remained with India and 48% with East Bengal as Kushtia District)
- 24 Paraganas district

==== Rajshahi Division (Jalpaiguri) ====
- Bogra district
- Dinajpur district
- Darjeeling district
- Jalpaiguri district
- Malda district
- Rajshahi district
- Rangpur district
- Pabna district

=== Districts in the Bihar Province ===
==== Bhagalpur Division ====
- Bhagalpur district
- Munger district
- Purnia district
- Santhal Pargana district

==== Chota Nagpur division (Ranchi) ====
- Hazaribagh district
- Manbhum district
- Palamau district
- Ranchi district
- Singhbhum district

==== Patna division ====
- Gaya district
- Patna district
- Shahabad district

==== Tirhut division (Muzaffarpur) ====
- Champaran district
- Darbhanga district
- Muzaffarpur district
- Saran district

=== Districts in the Bombay Presidency ===
- Ahmedabad district
- Ahmednagar district
- Belgaum district
- Bharuch district
- Bijapur district
- Bombay City district
- Bombay Suburban district
- Colaba district
- Dharwar district
- East Khandesh district
- Kaira district
- Nasik district
- North Kanara district
- Panchmahal district
- Poona district
- Ratnagiri district
- Satara district
- Sholapur district
- Surat district
- Thana district
- West Khandesh district

=== Districts in the Burma province (till 1936) ===
==== Arakan Division ====
- Akyab
- Arakan Hill
- Kyaukpyu
- Sandoway

==== Magwe Division ====
- Chin Hill
- Magway
- Minbu
- Pakokku
- Thayetmyo

==== Mandalay Division ====
- Kyaukse
- Mandalay
- Meiktila
- Myingyan

==== Tenasserim Division ====
- Toungoo
- Thaton
- Amherst
- Salween
- Tavoy
- Mergui

==== Pegu Division ====
- Insein
- Hanthawaddy
- Pegu
- Tharrawaddy
- Prome District

==== Irrawaddy Division ====
- Bassein
- Henzada
- Maubin
- Myaungmya
- Pyapon

==== Sagaing Division ====
- Bhamo
- Lower Chindwin
- Upper Chindwin
- Katha
- Myitkyina
- Sagaing
- Hukawng Valley
- The Triangle Native areas

=== Districts in the Central Provinces and Berar ===
==== Berar Division (Amravati) ====
- Akola district
- Amravati district
- Buldhana district
- Yavatmal district

==== Chhattisgarh division (Raipur) ====
- Balaghat district
- Bhandara district
- Bilaspur district
- Durg district
- Raipur district

==== Jubbulpore division ====
- Hoshangabad district
- Jubbulpore district
- Mandla district
- Nimar district
- Saugor district

==== Nagpur division ====
- Betul district
- Chanda district
- Chhindwara district
- Nagpur district
- Wardha district

=== Districts in the Madras Presidency ===
- Anantapur district
- Bellary district
- Chingleput district
- Chittoor district
- Coimbatore district
- Cuddapah district
- East Godavari district
- Guntur district
- Krishna district
- Kurnool district
- Madura district
- Malabar district
- Nellore district
- North Arcot District
- Ramnad district
- Salem district
- South Arcot district
- South Canara district
- Tanjore district
- Tinnevely district
- Trichinopoly district
- Vizagapatam district
- West Godavari district

=== Districts of North-West Frontier province ===
- Bannu district
- Dera Ismail Khan district
- Hazara district
- Kohat district
- Mardan district
- Peshawar district

=== Districts of Orissa province ===
- Balasore district
- Cuttack district
- Ganjam district
- Koraput district
- Puri district
- Sambalpur district

=== Districts of Punjab province ===
==== Ambala division ====
- Ambala district
- Gurgaon district
- Hissar district
- Karnal district
- Rohtak district
- Simla district

==== Jullundur division ====
- Ferozpore district
- Hoshiarpur district
- Jullundur district
- Kangra district
- Ludhiana district

==== Lahore division ====
- Amritsar district
- Gujranwala district
- Gurdaspur district
- Lahore district
- Shekhupura district
- Sialkot district

==== Multan division ====
- Dera Ghazi Khan district
- Jhang district
- Lyallpur district
- Montgomery district
- Multan district
- Muzaffargarh district

==== Rawalpindi division ====
- Attock district
- Gujrat district
- Jhelum district
- Mianwali district
- Rawalpindi district
- Shahpur district

=== Districts of Sind province ===
- Dadu district
- Hyderabad district
- Karachi district
- Larkana district
- Nawabshah district
- Sukkur district
- Thar Parkar district
- Upper Sindh Frontier district

=== Districts of United Provinces ===
==== Agra division ====
- Agra district
- Aligarh district
- Etah district
- Mainpuri district
- Muttra district

==== Allahabad division ====
- Allahabad district
- Cawnpore district
- Etawah district
- Fatehpur district
- Farrukhabad district

==== Benares division ====
- Ballia district
- Benares district
- Gazipur district
- Jaunpur district
- Mirzapur district

==== Faizabad division ====
- Bahraich district
- Bara Banki district
- Faizabad district
- Gonda district
- Pratapgarh district
- Sultanpur district

==== Gorakhpur division ====
- Azamgarh district
- Basti district
- Deoria district
- Gorakhpur district

==== Jhansi division ====
- Banda district
- Hamirpur district
- Jalaun district
- Jhansi district

==== Kumaon division (Nainital) ====
- Almora district
- Garhwal district
- Nainital district

==== Lucknow division ====
- Hardoi district
- Kheri district
- Lucknow district
- Rae Bareli district
- Sitapur district
- Unao district

==== Meerut division ====
- Bulandshahr district
- Dehra Dun district
- Meerut district
- Muzaffarnagar district
- Saharanpur district

==== Rohilkhand division (Bareilly) ====
- Bareilly district
- Bijnor district
- Budaun district
- Moradabad district
- Pilibhit district
- Shahjahanpur district

=== Other districts ===
- Ajmer district (the only district of Ajmer-Merwara Province)
- Delhi district(the only district of Delhi Province)
- Coorg district (the only district of Coorg Province)

== List of districts in Princely state ==
=== Districts in the Gwalior State ===
==== Gwalior Division ====
- Bhilsa District
- Bhind District
- Gwalior Gird District
- Isagarh District (renamed Guna District)
- Narwar District (renamed Shivpuri District)
- Sheopur District
- Tanwarghar District (renamed Morena District)

==== Malwa Division ====
- Amjhera District (renamed Sardarpur District)
- Mandsaur District
- Shajapur District
- Ujjain District

=== Districts in the Hyderabad State ===
==== Aurangabad division ====
- Aurangabad district
- Bir district
- Nander district
- Parabhani district

==== Gulbarga division ====
- Bidar district
- Gulbarga district
- Osmanabad district
- Raichur district

==== Gulshanabad division (Medak) ====
- Atraf-i-Baldah district
- Mahbubnagar district
- Medak district
- Nalgonda district
- Nizamabad district

==== Warangal division ====
- Adilabad district
- Karimnagar district
- Warangal district

=== Districts in the Jammu and Kashmir State ===
==== Jammu division ====
===== Districts =====
- Jammu district
- Kathua district
- Mirpur district
- Reasi district
- Udhampur district

Jagirs

- Chenani
- Poonch

==== Kashmir Division ====
- Anantnag district
- Baramula district
- Muzaffarabad district

==== Frontier Division ====
- Astore district
- Gilgit district (excluding Gilgit Agency)
- Ladakh district

=== Districts in the Indore State ===
==== Malwa division ====
- Indore district
- Mahidpur district
- Ramapura-Bhanapura district

==== Nimar Division ====
- Nemwar district
- Nimar District

=== Districts in the Mysore State ===
- Bangalore district
- Chitaldrug district
- Hassan district
- Kadur district
- Kolar district
- Mandya district
- Mysore district
- Shimoga district
- Tumkur district

== Former districts of British Toritary ==
The following districts were active at various points during British rule but were dissolved or reorganized before 1947:

- Chanderi district
- Ellichpur district
- Jungle Mahals
- Jungle Terry
- Khandesh district
- Merwara district
- Muhamdi district
- Neemuch district
- North Bareilly district
- Sironj district
- Thal-Chotiali
- Wun district

== See also ==
- List of districts in India
- Subdivisions of British India
- Territorial evolution of the British Empire
