= Subdivisions of British India =

Overview of the administrative divisions of British India

For administrative purposes, British India was divided into the following administrative divisions:

== Main administrative divisions ==
- Provinces of British India
- Presidencies of British India
- Divisions of British India
- Districts of British India

== Political units ==
While British India did administratively not include the princely states, which remained nominally outside the British Raj, under the administration of their own rulers, the relationship of the British with these states was managed by:

- Agencies of British India
- Residencies of British India

Still, the British authorities recurred to the doctrine of lapse when they decided to interfere in the internal matters of a princely state.

== See also ==
- Territorial evolution of the British Empire
