= Divisions of British India =

Administrative divisions of the Government of the British Raj or the Indian Empire

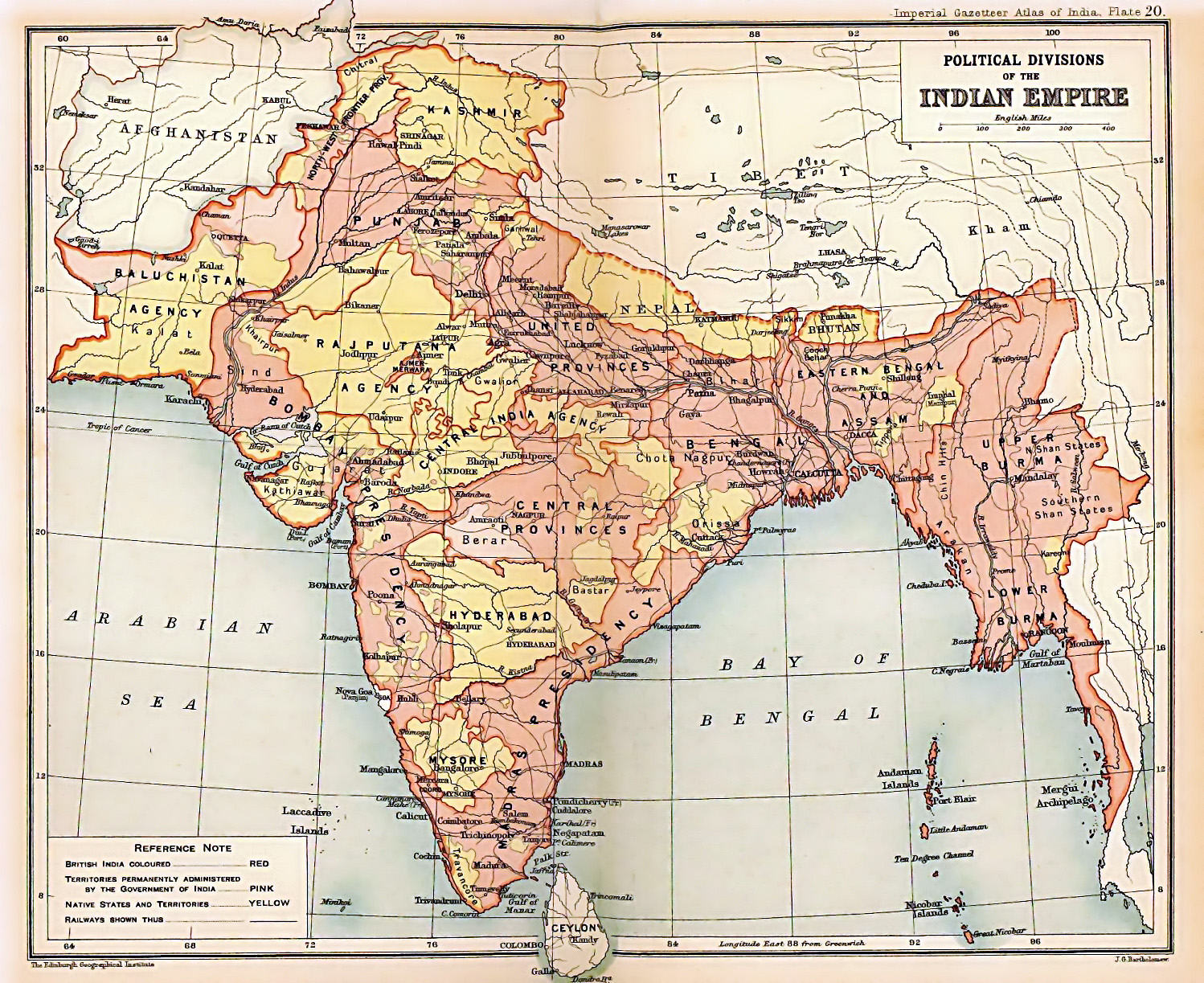
1909 British Indian Empire map as appeared in The Imperial Gazetteer of India

The divisions of British India were the administrative divisions of the Government of the British Raj or the Indian Empire.

== Divisions in Bengal ==
The seven Bengal Regulation Districts were named as 'divisions' in 1851:

- Jessore Division, area 14,853 sq mi, population 5,345,472 (1851)
- Bhagalpur Division area 26,464 sq mi, population 8,431,000
- Cuttack Division, area 12,664 sq mi, population 2,793,883
- British division (Moorshedabad), area 17,556 sq mi, population 6,815,876
- Dacca Division, area 20,942 sq mi, population 4,055,800
- Patna Division, area 13,803 sq mi, population 7,000,000
- Chittagong Division, area 7,410 sq mi, population 2,406,950

The partition of Bengal in 1905, there were seven divisions in Bengal :

- Presidency Division
- Burdwan Division
- Patna Division
- Bhagalpur Division
- Tirhut Division
- Chota Nagpur Division
- Orissa Division (Cuttack)

After the reunification of Bengal in 1911, the boundaries of Bengal were changed and the Bengal were divided five divisions . viz :

- Presidency Division
- Dacca Division
- Chittagong Division
- Rajshahi Division
- Burdwan Division

=== Divisions of Eastern Bengal and Assam ===
The divisions of Eastern Bengal and Assam Province 1905—1912:

- Dacca Division
- Chittagong Division
- Rajshahi Division
- Assam Valley Division
- Surma Valley and Hill Districts Division

== Divisions in Baroda ==
- Kadi Division
- Baroda Division
- Amreli Division
- Navsari Division

== Divisions in Bombay ==
- Northern Division
- Southern Division
- Central Division
- Sind Division until 1936

== Divisions in Burma ==
- Arakan Division
- Pegu Division
- Irrawaddy Division
- Tenasserim Division
- Mimbu Division
- Mandalay Division
- Sagaing Division
- Meiktila Division

== Divisions in Central India ==
- Gwalior Residency
- Bundelkhand Agency
- Baghelkhand Agency
- Malwa Agency
- Bhopal Agency
- Indore Residency
- Bhopawar Agency

== Divisions in Central Provinces and Berar ==
- Nagpur Division
- Jubbulpore Division
- Chhattisgarh Division
- Nerbudda Division
- Berar Division

== Divisions of Hyderabad ==
- Aurangabad Division
- Gulbarga Division
- Gushanabad Division (Medak Division)
- Warangal Division

== Divisions in Rajputana ==
- Western Rajputana States Residency
- Haraoti and Tonk Agency
- Mewar Residency
- Eastern Rajputana States Agency
- Kotah and Jhalawar Agency

== Divisions in United Provinces ==
- Meerut Division
- Agra Division
- Bareilly Division
- Allahabad Division
- Benares Division
- Gorakhpur Division
- Kumaun Division
- Jhansi Division
- Lucknow Division formerly also Sitapur Division
- Faizabad Division (Fyzabad Division)

== Divisions in Punjab ==
- Lahore Division
- Rawalpindi Division
- Multan Division
- Ambala Division and Delhi Division until 1921
- Jalandhar Division

== See also ==
- Medak Gulshanabad Division
- Presidencies and provinces of British India
- Subdivisions of British India
- Territorial evolution of the British Empire
