= Sind Division =

Former administrative division of British India

Coordinates: 26.10°N 68.56°E

- Division of British India
- 1843–1936
- Flag

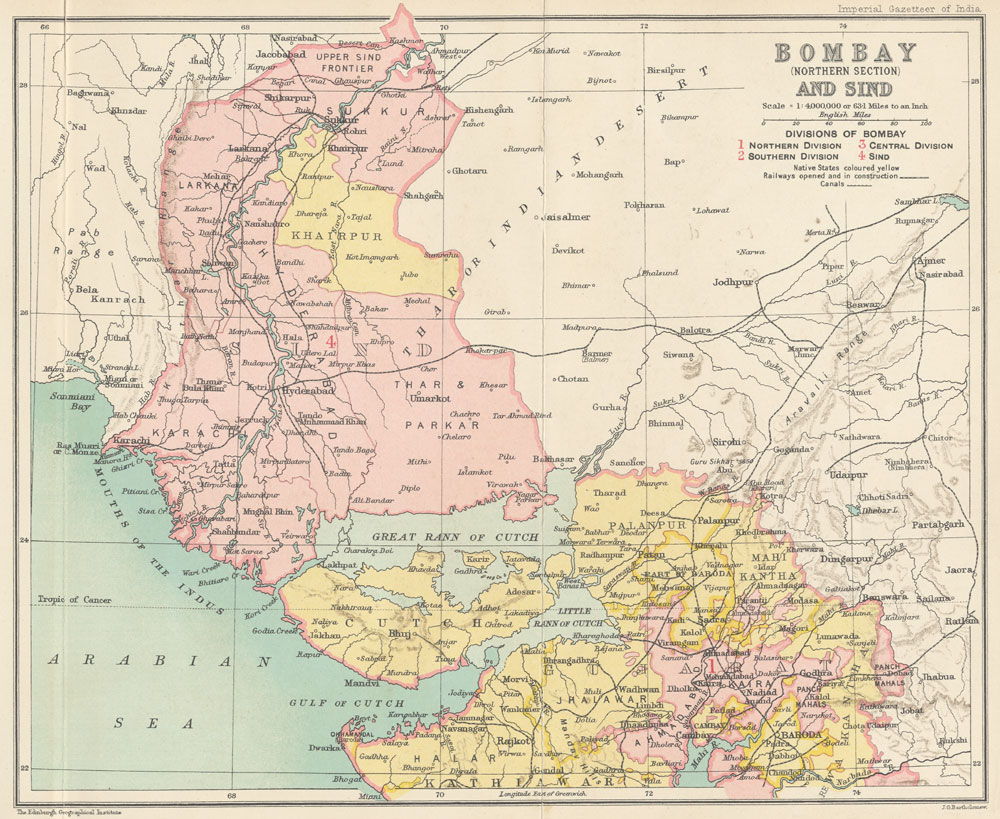
- 1909 map showing the northern Bombay Presidency and Sind
- History
  - Defeat of the local rulers at the Battle of Miani and the Battle of Hyderabad: 1843
  - Creation of Sind Province: 1936
Preceded by	Succeeded by
Sind State	Sind Province

The Sind Division was an administrative division of British India attached to Bombay Presidency, in modern day it is Sindh province.

== History ==
The territory was annexed by the Bombay Presidency of British India on 17 February 1843, following a British Indian conquest led by then Major-General Charles Napier in order to quell the insurrection of Sindhi rulers who had remained hostile to the British Empire following the First Anglo-Afghan War. Napier's campaign against these chieftains resulted in the victories of the Battle of Miani and the Battle of Hyderabad.

The Sind Division was separated from the Bombay Presidency on 1 April 1936 and the region became the Sind Province.

== Administration ==
=== 1839–1936 ===
In 1839, British Invaded the Sind.

On 1843's annexation Sind was merged into Bombay Presidency and form a division of Bombay Presidency.

Districts and Divisions were both introduced in Sind as administrative units by the British when Sind became a part of British India, and ever since then, they have formed an integral part in the civil administration of the Sind. At the time in 1843, the Sind was divided into 3 districts, under 1 division (Khairpur state can't included);

The administration given below:

- Sind Division
  - Hyderabad District
  - Karachi District
  - Shikarpur District

In 1846–47 Upper Sind Frontier district headquarter was Khangarh (Jacobabad) carved out of Shikarpur district.

The administration given below:

- Sind Division
  - Hyderabad District
  - Karachi District
  - Shikarpur District
  - Upper Sind Frontier District

In 1882, British government create a new district named Thar and Parkar by bifurcation of Hyderabad district and In 1883, Headquarter of Shikarpur district was shifted from Shikarpur to Sukkur.

The administration given below:

- Sind Division
  - Hyderabad District
  - Karachi District
  - Shikarpur District
  - Upper Sind Frontier District
  - Thar and Parkar District

On 1 August 1901, British government split Shikarpur and Karachi district to create Larkana district and district status of Shikarpur also shifted to Sukkur.

The administration given below:

- Sind Division
  - Hyderabad District
  - Karachi District
  - Sukkur District (Formally Shikarpur)
  - Upper Sind Frontier District
  - Thar and Parkar District
  - Larkana District

On 1 November 1912, Hyderabad district again split to create Nawabshah district.

The administration given below:

- Sind Division
  - Hyderabad District
  - Karachi District
  - Sukkur District (Formally Shikarpur)
  - Upper Sind Frontier District
  - Thar and Parkar District
  - Larkana District
  - Nawabshah District

In 1931, British government divided Karachi and Larkana district to create Dadu district.

The administration given below:

- Sind Division
  - Hyderabad District
  - Karachi District
  - Sukkur District (Formally Shikarpur)
  - Upper Sind Frontier District
  - Thar and Parkar District
  - Larkana District
  - Nawabshah District
  - Dadu District

On April 1, 1936, Sind was separated from Bombay Presidency to form a separate province of British India.

== See also ==
- History of Sindh
- Peccavi
